= Philip II's Illyrian Campaigns =

358–337 BCE military campaigns

- Part of The Expansion of Macedonia under Philip II
- The Kingdom of Macedon in 336 BC, 1 year after the final Illyrian Campaign of Philip
Date	358 BC-337 BC
Location	Illyria
Result	Mostly Macedonian victory
Territorial changes	Upper Macedonia retaken from the Illyrians, The Dassaretii brought under Macedonian control and Taulantii reduced to only the lands along the Adriatic

Belligerents
Illyrian kingdom Grabaei; Taulantii; Autariatae; Kingdom of Dardania: Neighbouring Tribes	Kingdom of Macedon

Commanders and leaders
Bardylis †; Grabos II; Pleuratus I Cleitus of Dardania; Caeria †; Pleurias	Philip II of Macedon (WIA); Parmenion; Hippostratus †; Pausanias †; Cynane

Units involved
At least 6 Illyrian armies	Ancient Macedonian army Companion cavalry Somatophylakes

Strength
Under Bardylis: 10,000 infantry 500 cavalry	Against Bardylis: 10,000 infantry 600 cavalry Against Pleuratus I: Unknown but described as large

Casualties and losses
10,000 Illyrians displaced. Under Bardylis: 2,000-7,000; Under Caeria: heavy	At least: 300-500 Killed; 150 wounded 150 hetairoi Killed

Illyrian Campaigns were several military actions from 358 BC to 337 BC led by Philip II of Macedon against multiple Illyrian tribes and kingdoms.

== Background ==
=== Macedonian campaigns ===
In 393 BC Bardylis opposed the agreement of Amyntas III and Sirras and invaded Macedonia. Bardylis won a decisive battle against Amyntas III and forced him to leave, installing a puppet king in his place. The next year Amyntas III allied himself with the Thessalians and was able to bring Macedonia back under his rule and in 372 BC forced Macedonia to pay him tribute.

In 369 BC Bardylis stopped Alexander II of Macedon from exiling the Illyrians from Macedon.

In 359 BC the Paeonians began a series of raids against Macedonia in support of an Illyrian invasion Perdiccas III humiliated by having to pay tribute marched north with an army. The battle, known as the Battle of Upper Macedon (360 BC) resulted in 4,000 Macedonians, including the king, dying in battle.

== Battle of Erigon Valley ==
When Philip became king, Upper Macedonia was still under Illyrian control. To focus on consolidating his rule at home, Philip chose to uphold the treaty Illyrians had earlier forced upon Macedonia. He further strengthened his relationship with Macedonia by marrying Audata, the great-granddaughter of Bardylis thus preventing a major Illyrian invasion at a time when Macedonia was weak.

Soon Philip mobilized an army and went to fight the Illyrians. The two armies met on a plain in Erigon Valley. The two armies were almost equal in size, Bardylis having 10,000 infantry and 500 cavalry, while Philip had 10,000 infantry and 600 cavalry. The battle ended in a Macedonian victory, with Bardylis himself dying. Diodorus claims that the Illyrians suffered 7,000 casualties but that is considered an exaggeration. After the battle, the Illyrians sought peace, and Macedon took back Upper Macedonia and land as far as Lake Ohrid.

== Campaign against The Grabaei ==
After Bardylis' defeat and death, the Grabaei under Grabos II became the strongest Illyrian tribe. In 356 BC, the Athenians allied with the kings of Illyria, Paionia, and Thrace to try to block Philip's advance. In 356 BC an army under Parmenion defeated the Grabei under Grabos II. After the defeat Grabos II became a subject ally of Macedon.

== Campaign against the Taulantii ==
In 345 BC, Philip went on a campaign against the Taulantii. He invaded Taulantii with a large force, capturing many towns and cities. But Pleuratus I managed to defeat Philip in battle, wounding him in his right leg. Philip's advance into Taulantii stopped when he came to peace terms with Pleuratus I. After the campaign, the Taulantii were expelled from the border with Dassaretii and remained independent on the Adriatic coast.

== Campaign against the Dardani ==
Between 346 and the end of 343 BC Philip II of Macedon campaigned against the Kingdom of Dardania and other neighboring tribes under Cleitus of Dardania.Philip II of Macedon defeated the Dardanians taking prisoners and turning the Kingdom of Dardania into a vassal of Macedon.

== Battle against Caeria ==
In 344 or 343 BC Cynane accompanied her father Philip II of Macedon in battle against the Illyrian Queen Caeria. Cynane killed Caeria in a duel by blow to her throat she also defeated her army with great slaughter.

== Battle against the Autariatae ==
In 337 BC Philip wanted to subdue the Autariatae During his balkan campaigns he fought the Autariatae under King Pleurias and he almost succeeded on killing Philip . The Illyrians were victorious in the battle.

== Philip's Illyrian Vassals ==
After the campaigns Cleitus, Bardylis son and his kingdom, the Dardani, became vassals of Macedon. The Grabaei, Ardiaei and Autariatae are also sometimes considered Macedonian vassals, but the evidence of that is weak.

== Aftermath ==
In 335 BC the Taulantii under Glaucias of Taulantii the Dassaretii and Dardani under Cleitus and the Autariatae under Pleurias made an alliance against Macedon.

Alexander's ally, the Agrianes Under Langarus promised to deal with the Autariatae while Alexander went to deal with Cleitus. Langarus soon invaded the Autariatae and defeated them. Alexander had now reached Pelium with 23,000 men and found it under Cleitus control without Glaucias having arrived yet. Alexander attempted to siege Pelium before Glaucias arrived, but he was stopped by the reinforcements of Glaucias. After that, Alexander retreated for 3 days before coming back at night. Upon Alexander's arrival, he found the camp being defended without support from the outside. Cleitus and his soldiers burned down the camp before fleeing to Glaucias's realm.

Illyrian revolt of 335 BC
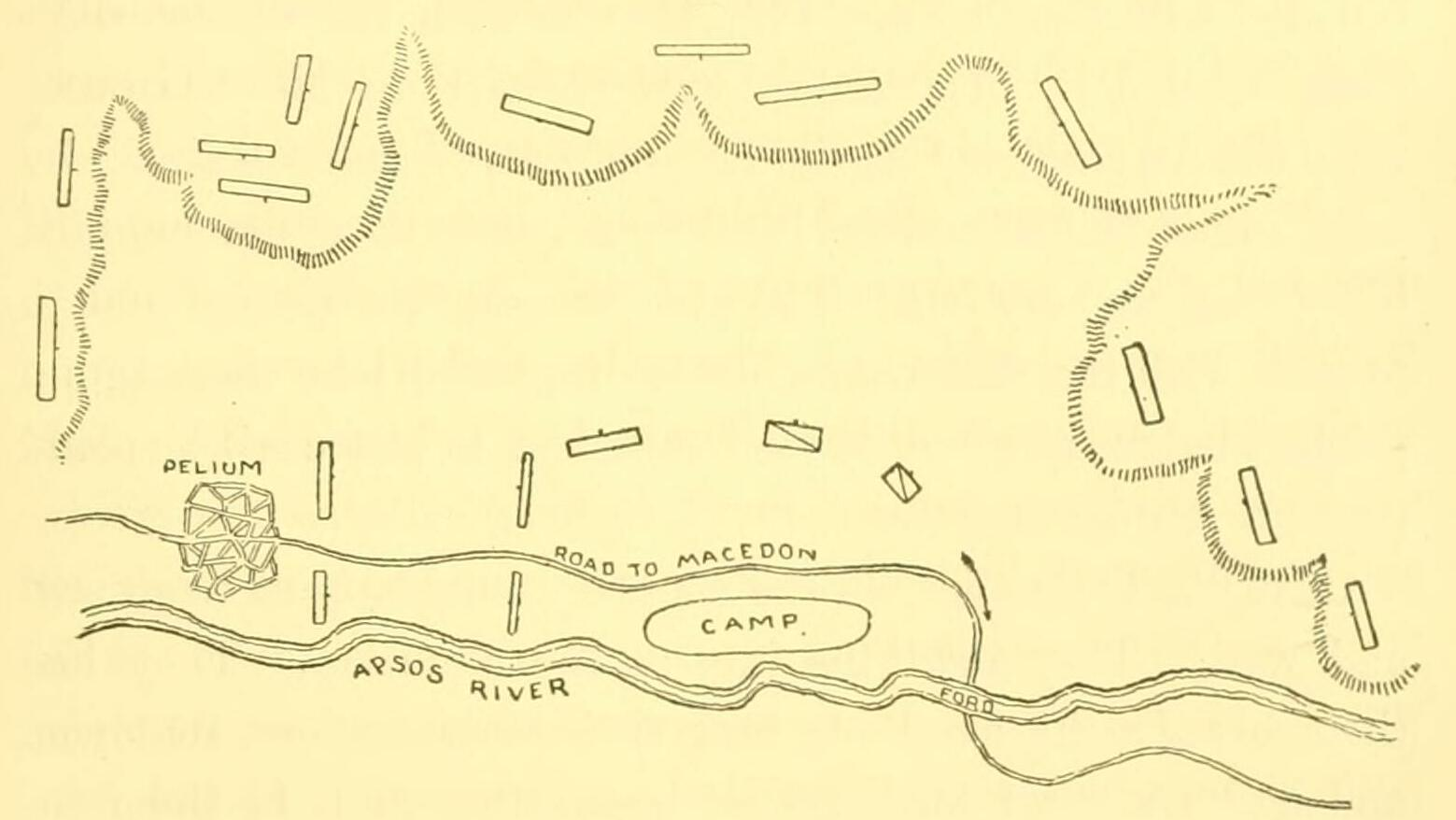
- The Plains of Pelium
Date	335 BC
Location	Illyria
Result	Macedonian-Agrianes victory

Belligerents
Dassaretii; Dardani; Taulantii; Autariatae	Kingdom of Macedon; Agrianes

Commanders and leaders
Glaucias of Taulantii; Cleitus (son of Bardylis); Pleurias	Alexander the Great; Langarus; Philotas

Strength
Unknown	23,000 (only Alexander's forces)

Casualties and losses
Heavy	Unknown
