= Grabaei =

Illyrian people

The Grabaei (also Kambaioi; Greek: Καμβαῖοι) were a minor Illyrian tribe who lived near Lake Skadar. (Note: Pliny the Elder (23–79 AD) mentioned them as one of the tribes that inhabited the area around Lake Skadar (within a region encompassing Rhizinium, Acruvium, Butua, Olcinium, and the river Drin upon Shkodër). Wilkes (1992) placed them near Lake Skadar. Hammond (1994) placed them in the Skodra region. Hubert Zehnacker placed them around the Drin. Johann Hahn (1840) placed them between Drin and Acroceraunia.) They were mentioned by Pliny the Elder (23–79 AD).

== History ==
After Philip II of Macedon defeated Bardylis (358 BC), the Grabaei, under Grabos II, became the most powerful tribe in Illyria. 7,000 Illyrians were killed by Philip II's army in a great victory, annexing the territory up to Lake Ohrid. He then reduced the Grabaei, targeted another Illyrian king called Pleuratus (considered by some modern scholars an Ardiaean or Taulantian chieftain), defeated the Triballi (339 BC), and fought with Pleurias, king of the Autariatai (337 BC).

After 9 AD, the remnants of Illyrian tribes moved to new coastal cities and larger and more capable civitates; the Grabaei (called Kambaioi) were among these, mentioned by Pliny the Elder.

Kretschmer etymologically connected their name to Slavic grabǔ, "hornbeam", with a cognate in Epirote Greek gábros (γάβρος, "oak-wood"). Their name has been connected to Umbrian Krapuvi and Grabovie, gods of Iguvium. Gabraeum (Gabraion), a place in Epirus, may be connected to the tribe. The name of Illyrian king Grabos II suggests a connection with the tribe.

== See also ==
- List of ancient Illyrian peoples and tribes

== Bibliography ==
- Hahn, Johann Georg von (1854). Albanesische Studien: Nebst einer Karte und andern artistischen Beilagen. F. Mauke. p. 240.
- Hammond, N. G. L (1993). Studies concerning Epirus and Macedonia before Alexander. Hakkert. ISBN 9789025610500.
- Hammond, N. G. L. (1994). "Illyrians and North-west Greeks". The Cambridge Ancient History Volume 6: The Fourth Century BC. Cambridge University Press: 422–443. doi:10.1017/CHOL9780521233484.017. ISBN 9781139054331.
- Wilkes, J. J. (1969). Dalmatia. Harvard University Press. ISBN 9780674189508.
- Wilkes, J. J. (1992). The Illyrians. Blackwell. p. 121. ISBN 06-3119-807-5.
