= Beroea of Taulantii =

Molossian princess married to Glaukias

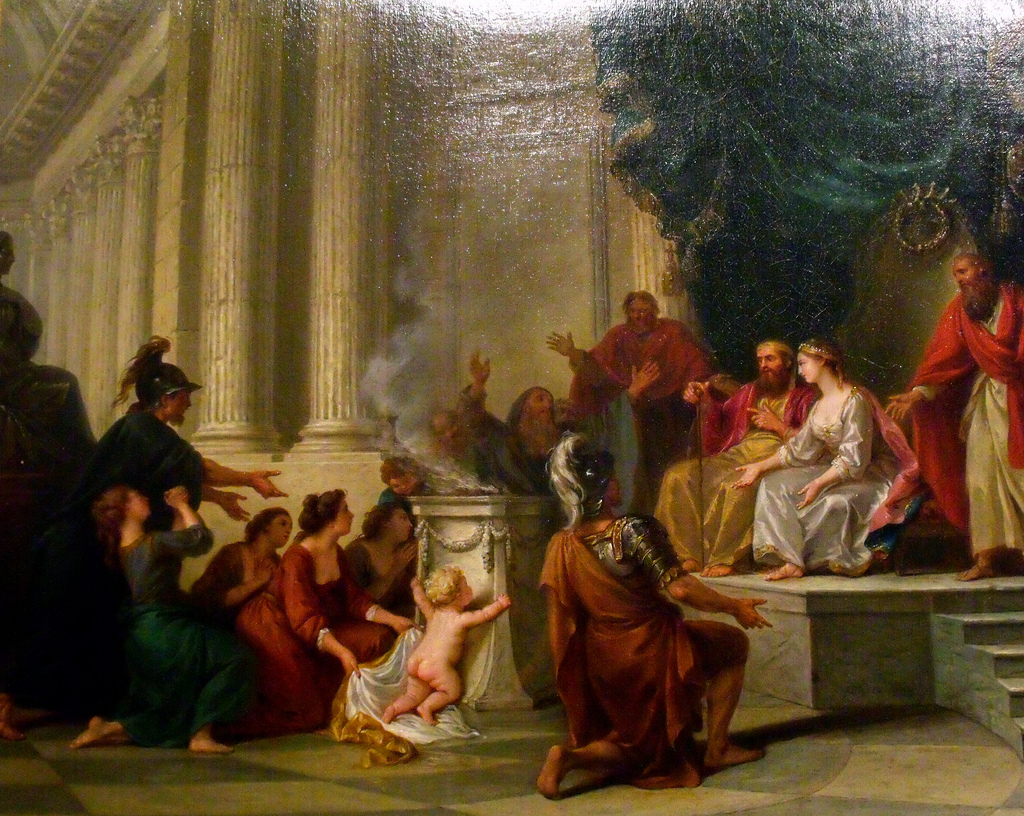
- Young Pyrrhus being presented to King Glaukias and Queen Beroea
- Spouse: Glaucias of Taulantii
- Dynasty: Aeacidae

Beroea (Ancient Greek: Βέροια) was a Molossian princess who became an Illyrian queen as wife of Glaukias, king of the Taulantii. She came from the ruling Molossian Aeacidae dynasty of Epirus. She raised Pyrrhus of Epirus when he was adopted by Glaukias.

== Marriage ==
According to Waldemar Heckel, the marriage between Beroea of the Aeacidae dynasty of Molossians, and Glaukias of the Taulantian tribe of Illyrians, probably points to long-standing barbarian connections of the two regions of Illyria and Epirus. Those connections can also be seen in the time of Pyrrhus of Epirus, who was adopted by Glaukias and Beroea, and who took as wives two Illyrians (including Bircenna, daughter of Bardylis II), of whom he was extraordinarily fond.

== Bibliography ==
- Greenwalt, William S. (2011). "Macedonia, Illyria and Epirus". In Roisman, Joseph; Worthington, Ian (eds.). A Companion to Ancient Macedonia. John Wiley & Sons. pp. 279–305. ISBN 978-1-4443-5163-7.
- Heckel, Waldemar (2020). In the Path of Conquest Resistance to Alexander the Great. Oxford University Press. ISBN 9780190076702.
