= Balkan campaign of Alexander the Great =

Alexander the Great's first military campaign as king of Macedon

Alexander's Balkan campaign
- Part of the Wars of Alexander the Great
- The Kingdom of Macedonia in 336 BC
Date	335 BC
Location	Ancient Greece, Illyria, Thrace, Dacia
Result	Macedonian victory

Belligerents
Macedonia; Agrianes	Thracians; Triballi; Illyrians; Getai; Thebes

Commanders and leaders
Alexander the Great; Langaros	Kleitos; Glaukias; Syrmos

Strength
12,000 heavy infantry 8,000 light infantry 3,000 cavalry Versus the Getae: 4,000 infantry, 1,500 cavalry	14,000 men (Getae)

The Balkan campaign of Alexander the Great took place in 335 BC, against a number of rebellious vassals of the Macedonian kingdom. Alexander successfully pacified each in turn, leaving him free to begin the long-planned invasion of Persia.

In 336 BC, while attending the wedding of his daughter by Olympias, Cleopatra and Olympias' brother, Alexander I of Epirus at Aegae, Philip II was assassinated by the captain of his bodyguard, Pausanias. Philip's son, and previously designated heir, Alexander was proclaimed king by the Macedonian noblemen and army.

News of Philip's death roused many states into revolt including Thebes, Athens, Thessaly and the Thracian tribes to the north of Macedon. When news of the revolt reached Alexander he responded quickly. Though his advisors advised him to use diplomacy, Alexander mustered the Macedonian cavalry of 3,000 men and rode south towards Thessaly, Macedon's immediate neighbor to the south. Finding the Thessalian army occupying the pass between Mount Olympus and Mount Ossa, he had the men ride through Mount Ossa and position themselves at the rear of the enemy encampment. Upon discovering this maneuver, the Thessalians surrendered, adding their cavalry to Alexander's force as he rode down towards the Peloponnese.

Alexander stopped at Thermopylae, where he was recognised as the leader of the Sacred League before heading south to Corinth. Athens sued for peace and Alexander received the envoy and pardoned anyone involved with the uprising. At Corinth, he was given the title 'Hegemon' of the Greek forces against the Persians. While at Corinth, he heard the news of the Thracian rising to the north.

== Thrace ==
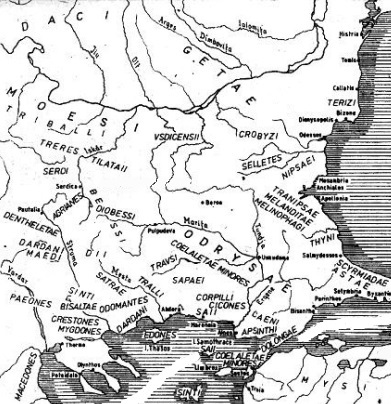
Thracian tribes

Before crossing to Asia, Alexander wanted to safeguard his northern borders and, in the spring of 335 BC, he advanced into Thrace to deal with the revolt, which was led by the Illyrians and Triballi. He was reinforced along the way by the Agriani, a Thracian/Paeonian tribe under the command of Alexander's friend, Langarus. The Macedonian army marched up to Mount Haemus, where they met a Thracian garrison manning the heights. The Thracians had constructed a palisade of carts, which they intended to throw upon the approaching Macedonians. Alexander ordered his heavy infantry to march in loose formation and, when the carts were thrown, either to open the ranks or lie flat on the ground with their shields over them. When they came into range the Macedonian archers fired at the Thracians, disrupting their battle line, all the while the Macedonian heavy infantry marched on. When they reached the top of the ridge they dislodged and routed the Thracians.

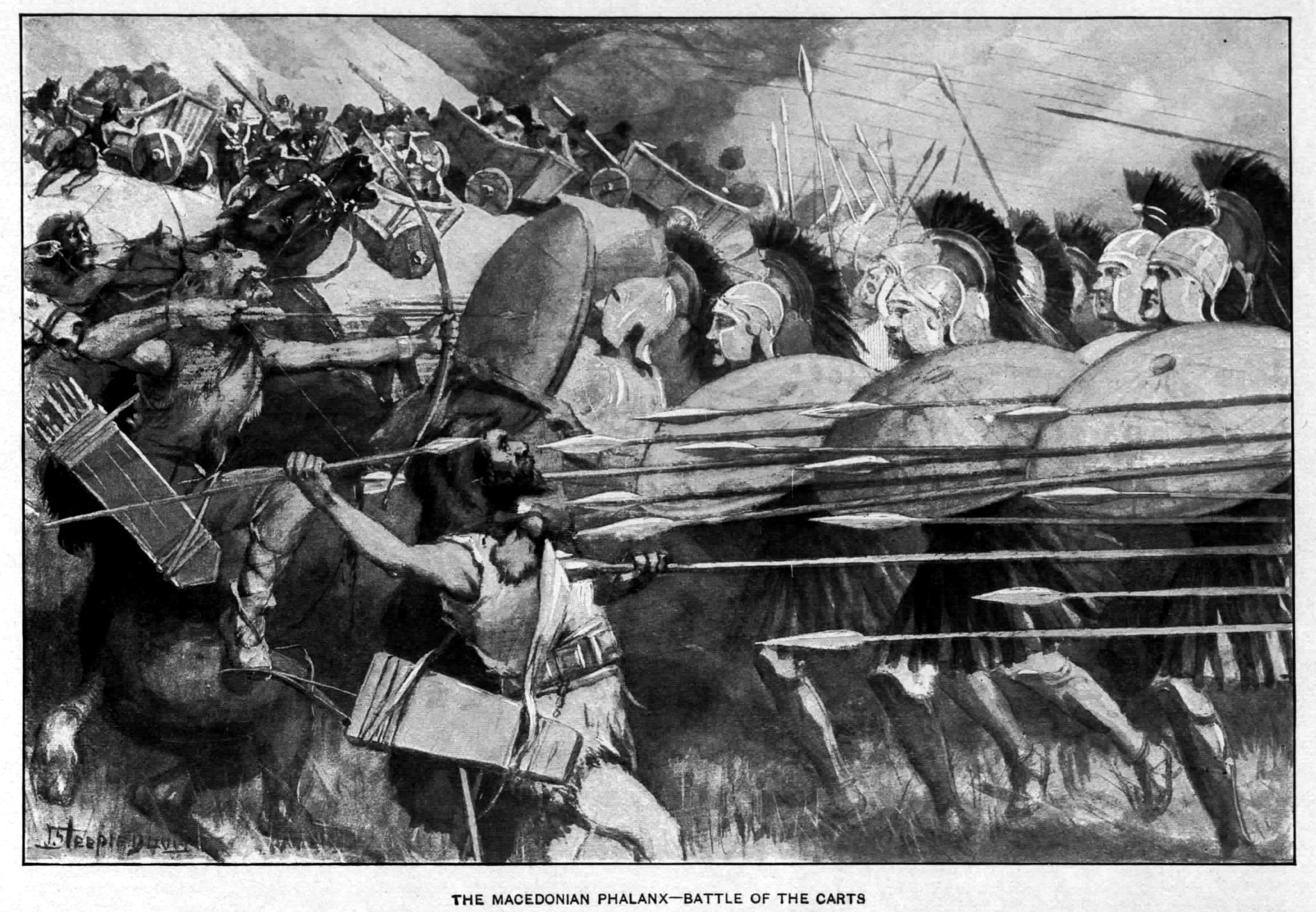
The Macedonian phalanx at the "Battle of the Carts" against the Thracians in 335 BC

Descending on the lands of the Triballians, Alexander found out that their king, Syrmus, had gathered his population near the River Lyginus. Hearing of the size of the Macedonian army Syrmus retreated to Peuce Island, an island in the middle of the Danube. When the Macedonian army marched on Syrmus, a second Triballian force advanced upon their rear. Alexander turned his army around and advanced on the second Triballian force. The Triballians retreated to a gorge, where they were drawn out by Alexander's light infantry. On the open ground, they were crushed by Alexander's infantry and cavalry, leaving behind 3,000 dead. Alexander brought ships up the Danube from Byzantium to use in an assault on the island. The attempts failed due to the swift current of the river, steep banks, and fierce defense. Eventually the Macedonians abandoned their attacks on Peuce and instead crossed into the territory of the Getae.

The Macedonians marched to the Danube where they encountered the Getae tribe on the opposite shore. As Alexander's ships failed to enter the river, Alexander's army made rafts out of their leather tents. A force of 4,000 infantry and 1,500 cavalry crossed the river, to the amazement of the Getae army of 14,000 men. The Getae army retreated after the first cavalry skirmish, leaving their town to the Macedonian army.

== Illyria ==
The Siege of Pelium was undertaken by Alexander the Great against the Illyrian tribes of what is modern day Albania. It was critical for Alexander to take this pass as it provided easy access to Illyria and Macedonia, which was urgently needed in order to quell the unrest in Greece at this time in Athens and Thebes. This was an important point of demarcation in Alexander's early reign, as it established him among the Danubian tribes to the north as a serious monarch to be reckoned with, just as he would later establish this precedent for the Greek city states under his hegemony. Taking this place allowed Alexander to march his army to southern Greece quickly, which would eventually result in the total destruction of Thebes.

== Thebes ==
The Battle of Thebes took place between Alexander III of Macedon and the Greek city state of Thebes in 335 BC immediately outside of and in the city proper. After having been made Hegemon of the League of Corinth, Alexander had marched to the north to deal with revolts in Illyria and Thrace. The garrison in Macedonia was weakened and Thebes declared its independence. The Thebans refused to submit on merciful terms, and he assaulted the city, razed it to the ground, and sold all the survivors into slavery.

With the destruction of Thebes, mainland Greece again acquiesced in Alexander's rule. Alexander was now finally free to undertake the Persian campaign which had been planned for so long by his father.

== See also ==
- Ancient Macedonian army

== Bibliography ==
- Arrian (1976). The Campaigns of Alexander. Translated by de Sélincourt, Aubrey. Penguin Books. ISBN 0-14-044253-7.
- Ashley, James R. (1998). The Macedonian Empire: The Era of Warfare Under Philip II and Alexander the Great, 359-323 B.C. Jefferson, North Carolina, London: McFarland and Company Inc. ISBN 0-7864-1918-0.
- Bose, Partha (2003). Alexander the Great's Art of Strategy. Allen & Unwin. ISBN 1-74114-113-3.
- Hammond, N. G. L.; Walbank, Frank William (2001). A History of Macedonia: 336-167 B.C. Vol. III. Oxford: Clarendon Press. ISBN 0-19-814815-1.
- Lane Fox, Robin (1973). Alexander the Great. Allen Lane. ISBN 0-86007-707-1.
- Lane Fox, Robin (1980). The Search for Alexander. Boston: Little Brown & Co. ISBN 0-316-29108-0.
- Plutarch (1988). The Age of Alexander. Translated by Scott-Kilvert, Ian. Penguin Classics. ISBN 0-14-044286-3.
- Renault, Mary (2001). The Nature of Alexander the Great. Penguin. ISBN 0-14-139076-X.
