= Baraliris =

Illyrian ruler

Baraliris was an imagined Illyrian ruler, who (according to Tertullian) after seeing a sign in a dream, embarked on a series of military victories which allowed him to extend Illyrian rule over the Molossians and other tribes, as far as the frontiers of Macedon. Probably the same as Bardyllis.
