= Grabos II =

4th-century BC Illyrian king

Grabus
- King

King of Taulantia
- Reign: c. 358–356 BC
- Ancient Greek: Γράβος

Grabus (also Grabos; Ancient Greek: Γράβος; ruled c. 358–356 BC) was an Illyrian king who reigned in southern Illyria in the 4th century BC.

== Biography ==
According to a historical reconstruction, Grabus belonged to the Grabaei, an Illyrian tribe mentioned by Pliny the Elder (23–79 AD), although the tribe may have been incorporated into the Taulantii realm of which Grabus became king. It has been further conjectured that after Philip II of Macedon defeated Bardylis (c. 358 BC), the Grabaei, under Grabus, became the most powerful tribe in Illyria.

In 356 BC, Athens formed an alliance with Grabus, Paeonian king Lyppeius, and Thracian king Cetriporis against Philip. Some months later the three northern kings were defeated by Philip's general Parmenion, while the Athenians were otherwise engaged in the Aegean Sea.

== See also ==
- List of rulers of Illyria

== Bibliography ==
- Hammond, N. G. L (1993). Studies concerning Epirus and Macedonia Before Alexander. Hakkert. ISBN 9789025610500.
- Hammond, N. G. L. (1994). "Illyrians and North-west Greeks". The Cambridge Ancient History Volume 6: The Fourth Century BC. Cambridge University Press: 422–443. doi:10.1017/CHOL9780521233484.017. ISBN 9780521233484.
- Harding, Phillip (1985). From the End of the Peloponnesian War to the Battle of Ipsus. Cambridge University Press. ISBN 978-0-521-29949-7.
- Lippert, Andreas; Matzinger, Joachim (2021). Die Illyrer: Geschichte, Archäologie und Sprache. Kohlhammer Verlag. ISBN 9783170377103.
