= Pleurias =

4th-century BC Illyrian king of the Autariatae

- Reign: c. 337 – c. 335 BC
- Ancient Greek: Πλευρίας

Pleurias (Ancient Greek Πλευρίας; ruled c. 337 – 335 BC) was an Illyrian king. According to some scholars Pleurias was probably king of the Autariatae. An Illyrian king called Pleurias is mentioned only in Diodorus (16.93.6). The name is elsewhere unattested in ancient sources, hence some scholars have identified him with Pleuratos, which is on the contrary a very common name among Illyrians.

According to Diodorus' historical account, in 337 BC Pleurias almost succeeded in killing Philip II of Macedon when he was on his Balkan campaigns.

== Military activities ==
In 337 BC, Philip's aim was to subdue the Autariatae State under Pleurias, during his Balkan campaigns. While Pleurias was engaged in a battle with Philip, he almost succeeded in killing Philip if not for his bodyguard Pausanias receiving Pleurias' sword. After receiving on his body all the blows directed at Philip, the Pausanias died.

In 335 BC, Pleurias entered into an alliance with Gluacias of the Taulantii State and Cleitus of the Dardanian State for the Illyrian Revolt. Cleitus had persuaded Pleurias to attack Alexander on his march south to meet him. On the meanwhile, Glaucias and Cleitus would join forces and meet Alexander at the city of Pelion in the south. Langarus, an ally of Alexander promised him that he would deal with the Autariatae State while Alexander would advance towards Cleitus. Langarus invaded their territory and defeated Pleurias, and thus brought a setback to Illyrian Revolt from the start.

In the 5th century BC the Autariatae State reached its peak of political and economic development. At the time of Pleurias' rule, the Autariatae State was in a decline due to the Celtic migrations. Pleurias's successors faced great hardship, and the gradual decline of the Autariatae State which ended in 310 BC with their sudden disappearance.

== See also ==
- List of rulers of Illyria

== Bibliography ==
- Howe, Timothy; Müller, Sabine; Stoneman, Richard (2017). Ancient Historiography On War and Empire. Oxbow Books. ISBN 978-1785703027.
