= Cleitus (son of Bardylis) =

Illyrian ruler from c. 356 to 335 BC

- Reign: c. 356–335 BC
- Predecessor: Bardylis
- Successor: Bardylis II
- Dynasty: Bardylis dynasty
- Father: Bardylis

Cleitus (Ancient Greek: Κλεῖτος; ruled c. 356–335 BC) was an Illyrian ruler, the son of the King Bardylis and the father of Bardylis II.

Cleitus was the mastermind behind the well-structured Illyrian Revolt of 335 BC. Cleitus entered into an agreement with the Taulantii State under Glaucias and the Autariatae State under Pleurias. Cleitus had captured and garrisoned the city of Pelion and waited for Glaucias' troops to arrive. However, Alexander arrived on the scene first and blockaded Cleitus within the city walls. Glaucias came to Cleitus' aid, and the Macedonians were forced to retreat. Alexander came back with more equipment and supplies and skillfully drove Glaucias' army from the surrounding heights, preventing Cleitus from engaging with Glaucias.

After a three-day truce, Alexander found the Taulantii camp unguarded and defeated the Illyrians under the cover of night. Cleitus managed to escape and likely kept his throne, probably ruling as a vassal under the Macedonian Kingdom. Cleitus was ruler of southern Illyrians, probably centered in Dassaretis.

== Biography ==
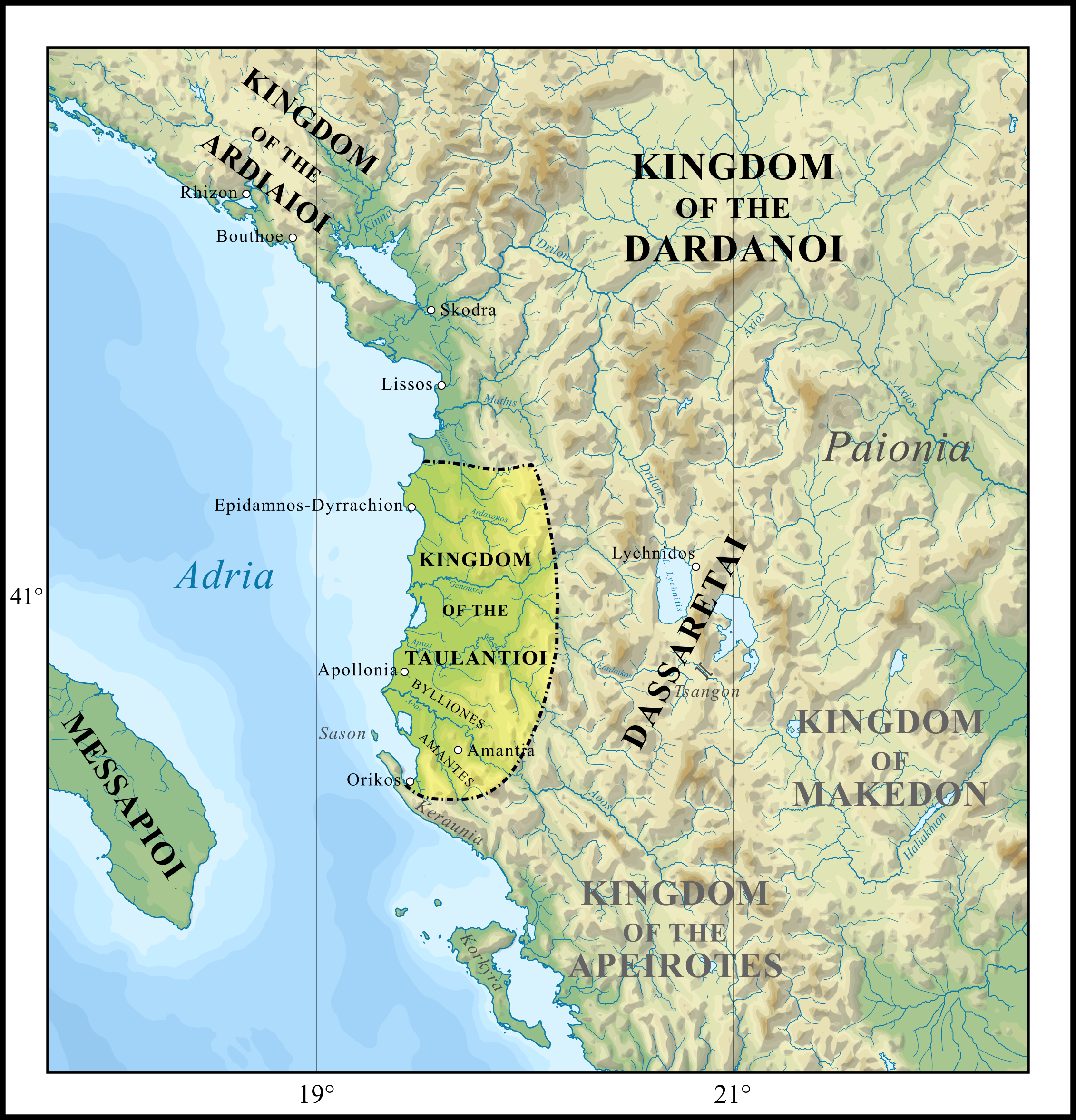
Illyrians after the rise of Macedon. The Illyrian realm of Cleitus had been a dependent territory of Macedon since at least Philip II's suppression of an Illyrian revolt in 349 BC, while the Taulantian kingdom under Glaukias remained independent.

Cleitus was attested as the son of Bardylis by Arrian (fl. c. 86/89 – c. after 146/160 AD) in The Anabasis of Alexander. Some modern historians consider Cleitus the grandson of the very old Bardylis I who defeated Perdiccas III in 359 and who died shortly thereafter at the age of more than ninety, and the son of Bardylis II; others consider Cleitus directly the son of Bardylis I, since nothing confirms such a generation gap and nothing allows to find out Cleitus's age in the year 335. Unlike Grabos II and Pleurias - Pleuratus, the designation "king of the Illyrians" never appears next to Cleitus in Arrian. In his military operations, Cleitus seems to treat Glaukias, the king of Taulanti, as his equal. Diodorus (fl. 1st century BC) recognizes Glaukias as the king of Illyrians after the disappearance of Cleitus. Therefore, Cleitus can be considered king of the Illyrians not particularly because he succeeded Bardylis, but because he led the Illyrians in the 335 BC uprising at Pelion.

== Rulership ==
=== Alliances for the Illyrian revolt ===
Cleitus was one of the three Illyrian kings who attempted to gain lost territory and thwart Macedonian power in a revolt. During Alexander's Balkan campaigns, alarming reports began to come from Illyria that the Illyrians had revolted and were poised to invade Macaedonia. The Illyrian revolt had a personal element to it; Cleitus led the revolt, and his father Bardyllis had been soundly defeated by Macedonia in 358 BC. Alexander found himself thrown headlong into one of the toughest campaigns of his entire career. Alexander's Danubian expedition had given Cleitus just the chance he was waiting for. Cleitus allied himself with Glaucias, king of the Taulantii State, and en route, he persuaded the Autariatae State to attack Alexander as well. Meanwhile, Glaucias' army would march to Cleitus, so the Macedonians would have to face this larger, combined force.

=== Battle of Pelion ===
In 335 BC, Alexander's ally Langarus promised to deal with the Autariatae while Alexander headed towards Cleitus. Langarus invaded their territory and defeated them. Alexander thus foiled Cleitus' plan of blockading the Macedonian army. Glaucias and his army had not yet reached Cleitus, and Alexander pushed hard to reach the Cleitus' fortress city of Pelion before Glaucias did. Alexander drove through Paeonia and Lynkestis, finally arriving at Pelion before Glaucias. The ancient historian Arrian states that Cleitus sacrificed three boys, three girls, and three black rams on an altar just before the Battle of Pelion with Alexander. The Illyrian advance detachments, after some brief skirmishing, retreated within the walls of Pelion. The Macedonians decided to blockade Pelion, bringing up their siege equipment. The Macedonians had no time in starving Cleitus out, and with so small a task force, their chances of taking the strongly guarded city fortress by storm were minimal. Glaucias was on his way to aid Cleitus, and the Macedonians were cut off and short of supplies. This was the first and last bitter taste of failure for Alexander.

A foraging party under the Macedonian general Philotas barely escaped annihilation thanks to quick action by Alexander and the cavalry. Early next morning, he formed up his entire army in the plain, apparently oblivious to the presence of Cleitus and the newly arrived Glaucias, and gave an exhibition of close-order drill. The bristling spear-line swung right and left in perfect unison. The phalanx advanced, wheeled into column and line, and moved through various intricate formations as though on the parade-ground, all without a word being uttered. The Illyrian kings had never seen anything like it. From their positions in the surrounding hills, the Illyrians stared down at this weird ritual, scarcely able to believe their eyes. Then little by little one Illyrian force began to edge closer. Alexander, watching their psychological movement, gave his final prearranged signal. The left wing of the cavalry swung into wedge formation and charged. At the same moment every man of the phalanx beat his spear on his shield yelling out the Macedonia war-cry. Glaucias' forces fled back in wild confusion from the heights to the safety of their city where Cleitus was. The last of the Illyrians from the knoll were flushed out while the Macedonians began to advance across the river.

The Illyrians, realizing the trap, rallied and counter-attacked. Alexander's cavalry and light-armed troops held them off from the knoll long enough for his siege catapults to be carried through the ford and set up on the further bank. The Macedonians withdrew a few miles and gave Cleitus and Glaucias three days to regain their confidence. The Illyrian camp lay wide open because of indiscipline; Glaucias dug no trenches and built no palisades, not even bothering to post sentries. Alexander returned with a specially picked mobile force, and he sent in his archers and the Agrianians to finish the job during the night. Most of the Illyrians were still asleep, and the Macedonian slaughtered them where they lay. In desperation, Cleitus set fire to Pelion, so it would not fall into Macedonian hands.

=== Aftermath ===
There was no time to capture Cleitus, or to negotiate a treaty with the Illyrians as Thebes and Boeotia suddenly revolted. Cleitus fled with Glaucias to the Taulantii State where he was offered shelter. Cleitus and Glaucias continued to rule, probably as vassal kings under Macedonia. Cleitus did not regroup his forces, so the Illyrians remained on amicable terms with Macedonia for the rest of Alexander's reign. They even sent a contingent of troops for Alexander's invasion of Persia. Alexander's superior skill as a general was enough of a deterrent to ensure that the Illyrian States remained passive. The year of Cletius' death is not known, but he was succeeded to the throne by his son Bardyllis II around 300–295 BC, although it is unlikely that he ruled that long.

== See also ==
- List of rulers of Illyria

== Bibliography ==
- Cabanes, Pierre (2002) [1988]. Dinko Čutura; Bruna Kuntić-Makvić (eds.). Iliri od Bardileja do Gencia (IV. – II. stoljeće prije Krista) [The Illyrians from Bardylis to Gentius (4th – 2nd century BC)] (in Croatian). Translated by Vesna Lisičić. Svitava. ISBN 953-98832-0-2.
- Fox, Robin Lane (2011). "Philip of Macedon:accession, ambitions, and self-presentation". In Robin J. Fox; Robin Lane Fox (eds.). Brill's Companion to Ancient Macedon: Studies in the Archaeology and History of Macedon, 650 BC - 300 AD. BRILL. ISBN 978-9004206502.
- Stipčević, Aleksandar (1974). The Illyrians: history and culture (1977 ed.). Noyes Press. ISBN 978-0815550525.
- Wilkes, John J. (1992). The Illyrians. Oxford, United Kingdom: Blackwell Publishing. ISBN 0-631-19807-5.
