= Glaucias of Taulantii =

Illyrian Taulantian king from c.335 to c.295 BC

Glaucias
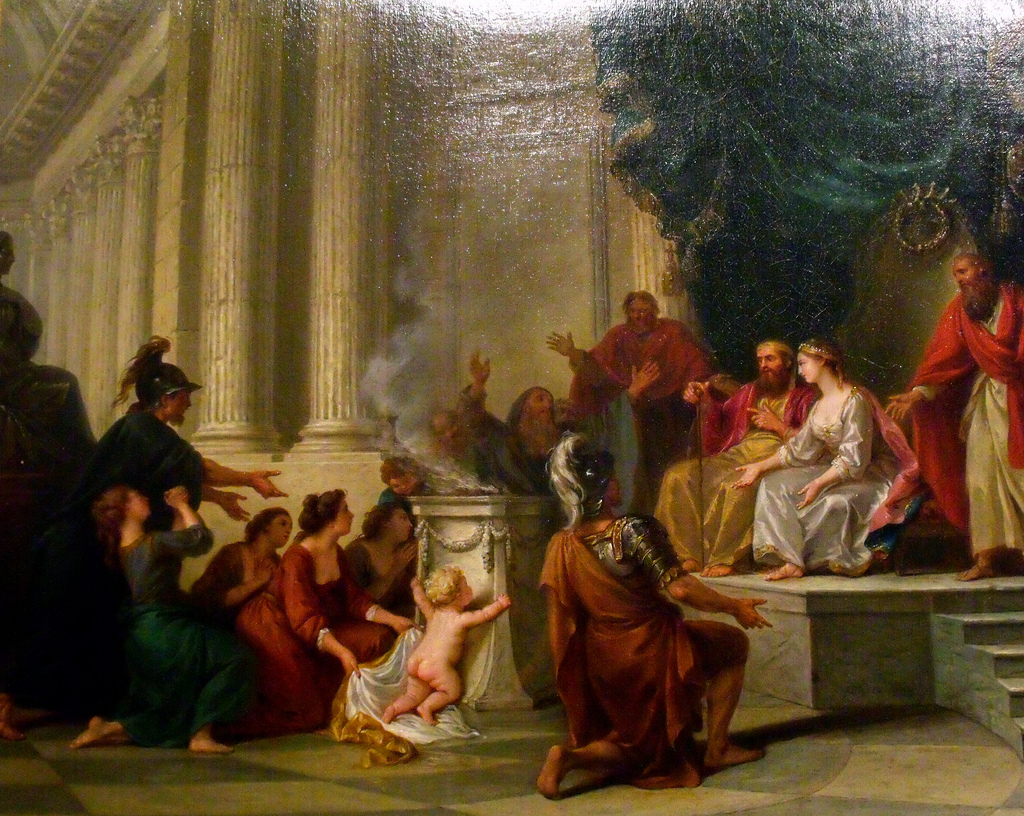
- Child Pyrrhus presented to Glaucias
- Reign: c. 335 – c. 295 BC
- Predecessor: Pleuratus I
- Successor: Bardyllis II
- Consort: Beroea
- Ancient Greek: Γλαυκίας
- Father: Pleuratus I

Glaucias (Ancient Greek: Γλαυκίας; ruled c. 335 – c. 295 BC) was a ruler of the Taulantian kingdom, situated in modern day Albania, which dominated southern Illyrian affairs in the second half of the 4th century BC. Glaucias is first mentioned as bringing a considerable force to the assistance of Bardylis' son Cleitus, an Illyrian prince who revolted against Alexander the Great, in the battle of Pelium 335 BC. They were, however, both defeated, and Cleitus was forced to take refuge within the Taulantian territories, whither Alexander did not pursue him, his attention being called elsewhere by the news of the revolt of Thebes.

We next hear of Glaucias, nearly 20 years later, as affording an asylum to the infant Pyrrhus, when his father Aeacides was driven out of Epirus; Glaucias' wife Beroea belonged to the Molossian Aeacidae. By this measure he gave offence to Cassander, who sought to gain possession of Epirus for himself, and who in vain offered Glaucias 200 talents to give up the child.

Not long after, the Macedonian king invaded his territories, and defeated him in battle; but though Glaucias bound himself by the treaty which ensued to refrain from hostilities against the allies of Cassander, he still retained Pyrrhus at his court, and, after the death of Alcetas II of Epirus, in 307 BC, he took the opportunity to invade Epirus with an army, and establish the young prince, then 12 years old, upon the throne. The territories of Glaucias bordered upon those of Apollonia and Epidamnos, and this proximity involved him in frequent hostilities with those states. In 312 BC he gained control of Epidamnus. The date of his death is not mentioned, but it appears that he was still reigning in 302 BC, when Pyrrhus repaired to his court, to be present at the marriage of one of his sons.

== Biography ==
=== Early rulership ===
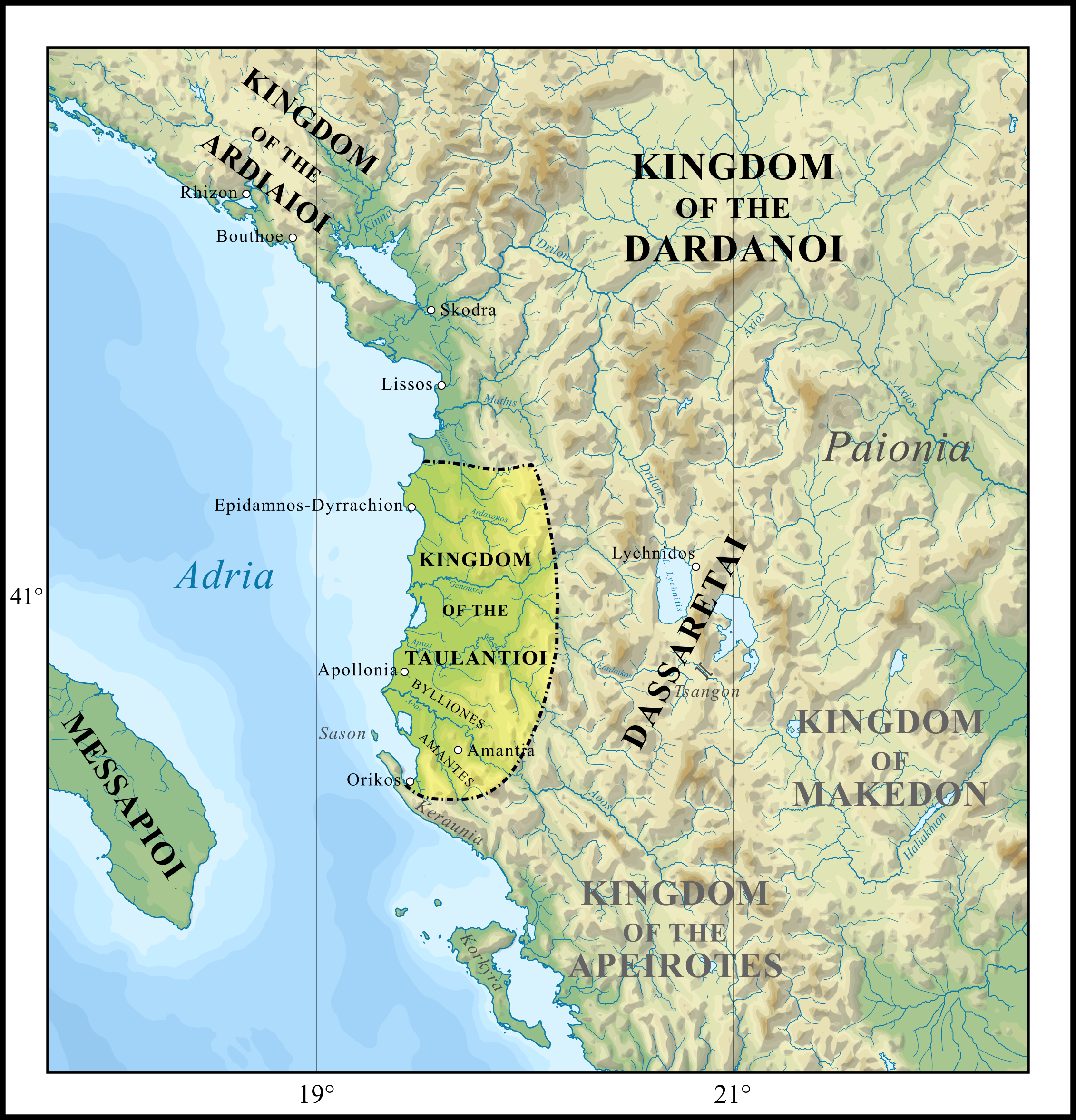
Illyrians after the rise of Macedon. The Illyrian realm of Cleitus had been a dependent territory of Macedon since at least Philip II's suppression of an Illyrian revolt in 349 BC, while the Taulantian kingdom under Glaukias remained independent.

In 344 BC, Glaukias' father Pleuratus I engaged in battle with Philip II of Macedon. In a losing effort Pleuratus I, tried to thwart Philip's advances in Illyria and managed to wound Philip himself and fifty of his elite forces on their pursuit. Philip was wounded and lost part of his close group of friends, finally contenting himself with the possession of the Illyrian region of Dassaretia. After this, Isocrates delimits the Taulantii state only to the lands along the Adriatic. It seems that during his early reign, probably before 335 BC, Glaucias and Alexander might have had quite friendly relations, although this is not known for sure. As a royal page Alexander had accompanied his father Philip II on the Illyrian campaigns. In 337 BC he had escorted his mother Olympias to Epirus and gone from there to Illyria where he stayed with one or more kings, perhaps indeed with Glaucias. Alexander might have also had relations living in Illyria at that time and took shelter there when he quarrelled with his father. King Glaukias and the Taulantii had not accepted Macedonian rule, and remained independent. While the Illyrian Cleitus, son of Bardylis, was subject king of Macedonia since at least Philip's suppression of an Illyrian revolt in 349 BC. However in 335 BC Cleitus revolted against Alexander, and before the conflict with Macedon, he assured the support of Glaucias and his Taulantii.

=== Conflict against Alexander ===
==== Background ====
News of Illyrian offensive preparations in 335 BC reached Alexander when he was probably in Agrianian territory. The Autariatae tribe under Pleurias planned to attack him from the north, Cleitus the Illyrian had risen in revolt and Glaucias had entered into an alliance and joined Cleitus' cause. Cleitus had occupied the city of Pelion, a fortified site in eastern Dassaretia, an Illyrian canton. Pelion lay on the Illyrian side of Wolf's Pass (Qafa e Ujkut). Since Philip's annexation of this part of Illyria, Little Lake Prespa lay on the Macedonian side. Pelion at the time was the strongest settlement in the region and it was favourably located for attacks into Macedonia.

==== Battle of Pelium ====
Alexander found that Cleitus had not only occupied Pelion but also the surrounding heights, which look down on the city and cover the approach to Wolf's Pass. It was evident that he was waiting for Glaucias to arrive. Alexander wanted to strike at Cleitus first. He therefore pitched and fortified a camp on the river Eordaicus in full sight of the Illyrians, and next morning he moved his army up to the wall of Pelion. This move brought the Illyrians down from the heights in order to attack the Macedonians in the flanks and the rear. Alexander promptly about-turned his army and routed the Illyrians.

Alexander decided next to build a wall around Pelion, so that he could blockade the city and his army could operate inside its own defences. Next day Glaucias, at the head of a large army, came from the plain of Koritsa through the Tsangon pass and joined forces with Cleitus. Alexander was heavily outnumbered and knew for the first and last time the bitter taste of failure. He acted at once, sending his baggage train of horse-drawn wagons with an escort of cavalry under Philotas to round up supplies in the plain of Koritsa. Glaucias having failed to guard the Tsangon pass with sufficient care, enabled the Macedonians to proceed about their foraging. Glaucias now rectified his mistake and occupied both sides of the pass in the hope of catching Philotas' foraging party on its return. Alexander divided his forces. Leaving sufficient troops with the Illyrian garrison penned up inside Pelion, he marched to the Tsangon pass with the Hypaspists, archers and Agrianians and two squadrons of cavalry, some 5,000 men in total, and cleared the pass. Glaucias' Taulantians did not even put up a fight, and the baggage train returned in safety.

The effect of this success could only be short lived in terms of supply. The troops of Glaucias and Cleitus seemed still to have caught Alexander in a difficult position for the Illyrians held the commanding heights with large numbers of cavalry, large numbers of javelin-men and slingers, and had heavy-armed infantry as well. The next morning Alexander's plan was not to retreat, but to advance through the middle of the Illyrian forces, thereby keeping them divided and his own men united. In order to do so, he had to deceive the Illyrians and then seize the narrow passage, namely the Wolf's pass, confined between the river on one side and high cliffs on the other side and admitting only four men abreast at its narrowest point.

Next morning the deception was achieved by a superb piece of drill. The Macedonians paraded on the flat plain, without its baggage train, but with its catapults, which led the Illyrians under Glaucias and Cleitus to expect an assault upon the walls of Pelion. The drill was executed by the phalanx in a solid block of men, 100 men wide and 120 men deep, and by a squadron of 200 cavalry on each flank. Glaucias had a grandstand view from the battlements of Pelion and the surrounding heights, was amazed by the precision of the drill and bewildered by the changing movements. Suddenly Alexander formed the left front of the phalanx into a wedge (embolon) and charged Cleitus' troops on the nearest slopes. The Illyrians fled at the mere onset on this attack. Next the Macedonians using warlike threats, forced Glaucias' army to withdraw towards Pelion.

Three days later Alexander mounted a night attack. The Illyrians had assumed that Alexander had fled for good, so had bivouacked their men over a wide area and had not built field defences or mount guards. Learning of their dispositions, the Macedonians came back at night, leading the Hypaspists, archers and Agrianians, and two phalanx brigades (in all over 7,000 men). The Illyrians were devastated by the Macedonians who struck in a deep formation at the very end of the Illyrian line, killing many in their beds and started a panic which became a rout as the infantry line poured through the gap and rolled up the Illyrian line from east to west. Cleitus and that part of his army under his immediate command, escaped into Pelion, but the rest suffered the thoroughness of the cavalry pursuit which continued to the mountains of Glaucias' state, some 95 km away. Cleitus burnt Pelion in order to not let it fall into the hands of the Macedonians, and went to join Glaucias in the region of what is now Tirana.

==== Aftermath ====
The escape and victory of Alexander and his army brought home to the Illyrians how much had changed since they had brought Macedonia to its knees barely 50 years before under the command of Bardyllis. In 334 BC a number of Illyrian infantrymen served in Alexander's expeditionary force and many more Illyrian troops were later to serve Alexander in Asia. Glaucias though defeated by the Macedonians, survived as king for another 30 years.

=== Conflict against Cassander ===
In 317 BC Glaucias was in league with the two Greek colonies of Epidamnus and Apollonia as well as with the island of Corcyra while Cassander of Macedon was at a low ebb. In 314 BC Cassander attacked Apollonia, capturing the city at the first assault. After he advanced north and crossed the Genusus river, Cassander defeated Glaucias' army, and by simulating a feigned retreat he tricked the people of Epidamnus. Thereafter he placed a garrison in the city. After a treaty Cassander left Glaucias on his throne under condition not to attack the allies of the Macedonian king.

In 313 BC the treaty collapsed. Glaucias laid siege to Apollonia in 312 BC and with the help of the Spartan Acrotatus, took away the Macedonian garrison. Meanwhile, trouble arose in Epirus. Corcyra, taking advantage of this situation, sent help to Apollonia and Epidamnus, overpowered Cassander's garrison in the latter and gave the city to Glaucias. Apollonia was now free and hostile to Macedonia. Before gaining control of Epidamnus, Glaucius' forces were joined by the oligarchy of the city who had been expelled by the democrats and the Corcyraeans.

=== Adopting Pyrrhus: Epirote affairs ===
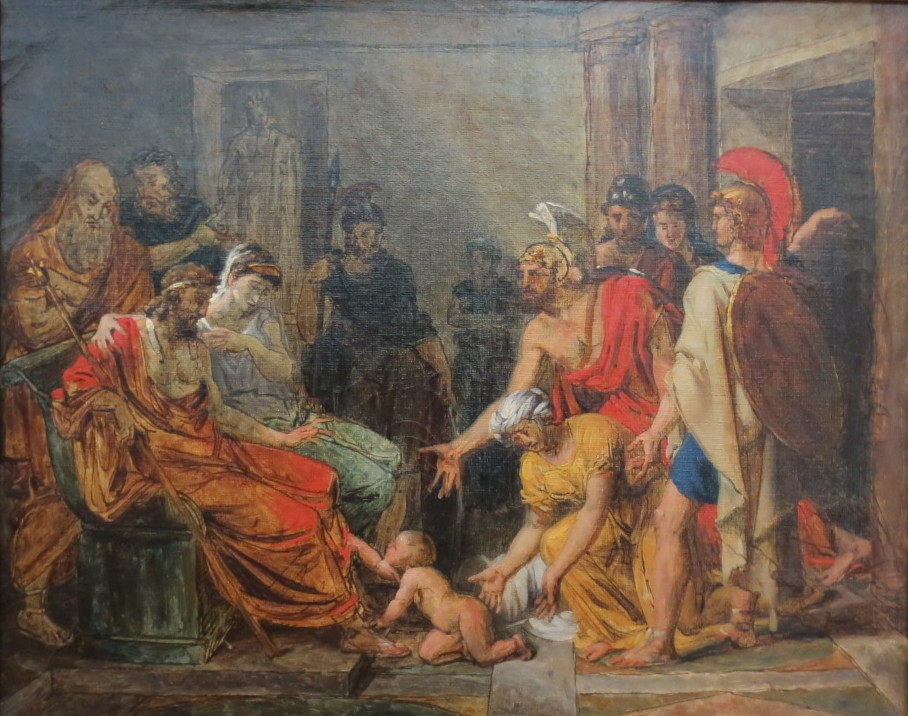
The young Pyrrhus at the court of King Glaukias by Hyacinthe Collin de Vermont, c. 1750.

In 317 BC, six years after the death of Alexander and with power in Macedonia in the hands of Cassander, Glaucias offered asylum to the infant Pyrrhus after the expulsion of his father Aeacides from his kingdom among the Molossians. Plutarch describes that after eluding their pursuers, they arrived in Illyria, and finding Glaucias at home with his wife, they placed the baby on the ground between their feet. Pyrrhus crawled by himself on all fours up to Glaucias and, having caught his robe, rose on his feet by holding onto the King's knees. Glaucias laughed and then sent Pyrrhus to his wife, Beroea, and ordered her to raise him along with his other sons. Although Cassander promised Glaucias 200 talents, he did not hand Pyrrhus over to him. Glaucias' wife Beroea was herself a Molossian princess. Pyrrhus grew to manhood safe with Glaucias in the Taulantii state.

In 307 BC, Glaucias invaded Epirus with an army, put the anti-Cassander party in power in Molossia, and placed the twelve-year-old Pyrrhus on the throne with guardians from the anti-Cassander party. In this way Glaucias challenged Macedonia for the second time after the Battle of Pelion in 335 BC. This was not simply a sentimental action by Glaucias, but more an attempt to secure the existence of his own state, constantly under attack from Macedonia by having Epirus as an ally. In 303/2 BC Pyrrhus came to the court of Glaucias, his adoptive father, to attend the marriage of one of his sons.

The date of Glaucius' death is not mentioned, but it appears that he was still reigning in 302 BC, when Pyrrhus travelled to his court, to be present at the marriage of one of his sons. It is not sure if Bardyllis II and Pyrrhus both absorbed or inherited the Taulantii state after Glaucias.

== See also ==
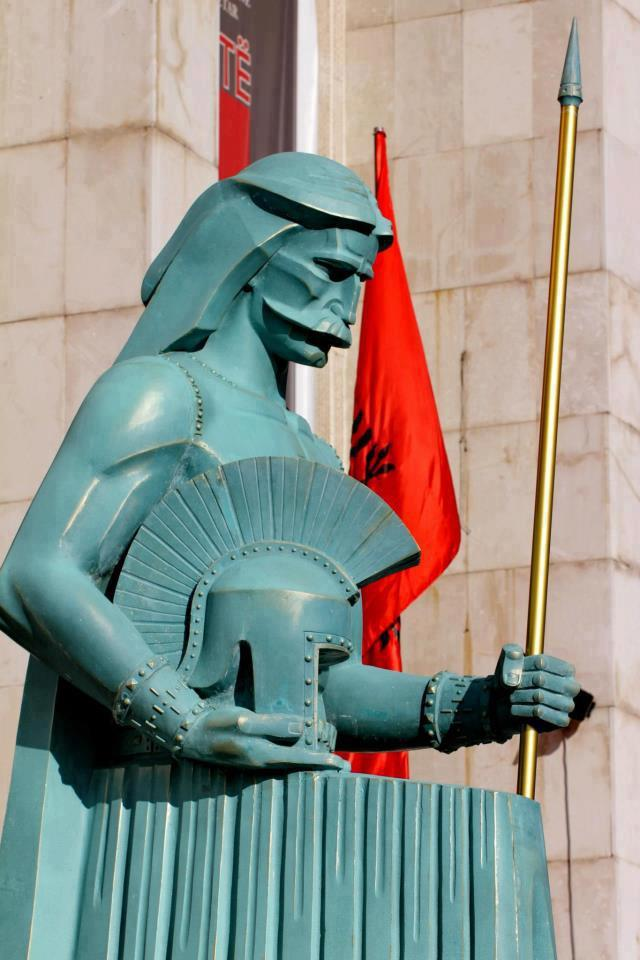
A modern statue depicting Glaucias in Tirana, Albania

- Illyrian warfare
- List of rulers of Illyria
