= Bardylis II =

Illyrian king from c. 295 to c. 290 BC

- Reign: c. 295 – c. 290 BC
- Predecessor: (?) Cleitus or Glaucias
- Successor: (?) Monounios
- Issue: Bircenna
- Ancient Greek: Βάρδυλις
- Father: Cleitus (presumably)

Bardylis II (Ancient Greek: Βάρδυλις; ruled c. 295 – 290 BC) was an Illyrian king, and presumably the son of Cleitus, and grandson of Bardylis. He was the father of Bircenna, wife of Pyrrhus of Epirus. Bardylis II is the only attested Illyrian king after Glaucias' death. He may have succeeded Glaucias on the throne as the grandson of Bardylis I, or alternatively he may have reigned independently after his father Cleitus somewhere in Dassaretia, in an area located nearer the Macedonian border. At that time Bardylis II was evidently the most powerful king in Illyria who could unite the largest number of Illyrian tribes under his rule.

== Biography ==
Bardylis II, also called Bardylis the Younger, was presumably the son of Cleitus and grandson of Bardylis, both enemies of the Macedonian kingdom.

A feat of these dimensions could be achieved only through war against Macedonia and, apparently, also against the heirs of Glaucias. Bardylis II might have absorbed or inherited Glaucias' Taulantii State. Pyrrhus waged a war against the Illyrians and conquered the Illyrian capital, although the location of the Illyrian capital at that time is not known. Thus, Bardylis II and Pyrrhus might have shared Glaucias' Taulantii State. The king became a client king to Pyrrhus since Pyrrhus' power and hatred of Macedon made him an attractive ally to Bardylis II. Bardylis II became Pyrrhus' father-in-law when his daughter Bircenna became one of the wives of Pyrrhus, proving his power in southern Illyria.

== See also ==
- List of rulers of Illyria

== Bibliography ==
- King, Carol J. (2017). Ancient Macedonia. Routledge. ISBN 9780415827287.
- Šašel Kos, Marjeta (2002). "Pyrrhus and Illyrian Kingdom(s?)". Greek Influence Along the East Adriatic Coast. Knjiga Mediterana. 26: 101–119. ISBN 9531631549.
- Šašel Kos, Marjeta (2005). Appian and Illyricum. Narodni muzej Slovenije. ISBN 961616936X.
