= Epidamnos =

Greek colony in Illyria, later Roman and Byzantine stronghold

Dyrrhachion (Epidamnos)
- Δυρράχιον / Ἐπίδαμνος (Greek)
- Dyrrhachium (Lat.), Dyrrah, Durrës
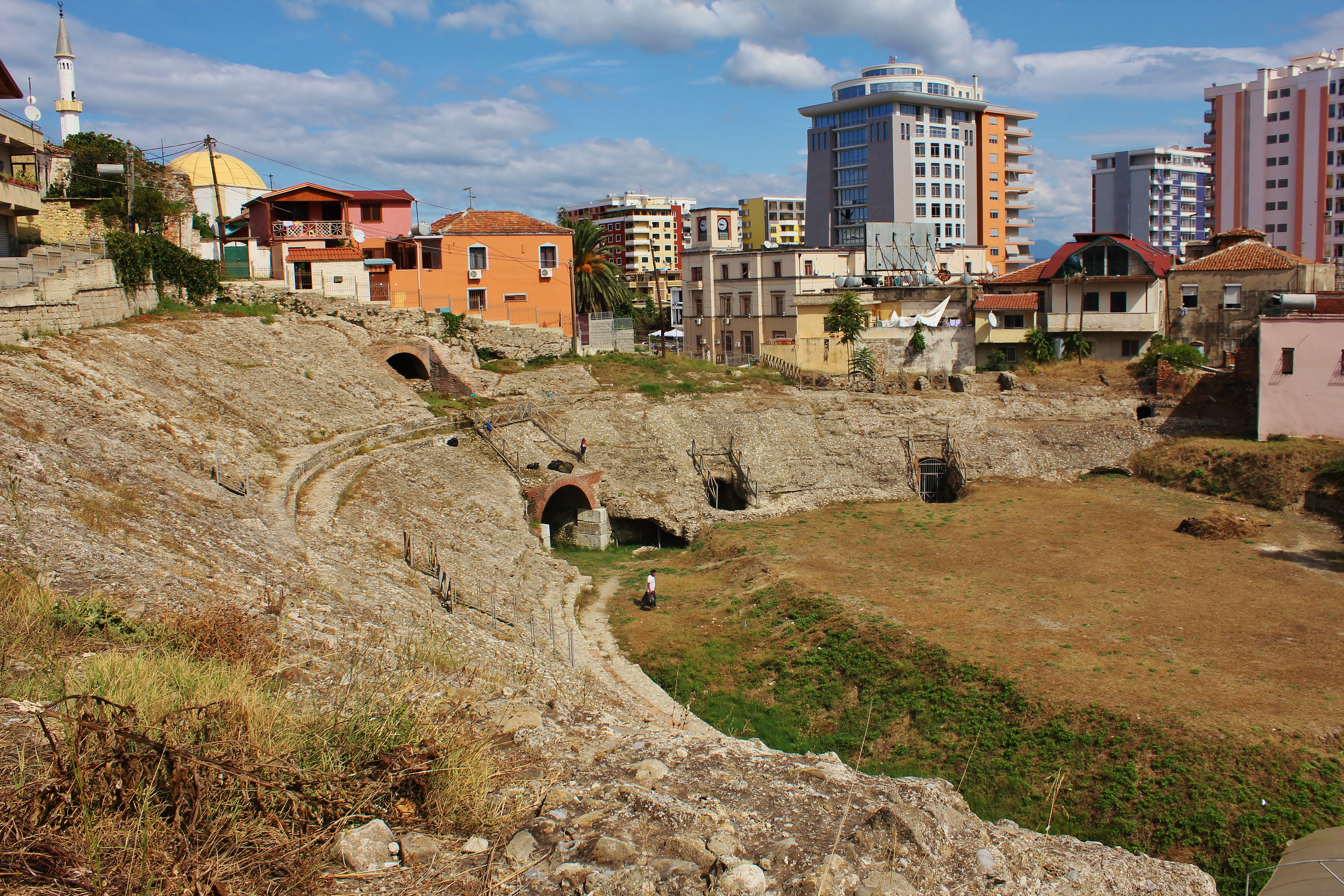
- The amphitheater of Durrës

- Location within Albania
- 41°16′N 19°30′E
- Type: Settlement
- Periods: Archaic Greek; Classical; Hellenistic; Roman; Byzantine; Medieval
- Cultures: Greek, Illyrian, Roman, Byzantine
- Location: Durrës, Durrës County, Albania
- Region: Adriatic coast, Illyria
- Part of: Durrës

History
- Built: 7th century BC

Dyrrhachion (Latin: Dyrrhachium; Ancient Greek: Δυρράχιον), originally founded as Epidamnos (Ancient Greek: Ἐπίδαμνος, Albanian: Epidamn), was a prominent city on the Adriatic coast, located in the territory of the Illyrian Taulantii and corresponding to modern Durrës, Albania. Founded around 627 BC by settlers from Corinth and Corcyra (modern Corfu), the city developed into a major political, commercial, and military hub. While established as a Greek colony, Epidamnos stood within Taulantii territory and long remained entangled with Illyrian power, before becoming a key Roman and later Byzantine stronghold.

== Archaic, Classical and Greek period (7th century BC – 3rd century BC) ==
Epidamnos was established in a strategic coastal location, facilitating maritime trade and interaction with the Illyrians, making it a vital trading hub between the wider Greek world and the Taulantii hinterland. The Taulantii tribe played a key role in the city's development, and evidence suggests a degree of cultural fusion between the Greek settlers and the indigenous Illyrians. The Taulantii exerted territorial control and at times direct overlordship, even as the polis maintained Greek civic institutions.

Politically, Epidamnos was governed as an oligarchy, with power concentrated among the aristocracy. Trade with local Illyrians was tightly regulated through the city agent or poletes.. When exiled oligarchs appealed to Corcyra, while democrats sought Corinth's support, Epidamnos became the flashpoint of the Corcyra–Corinth conflict that triggered the Peloponnesian War (431–404 BC), as Thucydides records.

Internal tensions gradually shifted power toward a more democratic system, with Aristotle later citing Epidamnos in Politics, as an example of an oligarchy evolving under pressure by appointing a ruling magistrate.

In the 4th century BC the city-state was part of the kingdoms of Cassander and Pyrrhus. The general vicinity of Epidamnos was called Epidamnia. Pyrrhus, one of the most formidable opponents of Rome, used Epidamnos as a strategic base in his campaigns.

== Roman period (3rd century BC – 4th century AD) ==
Epidamnos was seized by the Romans in 229 BC during their first campaign against Illyrian forces, the first Illyrian War, however, the city managed to maintain semi-autonomy and turned into a roman colony. Due to its strategic location along the Adriatic, Rome transformed the city into an important transit point, renaming it Dyrrachium to avoid the negative connotations of "Epidamnos" (which resembled the Latin word damnum, meaning "loss"). Despite this, the name Dyrrachion had already been used on local coins as early as the 5th century BC, due to the fact that in the Roman period, Dyrrachium was more common. Pausanias (6.x.8) says "the modern Roman city is not the ancient one, being at a short distance from it. The modern city is called Dyrrhachium from its founder."

Dyrrachium played a crucial role as the main port for Roman travelers crossing the Ionian Sea from Brundisium (modern Brindisi) in Italy. It served as the starting point of the Via Egnatia, the major military and trade route connecting Roman Illyria with Macedonia and Thrace, leading to key cities such as Thessalonica and Byzantium (later Constantinople).

In 48 BC, Dyrrachium became a battleground during the civil war between Julius Caesar and Pompey. Pompey successfully defended the city but failed to capitalize on his advantage, leading to his decisive defeat at Pharsalus. Under the Roman Empire, the city remained an important administrative center, and in AD 345, a devastating earthquake led to its reconstruction on its old foundations.

== Byzantine and medieval period ==
Dyrrachium became the capital of the newly established Roman province of Epirus Nova in the late 3rd century AD, reinforcing its religious and administrative importance. Its bishopric was elevated to a metropolitan see, overseeing the dioceses of the province. The city's fortifications were reinforced under Emperor Justinian I in the 6th century to defend against barbarian invasions.

In the 9th century, Emperor Nikephoros I reorganized the province as the Theme of Dyrrachium, an important Byzantine military district. The city served as a key stronghold against Slavic and Norman incursions, playing a pivotal role in the empire's defense of the Adriatic coast. The Normans, under Robert Guiscard, besieged and captured Dyrrachium in 1081, only for the Byzantines to reclaim it later.

Throughout the Middle Ages, control of Dyrrachium frequently shifted between the Byzantines, Venetians, and the Despotate of Epirus. The Byzantines continued to refer to the city by its original name, Epidamnus, as late as the 13th century, as recorded in the Synopsis Chronike.

== Legacy and modern significance ==
Dyrrachium, now Durrës, remains one of Albania's most historically significant cities. Its ancient ruins, including remnants of Roman roads, an amphitheater, and Byzantine fortifications, stand as testaments to its rich and complex past. Its strategic location on the Adriatic continues to make it a crucial economic and cultural center in the region.

== See also ==
- List of settlements in Illyria
- Greek colonisation
- Archaeological Museum of Durrës
