= Bircenna =

Queen to Pyrrhus of Epirus

Queen of Epirus
- Tenure: c. 292 BC – c. 272 BC
- Spouse: Pyrrhus of Epirus
- Issue: Helenus
- Greek: Βιρκέννα
- Father: Bardylis II

Bircenna (Ancient Greek: Βιρκέννα; ruled c. 292 – 272 BC) was an Illyrian princess and later an Epirote queen.

Bircenna was the daughter of Bardylis II, and granddaughter of Cleitus. Bircenna was the fourth out of the five wives of Pyrrhus of Epirus; she married him around 292 BC. Pyrrhus married Bircenna for diplomatic reasons and to increase his power in southern Illyria as he was an ally of Bircenna's father. Bircenna had a son named Helenus, who at an early age accompanied his father in his ambitious campaigns conducted in the Italian Peninsula. Lanassa, one of the wives of Pyrrhus, left him because she claimed that he took better care of his 'barbarian' wives.

== See also ==
- Bardyllis
- Cleitus the Illyrian
- Bardyllis II
