= Pleuratus I =

Illyrian king (ruled 356 – 335 BC)

- King

King of Taulantia
- Reign: 356–335 BC
- Successor: Glaucias of Taulantii
- Ancient Greek: Πλευρᾶτος
- Dynasty: Taulantia

Pleuratus I (Ancient Greek: Πλευρᾶτος; ruled 356–335 BC) was an Illyrian king of the Illyrian tribe of the Taulantii. Pleuratus was the father of Glaucias. Pleuratus managed to defeat Philip II during Macedon's expansion, wounding the Macedonian king in the right leg.

== Military activities ==
In 344 BC, Philip II had inherited from his father a quarrel with the Illyrians and found no means of reconciling his disagreement. Philip therefore invaded the Taulantii State with a large force, devastated the countryside, captured many cities and towns and returned to Macedonia laden with booty. After Philip's reduction of the Grabaei, Pleuratus, in a losing effort, tried to thwart Philip's advances in Illyria and succeeded in wounding one hundred and fifty of his elite corps and Hippostratus the son of Amyntas, in their pursuit of Pleuratus. Philip himself was wounded and lost part of his close group of friends, the hetairoi, contenting himself with the possession of the eastern Illyrian province of Dassaretia. Philip's advances into the Taulantii State ceased by coming to peace terms with Pleurtaus.

After this conflict the Taulantii State of Pleuratus was limited only to the lands along the Adriatic. However, this state continued an anti-Macedonian policy down to 335 BC when Glaucias and Cleitus rebelled against Alexander the Great.

== See also ==
- List of rulers of Illyria

== Bibliography ==
- Zindel, Christian; Lippert, Andreas; Lahi, Bashkim; Kiel, Machiel (2018). Albanien: Ein Archäologie- und Kunstführer von der Steinzeit bis ins 19. Jahrhundert (in German). Vandenhoeck & Ruprecht. ISBN 9783205200109.
