= Autariatae =

Illyrian people

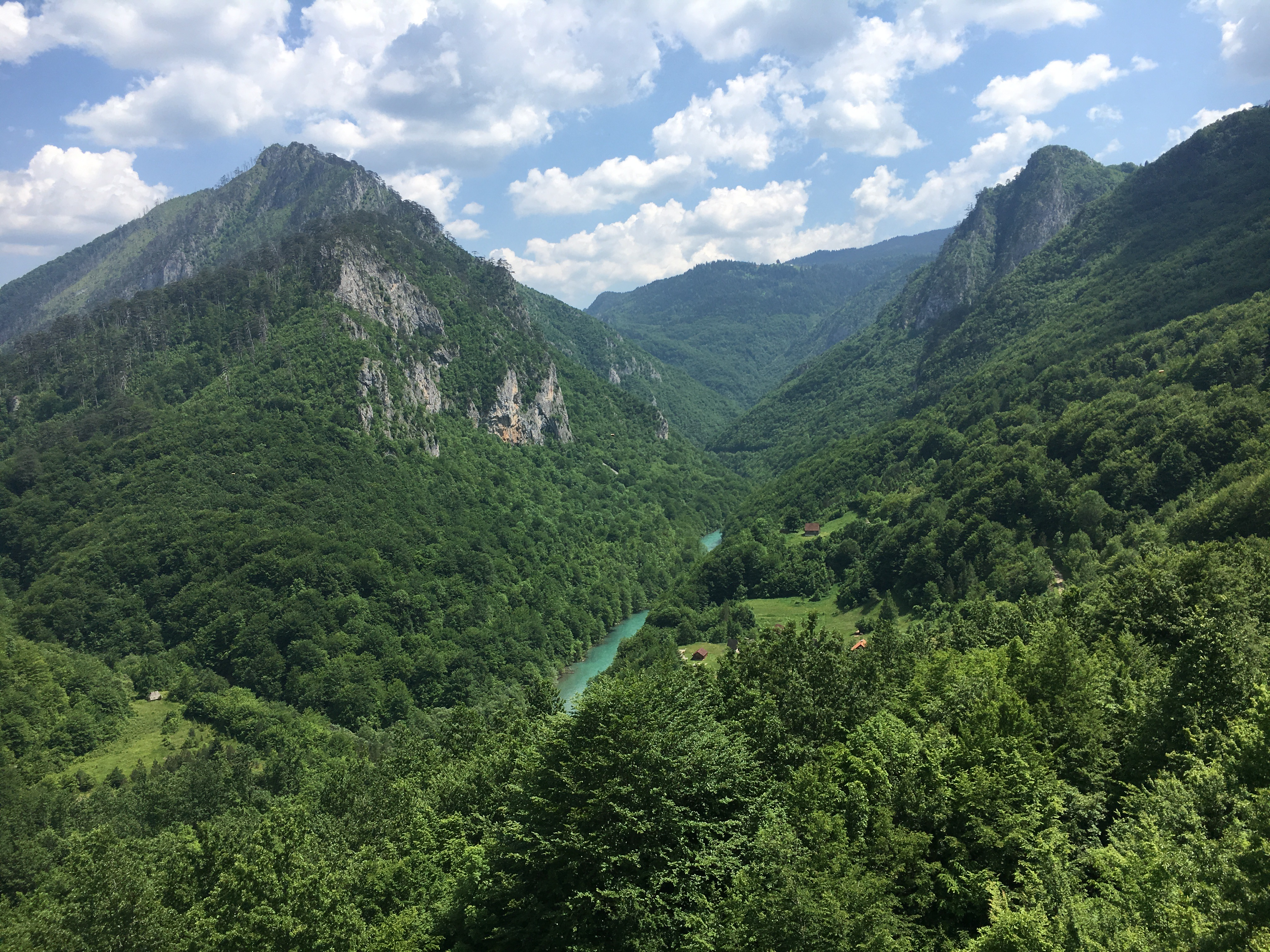
The Tara River canyon at Đurđevića Tara in Montenegro. The name Tara is thought to be related to the Autariatae, whose territory included the river valley in classical antiquity.

Map of Autariatae inhabited and controlled lands

The Autariatae or Autariatai (alternatively, Autariates; Albanian: Autariatët, Ancient Greek: Αὐταριᾶται, Autariatai; Latin: Autariatae) were an Illyrian people that lived between the valleys of the Lim and the Tara, beyond the Accursed Mountains, and the valley of West Morava. Their territory was located inland from the Ardiaei and the Lake Skodra, extending east to the Dardani and north or northeast to the Triballi.

Along with the Ardiaei and the Dardani, the Autariatae are mentioned by Strabo in his Geographica as one of the three strongest Illyrian peoples in the pre-Roman Balkans. Following defeat during the Celtic invasions of the Balkans in the 4th century, a part of the Autariatae who remained in Bosnia adopted Celtic culture later in their history. Another part moved southwards and after an agreement with the Kingdom of Macedonia, 20,000 settled in the Parorbelian mountain range, in the borderlands between modern southeastern North Macedonia, northern Greece and southwestern Bulgaria.

== Name ==
An Illyrian people named Αὐταριᾶται, Autariatai was firstly recorded in the Periplus of Pseudo-Skylax dating back to the middle of the 4th century BC. According to a mythological tradition reported by Appian (2nd century AD), the Autariatae descended from a common progenitor called Autarieus, one of the sons of Illyrius, the eponymous ancestor of all the Illyrian peoples. The name Autariatae has been connected to the hydronym and oronym Tara. The Tara river and Tara mountain are both considered to have been located in Autariatan territory.

== History ==
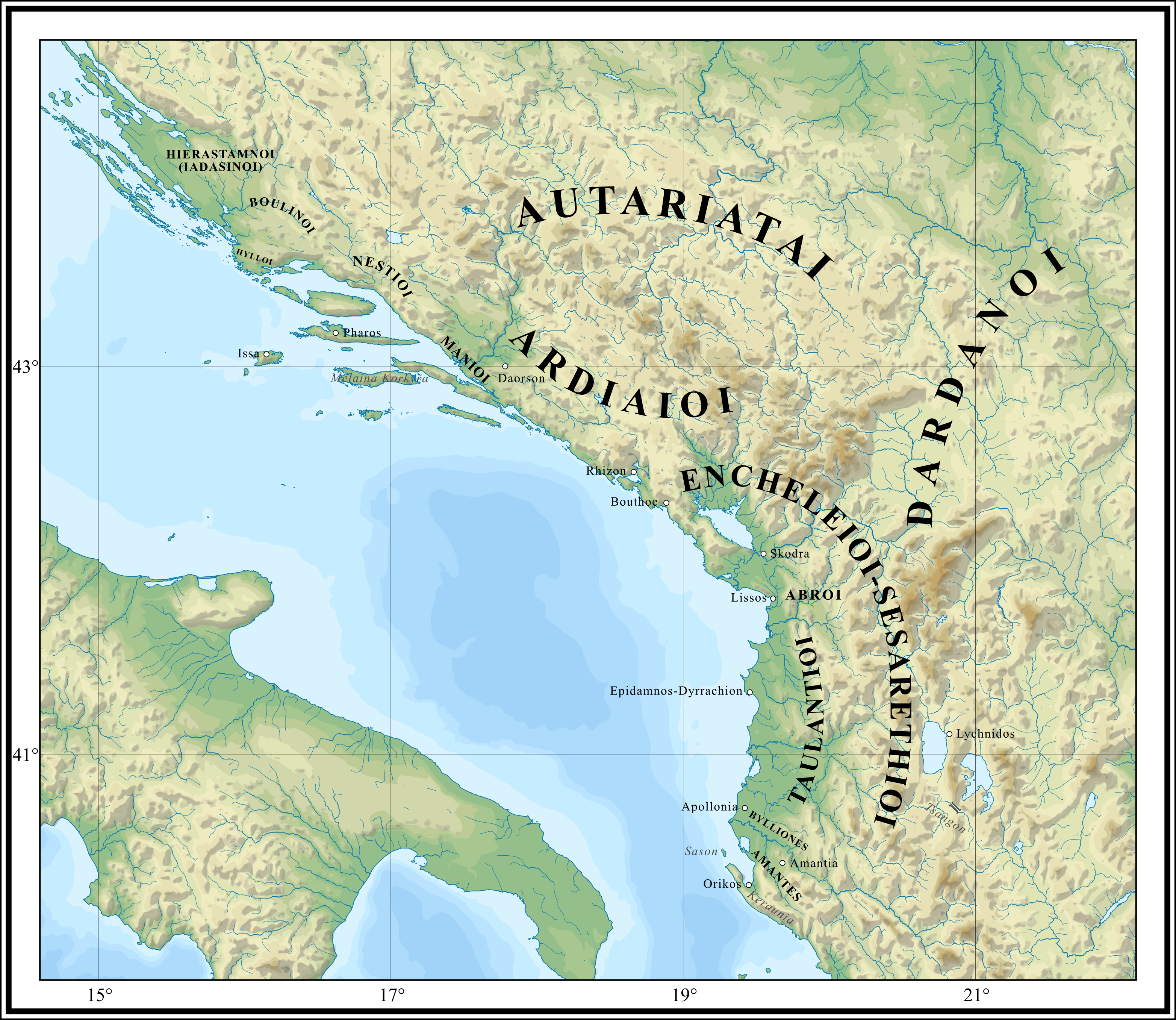
Illyrian tribes in the 7th–4th centuries BCE.

The Autariatan communities unified into a single political entity that can be called with the collective name Autariatae in the period 6th – 4th centuries BC. They began to expand eastward into territories controlled by the Triballi. Moreover, they expanded southward where they defeated the Ardiaei, their old rivals, in struggles for control over pastures and salty springs. Activities of the Autariatae at the turn of the 6th and 5th centuries BC profoundly influenced the peoples who were directly affected by their expansion. The Ardiaei were moved toward the coasts and the Triballi to the east. The expansion of the Autariatae enabled them to achieve hegemonic control over one part of the interior of the Balkan Peninsula. The leading class of the Autariatae society reached the peak of its political and economic development indicated through many great luxurious royal tumuli and graves created during the 5th century BC. Strabo’s comment on the Autariatae as "the once greatest and most powerful Illyrian people" most likely refers to this period. Their peak of development was followed by the gradual decline of the Autariatae ending in 310 BC with their sudden disappearance due to Celtic migrations.

As reported by ancient historian Arrian, the Autariatae were one of the three Illyrian tribes that made war against Alexander the Great during his 335 BC campaign. Although modern historians usually assume that the Autariatae and the southern Illyrians were undertaking a joint attack against the Macedonians, it is not explicitly stated by Arrian. Arrian reports that Alexander received news of a revolt undertaken by the Illyrian chieftain Cleitus, aided by Glaukias, king of the Taulantii, while the Autariatae were preparing to ambush the main force of Macedon during Alexander's absence. Macedonian ally Langarus, king of the Agrianes, with Alexander's approval invaded the territory of Autariatae preventing their attack to Macedon. Alexander did not wait the end of Langarus' conflict, but instead quickly moved southward. Langarus took by surprise the Autariatae and plundered their land. After his victory, Langarus returned to his kingdom with rich spoils. According to a modern interpretation, Arrian's account concerning Autariatae's aim to attack Macedonia was likely introduced into writing as a pretext to justify Langaru's raid against Autariatae. The Agrianian king's demand to raid and pillage the Autariatae would have been granted by Alexander because the Macedonian king considered him a trustworthy ally. Arrian mentions in his accounts that the Autariate were a tribe without a king. He also states that Langarus described them as "the least warlike" people, on the other hand this statement is contradicted by Strabo's accounts, which describe the Autariatae as an expanding tribe of conquerors.

Appian (95 – 165) writes that the Ardiaei were destroyed by the Autariatae and that in contrast to the Autariatae had maritime power. He also reports that the Autariatae were punished by Apollo for raiding the Pythian Oracle together with the Celtic Cimbri, after which moment they migrated to the lands of the Getae near the tribe of Bastarnae. This could be an explanation why the Autariatae "disappear" after 310 B.C., according to Wilkes. The ancient geographer, Strabo, lists the Autariatae as one of the three strongest tribes - the other two being the Ardiaei and the Dardanii.

The Autariatae and the Celtic Scordisci are thought to have merged into one tribe in the Lower Morava valley, after 313 BC, since excavations show that the two groups made burials at the same exact grave field in Pecine, near Kostolac. Nine graves of Autariatae dating to 4th century BC and scattered Autariatae and Celtic graves around these earlier graves show that the two groups mixed rather than made war and this resulted in the lower Morava valley becoming a Celto-Thraco-Illyrian interaction zone.

== Culture ==
A standard practice of the Autariatae entailed killing their weak and wounded. This was meant to prevent meek individuals from falling into the hands of their enemies. This practice perhaps was motivated by the superstitious belief that the enemy, by drinking the blood of prisoners and by eating parts of their bodies containing their virtues, would become even stronger and acquire a special power over the entire community of the Autariatae.

The Autariatae left a legacy of material wealth. So far, more than 100 castle ruins were identified to have been inhabited by the Autariatae, as well as thousands of tumuli in which they had been buried. Movable materials (mostly jewelry and weapons) reveal all specific features associated with the ethno-cultural originality of the Autariatae. The Autariatae established a continuous tradition of manufacturing metal and ceramic products. Artifacts consisting of metal sheets with luxurious golden and silver belts of Mramorac type indicate the complexity of this tradition.

The Autariatae are a classic example of a "highland" people who also show all the characteristics of a "highland" mentality (i.e. preservation of old beliefs). Case in point, the Autariatae have strongly maintained their burial customs of burning the dead in tumuli, which did not change until the end of the Glasinac culture. Archaeological remains indicate that the religious life of the Autariatae was influenced by both their ancestor cult and the cult of their solar god. One can find the numerous evidence of the solar cult throughout the territories once controlled by the Autariatae. The Autariatae economy was based on cattle breeding, metalwork, handicraft and trade. Because of its need for Greek and Italic goods, this Illyrian tribe was one of the biggest trade partners of the western and central Balkans to both Greek and Italic traders between the 7th and 6th centuries BC.

== See also ==
- List of ancient Illyrian peoples and tribes
- List of ancient tribes in Illyria

== Bibliography ==
- Bearzot, Cinzia (2004). "Celti in Illiria. A proposito del frg. 40 di Teopompo". In Urso, Gianpaolo (ed.). Dall'Adriatico al Danubio: l'Illirico nell'età greca e romana : atti del convegno internazionale, Cividale del Friuli, 25-27 settembre 2003. I convegni della Fondazione Niccolò Canussio (in Italian). ETS. pp. 63–78. ISBN 884671069X.
- Hammond, Nicholas Geoffrey Lemprière (1966). "The Kingdoms in Illyria circa 400-167 B.C.". The Annual of the British School at Athens. 61. British School at Athens: 239–253. doi:10.1017/S0068245400019043. JSTOR 30103175. S2CID 164155370.
- Mesihović, Salmedin (2014). ΙΛΛΥΡΙΚΗ (Ilirike) (in Bosnian). Sarajevo: Filozofski fakultet u Sarajevu. ISBN 978-9958-0311-0-6.
- Mesihović, Salmedin; Šačić, Amra (2015). Historija Ilira [History of Illyrians] (in Bosnian). Sarajevo: Univerzitet u Sarajevu [University of Sarajevo]. ISBN 978-9958-600-65-4.
- Papazoglu, Fanula (1978). The Central Balkan Tribes in pre-Roman Times: Triballi, Autariatae, Dardanians, Scordisci and Moesians. Amsterdam: Hakkert. ISBN 9789025607937.
- Šašel Kos, Marjeta (2013). "The 'great lake' and the Autariatai in Pseudo-Skylax". Mélanges de l'École française de Rome: Antiquité. 125 (1): 247–257. doi:10.4000/mefra.1376.
- Vujčić, Nemanja (2021). "The City of Pelion and the Illyrian War of Alexander". Greek, Roman, and Byzantine Studies. 61.
- Wilkes, John J. (1992). The Illyrians. Oxford, United Kingdom: Blackwell Publishing. ISBN 0-631-19807-5.
- Yardley, J. C.; Wheatley, Pat; Heckel, Waldemar (2011). Justin: Epitome of the Philippic History of Pompeius Trogus: Volume II: Books 13-15: The Successors to Alexander the Great. Clarendon Press. ISBN 978-0199277599.
