= Langarus =

Ancient Agrianian king

Langarus (Greek: Λάγγαρος; died 335 BC), king of the Agrianians, was a contemporary of Alexander the Great (336–323 BC), with whom he ingratiated himself even before the death of Philip II, previous king of Macedon. Langarus rendered Alexander important services during Alexander's expedition against the Illyrians and Taulantians shortly after his accession, when the Autariatae were preparing to attack him on his march. Langarus invaded their territory, preventing them from carrying their purpose into effect. Alexander conferred on him the most distinguished marks of his favour and promised him his half-sister Cynane in marriage, but Langarus died soon after his return home.
