= Bardylis =

Illyrian king from 393 BC to 358 BC

- Reign: 393–358 BC
- Successor: Cleitus
- Born: c. 448 BC; Dardania or Enchelei regional tribes
- Died: c. 358 BC (aged 90); Erigon Valley
- Issue: Cleitus and possibly Audata
- Dynasty: Bardylis dynasty
- Religion: Illyrian paganism

Bardylis or Bardyllis (/bɑːrˈdɪlɪs/; Ancient Greek: Βάρδυλις; c. 448–358 BC) was an Illyrian king, and the founder of the first attested Illyrian dynasty. During his reign, Bardylis aimed to make Illyria a regional power interfering with Macedon. He united many southern Illyrian tribes under his realm and defeated the Macedonians and Molossians several times, expanding his dominion over upper Macedonia, including Lynkestis, and ruling over Macedon through a puppet king. Before the rise of Macedon, Illyrians were the dominant power in the region. Bardylis also led raids against Epirus, but his soldiers were eventually expelled from the region.

Most scholars hold that the Illyrian kingdom that was established by Bardylis was centered along Lake Ohrid and east to the Prespa Lakes, which was called Dassaretis later in Roman times, located on the border between Macedon and Epirus. (Note: There is also another historical reconstruction that considers Bardylis a Dardanian ruler, who during the expansion of his dominion included the region of Dassaretis in his realm, but this is considered an old fallacy because it is unsupported by any ancient source, while some facts and ancient geographical locations go squarely against it.) Illyrians, in particular under Bardylis' leadership, held a remarkable role in the development of the Argead Macedonian military. Philip II and Alexander the Great spent at least some of their youth age at Illyrian courts, getting well familiar with Illyrian customs, habits and specially military strategies and techniques.

According to ancient sources, Bardylis lived to over 90 years. According to these sources, Bardylis lived a long time and was at an advanced age when he faced Philip II of Macedon in 358 BC and at whose hands he died after Philip rejected his offer of peace based on Bardylis retaining conquered lands. Bardylis' son Cleitus revolted with the help of Taulantian king Glaukias against Alexander the Great in the siege of Pelium undertaken in 335 BC.

== Name ==
Messapic inscription "BARZIDIHI", a name with the same root as the name of the Illyrian king (spelled in Ancient Greek as ΒΑΡΔΥΛΙΣ) as well as the Albanian name Bardh-i. Settled in Salento, Messapians spoke a Palaeo-Balkan language closely related to Albanian and/or Illyrian, and they used the letter 𐌆 to transcribe the sound [dz]/[dž] of their own language, while Ancient Greek and Roman authors were unfamiliar in transcribing the affricates of Albanoid in the Balkans, hence they used the letter Δ/D for the name of the Illyrian king.

The name Bardylis/Bardulis contains the same root as the Albanian adjective i bardhë "white", ultimately from Proto-Indo-European *bʰór(h₁)ǵos < *bʰreh₁ǵ- ("to gleam, shine"). The same root is found in the Messapic names Barzidihi, Barduli and Barletta.

The name Bardylis/Bardulis, spelled in Ancient Greek as ΒΑΡΔΥΛΙΣ, is among those Illyrian names that featured Albanoid affricates, which were not familiar to Ancient Greek and Roman authors, who transcribed them with alternating spellings using dentals and sibilants, and in particular they used Δ/D for the Illyrian king's name.

== Biography ==
=== Reign ===
Bardylis was born around the year 448 BC. Bardylis became king despite his humble roots. A charcoal-burner and coal miner, he gained power by force and enjoyed the sympathy of the Illyrian warriors because he divided the spoils of war fairly and impartially. Bardylis did not succeed Sirras, but rather the previous Illyrian king who had entered into a peace treaty with Amyntas II over the control of Lynkestis. Bardylis succeeded in bringing the various Illyrian tribes together and soon made his kingdom a formidable power in the Balkans, resulting in a change in relations with Macedon.

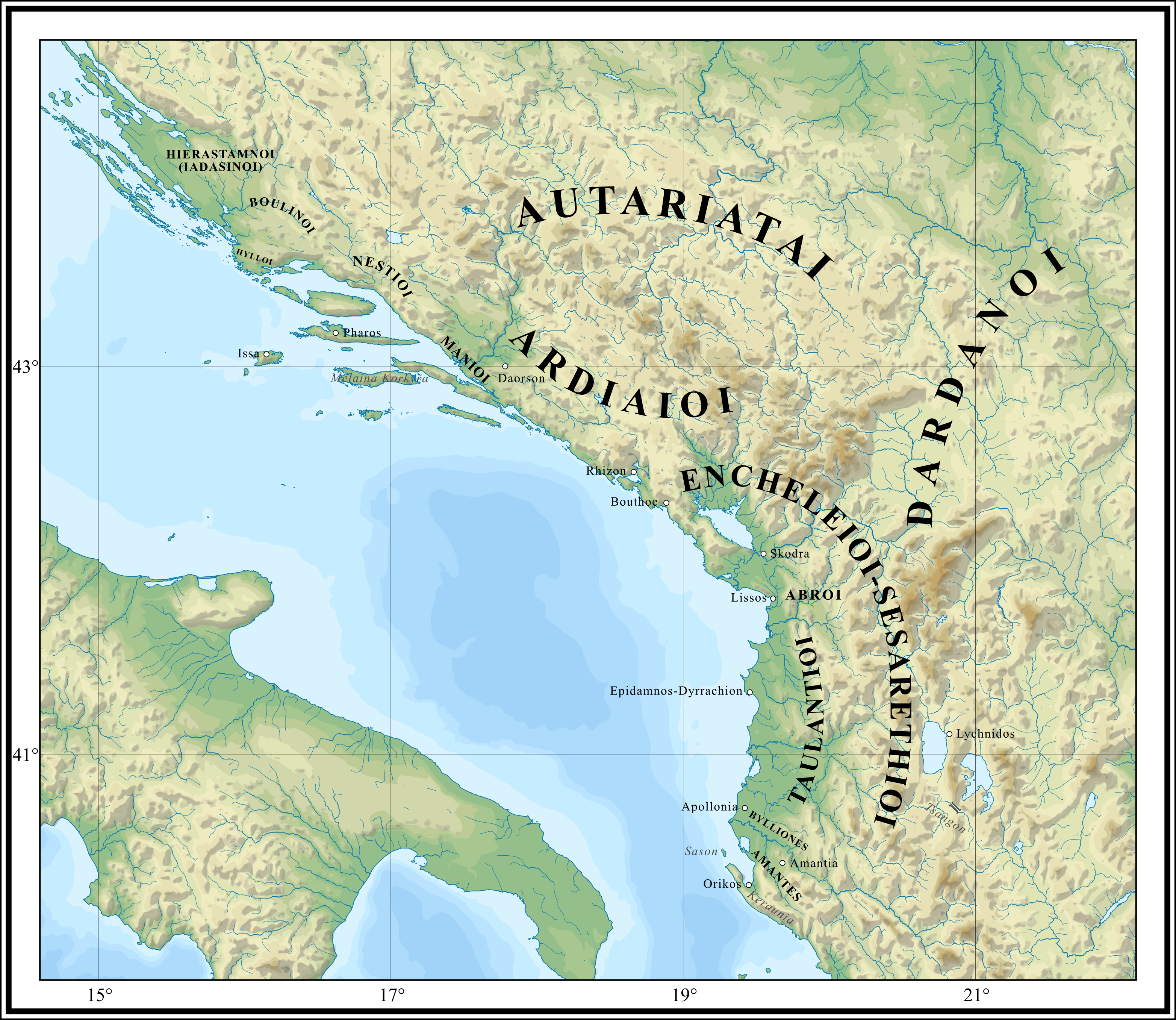
Illyrian tribes in the 7th–4th centuries BCE.

No ancient sources identify Bardylis with any tribe or regime other than Illyrians and nothing is recorded about the center of his power, except that Philip's victory against him in 358 BC gained control of Lyncestis and the territory as far as Lake Ohrid. According to a historical reconstruction, Bardylis founded a powerful Illyrian dynasty among the Dassaretii in the 5th century BC, and established a realm centered in their territory that comprised the area along Lychnidus and east to the Prespa Lakes, which was called "Dassaretis" later in Roman times. A fragment of Callisthenes (c. 360 – 327 BC) which places Bardylis' realm between Molossis and Macedonia, well determines the position of that Illyrian kingdom in the area of Dassaretis. Bardylis' expansion in Upper Macedonia and Molossis, and his son Cleitus' revolt at Pelion in Dassaretis against Alexander the Great make this localization of the core of their realm even more plausible. There is also another historical reconstruction that considers Bardylis a Dardanian ruler, who during the expansion of his dominion included the region of Dassaretis in his realm, but this is considered an old fallacy because it is unsupported by any ancient source, while some facts and ancient geographical locations go squarely against it. The exact extension of the kingdom of Bardylis and Cleitus is not known, as it could have included other regions besides Dassaretis.

Bardylis, unlike previous Illyrian kings, developed both the military and economic aspects of his state. His subjects, the Damastini, began to issue fine silver coins from c. 395 BC in the Illyrian city of Damastion. These coins adopted a version of the standard coins and some emblems of the then powerful Chalcidian League. They also exported silver in ingot form. Other coins were issued from around 365 BC in Daparria, a mining city in what is now Kosovo which used the same standard and types as the coinage of the Damastini. The distribution of the coins suggest that Bardylis built up trade within the central Balkans and northwards to the Danube, which was far from the areas dominated by the Greek traders. Dionysius of Syracuse tried to take advantage of Bardylis's growing trade when he established colonies in the Adriatic. It is probable that Bardylis, unlike previous Illyrian kings, built a few fortified cities, for Lychnidus and Pelion in Lynkestis were walled sites probably before the accession of Philip.

Bardylis was an ambitious Illyrian ruler, who (according to Tertullian) after seeing a sign in a dream, embarked on a series of military victories which allowed him to extend Illyrian rule over the Molossians and other regional tribes, as far as the frontiers of Macedon.

=== Macedonian campaigns ===
It seems that Bardylis opposed the agreement between Amyntas III and Sirras and invaded Macedon in 393 BC. Bardylis used new warfare tactics never before used by any of the Illyrians. He won a decisive battle against Amyntas III, expelled him, and ruled Macedon through a puppet king. In 392 BC, Amyntas III allied himself with the Thessalians and was able to bring Macedon back under his rule from the Illyrians. However, the Illyrians were constantly raiding the northern frontiers of Macedon. After continuous invasions, Bardylis was able to force Macedon to pay him an annual tribute in 372 BC.

In 370 BC, the Macedonian king Amyntas III died, having restored the fortunes of his kingdom after the Illyrian disasters from earlier in his reign. His marriage to Eurydice, daughter of Lyncestian prince Sirras produced three sons and a daughter. His eldest son was Alexander II. In 369 BC, Bardylis prevented Alexander II from eliminating the Illyrians from Macedonia. After the battle, Bardylis was said to have briefly held Philip II, the youngest brother of Alexander II, as a hostage. In 368 BC, Alexander II was succeeded by his brother Perdiccas III.

The Paeonians began a series of raids against the Macedonians in support of a Illyrian invasion from the north. Perdiccas III, king of Macedonia, humiliated by the indignity of having to pay tribute to the Illyrians, marched north in the spring of 359 BC with the Macedonian army to resolve the issue by battle. This was not the first occasion in which he had fought against Bardylis, but the Macedonians lost the battle. The king himself was among the 4,000 Macedonians dead. The remainder, panic-stricken after having become exceedingly afraid of the Illyrian army, lost heart for continuing the war. This was the worst loss suffered by the Macedonians in their efforts to free themselves from the Illyrian invaders. The Illyrians followed up their victory by expanding their control southward to Lake Lychnitis (Lake Ohrid) and westward into Upper Macedonia. Through the actions of Bardylis, the Illyrians had brought Macedon close to collapse.

When Philip II, the youngest of the three brothers assumed the throne, he was determined to subdue the Illyrians under Bardylis once and for all, and thus destroy the Illyrian menace.

=== Raid on Epirus ===
In 385 BC, the Illyrians, who at that time were under Bardylis' rule, formed an alliance with the powerful tyrant Dionysius of Syracuse. The purpose of the agreement was the restoration to the throne of the Molossian Alcetas which laterly was restored as King of Molossians, who had become a refugee living at the court of Dionysius. Both sides were interested in the benefits of such an alliance as it would secure Illyrian power and weaken the influence of the Spartans and Macedonians in Epirus. This would also give Dionysius an opportunity to strengthen trade opportunities along the shores of the Adriatic and Ionian seas.

Dionysius sent 2,000 men and 5,000 weapons to the Illyrians who were prepared to go to war. With these new supplies, Bardylis and his army invaded Epirus and slaughtered 15,000 Molossians. However, this action came to naught after the Spartans under Agesilaus intervened and expelled the Illyrians from the region.

In 360 BC, another Illyrian attack forced the Molossian king Arymbas to evacuate his non-combatant population to Aetolia and he let the Illyrians loot the region again. The stratagem worked and the Molossians fell upon the Illyrians who were encumbered with booty and defeated them. In the same year Arymbas also defeated the Illyrians after they raided and looted Epirus.

=== Battle of Erigon Valley ===
In 359 BC, Macedon was able to return to the field of battle against the Illyrians, after it had overcome the internal state of political chaos and removed the risk of attack from other opponents. When Philip II assumed the Macedonian throne, substantial areas of upper Macedonia remained under the control of Bardylis. In order to concentrate on the internal struggle necessary to secure his crown, Philip reaffirmed the treaty the Illyrians had imposed on Macedonia by force of arms and sealed the alliance by his marriage to Audata, great-granddaughter of Bardylis. This action undoubtedly deterred a full-scale Illyrian invasion of Macedon at a time when the country was most vulnerable.

By the spring of 358 BC, Philip had at last secured his throne and was now able to address the occupation of north-west Macedon by Bardylis. When word of the mobilization of the Macedonian army came to Bardylis's attention, he proposed to Philip that they sign a treaty to maintain the status quo, provided that both parties maintain the cities that were already in their possession at the time. This was, of course, unacceptable to Philip because he was not prepared to accept any terms other than a full Illyrian withdrawal from north-west Macedonia. Bardylis, however, was not inclined to give up his gains without a fight. Philip mobilized every able-bodied soldier in Macedon for the battle. Bardylis, as before, was not likely to take any prisoners, so any Macedonian defeat would result in crippling casualties.

Although the two armies were almost equal in numbers – Bardylis's 500 cavalry and 10,000 infantry against Philip's force of 600 cavalry and 10,000 infantry – the Macedonians were far better trained and equipped. The armies met in battle on a plain in the Erigon Valley near Bitola, just south-east of Illyria. Bardylis initially deployed in a linear formation with his strongest troops in the centre, similar to the phalanx formation. Philip concentrated his best troops, the hypaspists, on his right flank. As Philip advanced to engage Bardylis, his cavalry turned one or two of Bardylis' flanks, forcing him to redeploy into a defensive square formation. The Illyrians for quite some time withstood the assaults of the enemy. At first neither party had control of the battlefield, and so the battle continued for a long time. Eventually Philip's hypaspists succeeded in penetrating the right corner of the Illyrian forces, which other Macedonian troops were able to widen. This threw Bardylis's entire formation into disorder, after which it was quickly broken by the phalanx and routed from the battlefield.

Thus Philip II of Macedon was able to defeat Bardylis. Diodorus Siculus (1st century BC) writes of the event:

And at first for a long while the battle was evenly poised because of the exceeding gallantry displayed on both sides, and as many were slain and still more wounded, the fortune of battle vacillated first one way then the other, being constantly swayed by the valorous deeds of the combatants; but later as the horsemen pressed on from the flank and rear and Philip with the flower of his troops fought with true heroism, the mass of the Illyrians was compelled to take hastily to flight.When the pursuit had been kept up for a considerable distance and many had been slain in their flight, Philip recalled the Macedonians with the trumpet and erecting a trophy of victory buried his own dead, while the Illyrians, having sent ambassadors and withdrawn from all the Macedonian cities, obtained peace. But more than seven thousand Illyrians were slain in this battle.

The battle had cost the Illyrian 7,000 casualties, almost three quarters of their initial army. Bardylis himself was probably killed in this battle as he rode on horseback at the advanced age of 90. Although the Macedonians finally won the battle, Philip II saw that he was not able to follow the enemy and chase them. The Illyrians later sent representatives and settled terms for peace, releasing all the cities they had conquered from Macedonia. In this battle, the troubling issue of Lynkestis was resolved, changing the situation in the western borders in favour of Macedonia. Philip secured Macedon's north-west frontier by annexing Illyrian territory as far as Lake Lynkcesta (Lake Ohrid). This would form a defensive buffer against any future Illyrian raids attempted through the Drilon Valley. The borders between the Illyrian and the Macedonians remained around Lake Ohrid for a long time.

== Family ==
Bardylis had a son named Cleitus. Cleitus' son was presumably Bardylis II. The Illyrian princess Bircenna, who married the Molossian king Pyrrhus of Epirus (c. 290 BC), was the daughter of Bardylis II. Bardylis' daughter or granddaughter Audata married Philip II of Macedon.

== See also ==
- List of rulers of Illyria

== Bibliography ==
- Ashley, James R. (2004). The Macedonian Empire: The Era of Warfare Under Philip II and Alexander the Great, 359-323 B.C. McFarland. ISBN 978-0-7864-1918-0.
- Bejko, Lorenc, ed. (2004). Die Illyrer: Katalog zu einer Ausstellung von archäologischen Funden der albanischen Eisenzeit (12.-4. Jh. v. Chr.) aus den Sammlungen des Archäologischen Institutes der Albanischen Akademie der Wissenschaften in Tirana und des Archäologischen Museums in Durres, Albanien; Sonderausstellung im Museum für Urgeschichte des Landes Niederösterreich, Asparn an der Zaya, vom 3. April bis 30. November 2004. Amt der Niederösterreichischen Landesregierung, Abteilung Kultur und Wissenschaft. ISBN 9783854602156.
- Borza, Eugene N. (1990). In the Shadow of Olympus: The Emergence of Macedon. ISBN 0-691-00880-9.
- Cabanes, Pierre (2002) [1988]. Dinko Čutura; Bruna Kuntić-Makvić (eds.). Iliri od Bardileja do Gencia (IV. – II. stoljeće prije Krista) [The Illyrians from Bardylis to Gentius (4th – 2nd century BC)] (in Croatian). Translated by Vesna Lisičić. Svitava. ISBN 953-98832-0-2.
- Carney, Elizabeth Donnelly (2000). Women and Monarchy in Macedonia. Oklahoma Series in Classical Culture. University of Oklahoma Press. ISBN 978-0-8061-3212-9.
- Castiglioni, Maria Paola (2007). "Genealogical Myth and Political Propaganda in Antiquity: the Re-Use of Greek Myths from Dionysius to Augustus". In Carvalho, Joaquim (ed.). Religion and Power in Europe: Conflict and Convergence. Edizioni Plus. ISBN 978-88-8492-464-3.
- Castiglioni, Maria Paola (2010). Cadmos-serpent en Illyrie: itinéraire d'un héros civilisateur. Edizioni Plus. ISBN 9788884927422.
- Crăciun, Radu (2023). "Diellina, një bimë trako-dake me emër proto-albanoid" [Diellina, a Thracian-Dacian plant with a Proto-Albanoid name]. Studime Filologjike (1–2). Centre of Albanological Studies: 77–83. doi:10.62006/sf.v1i1-2.3089. ISSN 0563-5780.
- Demiraj, Bardhyl (1997). Albanische Etymologien: Untersuchungen zum albanischen Erbwortschatz. Leiden Studies in Indo-European (in German). Vol. 7. Amsterdam, Atlanta: Rodopi. ISBN 9789042001619.
- Hammond, N. G. L. (1967). Epirus: the Geography, the Ancient Remains, the History and Topography of Epirus and Adjacent Areas. Clarendon Press. ISBN 0198142536.
- Hammond, N. G. L. (1986). A History of Greece to 322 B.C. p. 470. ISBN 0-19-873095-0.
- Hammond, Nicholas Geoffrey Lemprière (1994). "Illyrians and North-West Greeks". In Lewis, David Malcolm; Boardman, John; Hornblower, Simon; Ostwald, M. (eds.). The Cambridge Ancient History: The Fourth Century B.C. Vol. VI. Cambridge: Cambridge University Press. pp. 422–443. ISBN 0-521-23348-8.
- Hammond, N. G. L. (1998). The Genius of Alexander the Great. University of North Carolina Press. ISBN 978-0-8078-4744-2.
- Howe, T. (2017). "Plain tales from the hills: Illyrian influences on Argead military development". In Müller, S.; Howe, Tim; Bowden, H.; Rollinger, R. (eds.). The History of the Argeads: New Perspectives. Wiesbaden. ISBN 978-3447108515.
- Ivić, Pavle (1987). Recueil de la Sixième Conférence yougoslave d'onomastique. Srpska akademija nauka i umetnosti. ISBN 9788670250758.
- Jaupaj, Lavdosh (2019). Etudes des interactions culturelles en aire Illyro-épirote du VII au III siècle av. J.-C (Thesis). Université de Lyon; Instituti i Arkeologjisë (Albanie).
- King, Carol J. (2017). Ancient Macedonia. Routledge. ISBN 9780415827287.
- Lane Fox, R. (2011). "Philip of Macedon: Accession, Ambitions, and Self-Presentation". In Lane Fox, R. (ed.). Brill's Companion to Ancient Macedon: Studies in the Archaeology and History of Macedon, 650 BC – 300 AD. Leiden: Brill. pp. 335–366. ISBN 978-90-04-20650-2.
- Malkin, Irad (1998). The Returns of Odysseus: Colonization and Ethnicity. Berkeley: University of California Press. ISBN 9780520920262.
- Mann, Stuart Edward (1977). An Albanian Historical Grammar. Buske. ISBN 978-3-87118-262-4.
- Mesihović, Salmedin; Šačić, Amra (2015). Historija Ilira [History of Illyrians] (in Bosnian). Sarajevo: Univerzitet u Sarajevu [University of Sarajevo]. ISBN 978-9958-600-65-4.
- Mortensen, Kate (1991). "The Career of Bardylis". The Ancient World. Vol. 22. Ares Publishers. pp. 49–59.
- Parisot, Pierrick (2015). Le contrôle de l'espace européen par les rois de Macédoine, des origines à la fin de la monarchie (VIe siècle av. J.-C.–168 av. J.-C.) (Thesis) (in French). Université de Lorraine.
- Rosetti, Alexandru (1973). Brève histoire de la langue roumaine des origines à nos jours. Mouton.
- Šašel Kos, Marjeta (2002). "Pyrrhus and Illyrian Kingdom(s?)". Greek Influence Along the East Adriatic Coast. Knjiga Mediterana. 26: 101–119. ISBN 9531631549.
- Shehi, Eduard (2023). "Archaic, Classical, and Roman Pottery". In Galaty, Michael L.; Bejko, Lorenc (eds.). Archaeological Investigations in a Northern Albanian Province: Results of the Projekti Arkeologjik i Shkodrës (PASH): Volume Two: Artifacts and Artifact Analysis. Memoirs Series. Vol. 64. University of Michigan Press. ISBN 9781951538699.
- Stipčević, Aleksandar (1977). The Illyrians: history and culture. Noyes Press. ISBN 978-0-8155-5052-5.
- Toynbee, Arnold Joseph (1969). Some problems of Greek history. Oxford University Press. ISBN 9780192152497.
- Vujčić, Nemanja (2021). "The City of Pelion and the Illyrian War of Alexander". Greek, Roman, and Byzantine Studies. 61.
- Wilkes, John J. (1996) [1992]. The Illyrians. Oxford, United Kingdom: Blackwell Publishers Limited. ISBN 0-631-19807-5.
- Woodward, B. B. (1993). Encyclopedia of Great Events, Places and Personalities. ISBN 81-85066-57-4.
