= Taulantii =

Illyrian people

Taulantii or Taulantians ('swallow-men'; Ancient Greek: Ταυλάντιοι, Taulantioi or Χελιδόνιοι, Chelidonioi; Latin: Taulantii) were an Illyrian people that lived on the Adriatic coast of southern Illyria (modern Albania). They dominated at various times much of the plain between the rivers Drin (Drilon) and Vjosa (Aoös). Their central area was the hinterland of Epidamnos-Dyrrhachion, corresponding to present-day Durrës and the region between the valleys of Mat and Shkumbin (Genusus). The Taulantii are among the oldest attested Illyrian peoples, who established a powerful kingdom in southern Illyria. They are among the peoples who most marked Illyrian history, and thus found their place in the numerous works of historians in classical antiquity.

== Name ==
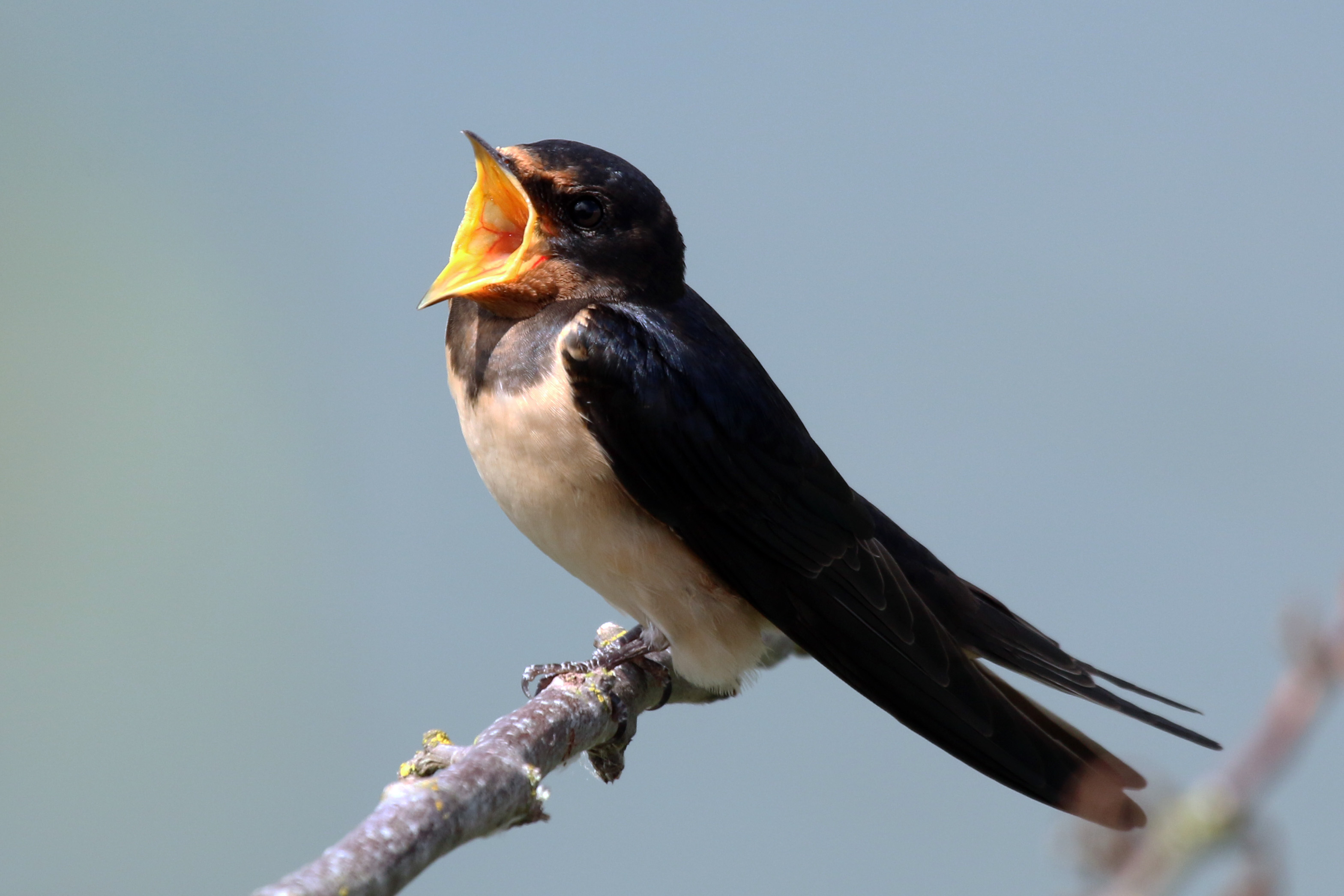
The Illyrian taulánt- and its Ancient Greek translation chelidón- mean "swallow".

The term taulantii is connected with the Albanian word dallëndyshe, meaning 'swallow'. The ethnonym Chelidonioi also reported by Hecataeus of Miletus as the name of a tribe neighboring the Taulantii is the translation of the name Taulantii as khelīdṓn (χελιδών) means "swallow" in Ancient Greek. The name suggests the practice of animal totemism, which was widespread among Illyrian peoples.

The Taulantii, along with the Eneti, are the oldest attested peoples expressly considered Illyrian in early Greek historiography. The Taulantii were firstly recorded by ancient Greek writer Hecataeus of Miletus in the 6th century BC. The Taulantii are often reported in the works of ancient writers describing the numerous wars they waged against the Macedonians, the Epirotes, and the ancient Greek colonies on the Illyrian coast. They are mentioned, for instance, by Thucydides, Polybius, Diodorus Siculus, Titus Livius, Pliny the Elder and Appian.

Hecataeus reported that the tribe of Chelidonioi (Χελιδόνιοι) lived to the north of the Sesarethioi (Σεσαρήθιοι). Furthermore, he reported that Sesarethos (Σεσάρηθος) was a Taulantian city, with Sesarethioi as its ethnicon. It has been suggested either that the name Chelidonioi might have been an exonym, and that Hecataeus wrongly differentiated two tribes misjudging the meaning of the name, or that after the name of the local tribe was translated from Illyrian by Greek colonists in Epidamnos, the ethnonym Chelidones might have adhered to the Taulantian people located in Epidamnos, while the ethnonym Taulantii continued to be used as the name of the neighboring Taulantian people.

According to a mythological tradition reported by Appian (2nd century AD), the Taulantii were among the South-Illyrian tribes that took their names from the first generation of the descendants of Illyrius, the eponymous ancestor of all the Illyrian peoples.

== Geography ==
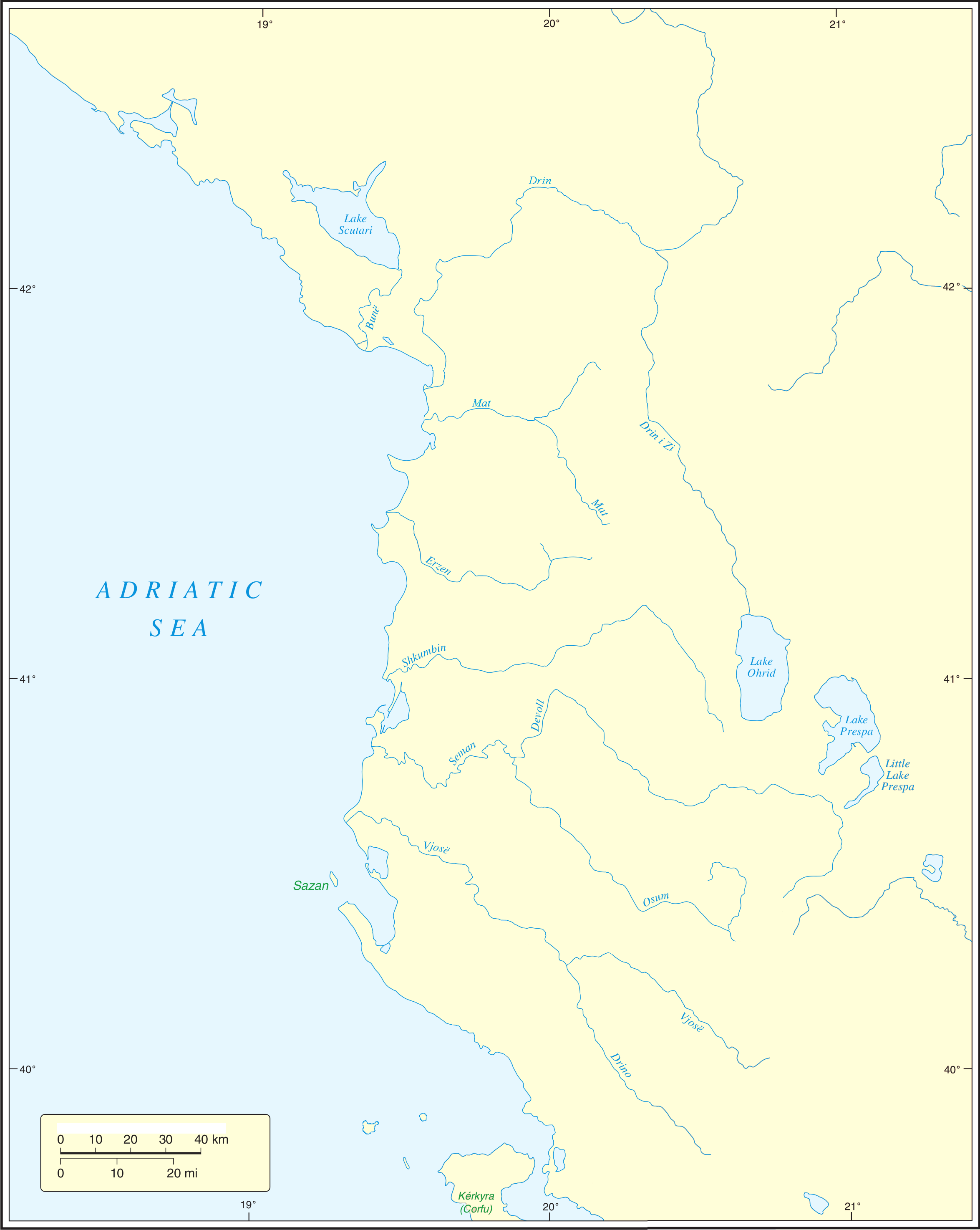

The Taulantii lived on the southeastern Adriatic coast of southern Illyria and the Ionian Sea (modern Albania), dominating at various times much of the plain between the rivers Drin and Aous. In earlier times the Taulantii inhabited the northern part of the Drin river; later they lived within and around the sites of Epidamnos-Dyrrhachion and Apollonia. Their territory was centered in the area of present-day Durrës, and its hinterland between the valleys of the Mat and Shkumbin rivers. In Roman times, their neighbours to the north were the Labeatae, to the east the Parthini, and to the south-east the Bylliones. The Parthini probably have been part of the Taulantian peoples before their first appearance as Roman allies in the late 3rd century BC, neighboring to the east the Dassareti, and to the north-east the Penestae. The Abri or Abroi, a tribe mentioned by Hecataeus (6th century BC) as neighbors of the Chelidonioi likely also have been part of the Taulantian peoples.

The extension of the Taulantii to the limits of the Apollonian territory is not very clear in the data provided by Pseudo-Skylax. The southern border of the Taulantii was likely the Vjosa while the northern border was marked by the Mat river. Livy and Pliny located them in the same place, but according to Ptolemy, Aulon (Vlorë) was in Taulantian territory, which implies an extension of this people towards the south including the territory of Apollonia. In Roman times such a southward extension was not possible before the end of the Roman civil wars, which involved this area.

== History ==
=== Early Iron Age ===
The Taulantii are one of the most anciently known Illyrian group of tribes. Taulantian settlement at the site of Epidamnos-Dyrrhachion (Durrës) is estimated to have happened not later than the 10th century BC. After their occupation of the site, Illyrian tribes most likely left the eastern coast of the Adriatic for Italy departing from the region of Epidamnos-Dyrrhachion for the best crossing to Bari, in Apulia. When they settled in the area of Epidamnos-Dyrrhachion, it seems that the Taulantii replaced the previous inhabitants, the Bryges. According to another ancient tradition the Taulantii replaced the Parthini, who were pushed more inland losing their coastal holdings.

=== Archaic period ===
About the 9th century BC, the Liburni expanded their dominion southwards, taking possession of the site of Epidamnos-Dyrrhachion and expelling the Taulantii. In that period, the Taulantii expanded southwards and controlled the plain of Mallakastër, reaching as far as the mouth of the Aous.

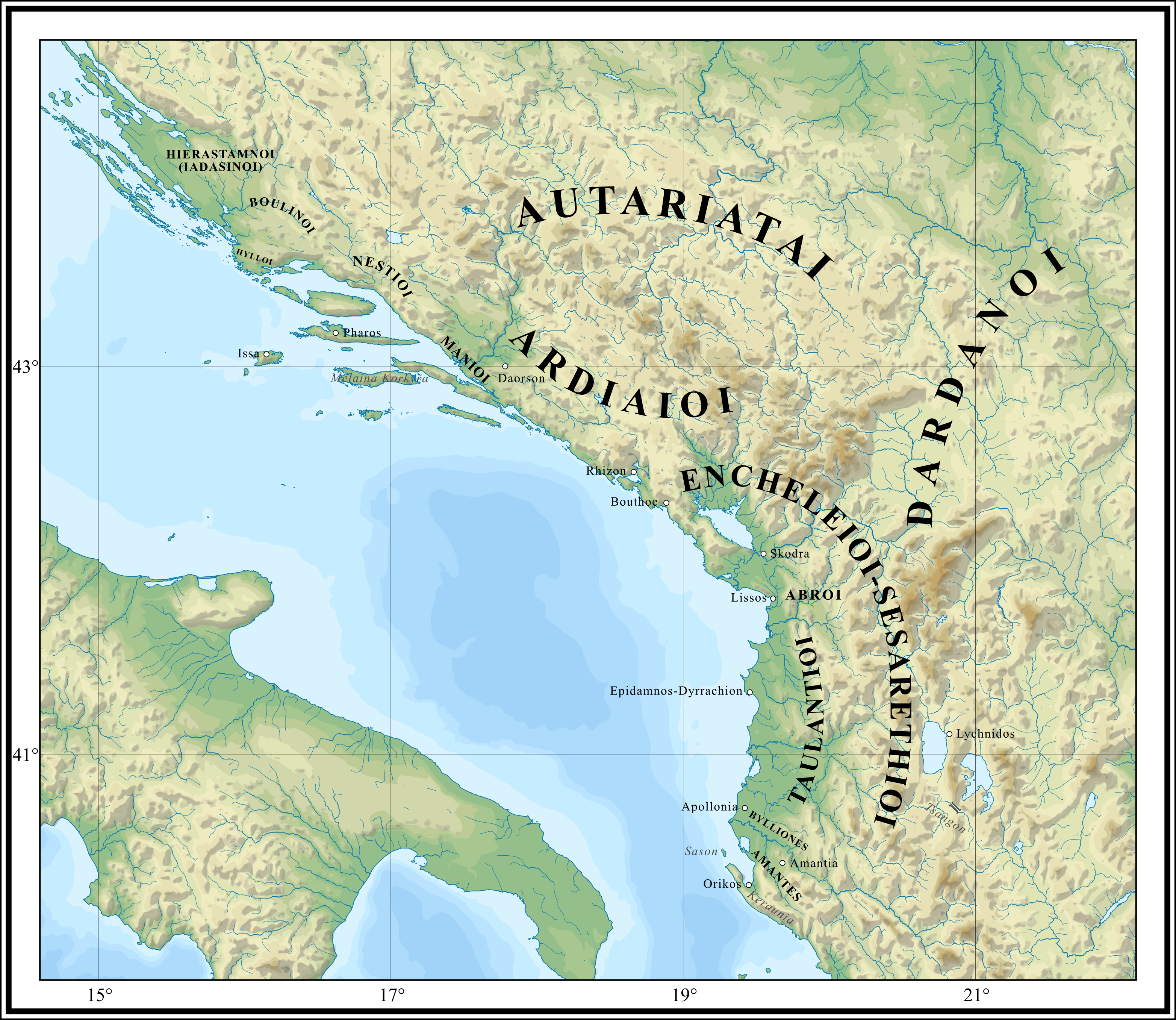
Illyrian tribes in the 7th–4th centuries BCE.

When describing the Illyrian invasion of Macedonia ruled by Argaeus I, somewhere between 678–640 BC, the historian Polyaenus (fl. 2nd-century AD) recorded the supposed oldest known king in Illyria, Galaurus or Galabrus, a ruler of the Taulantii who reigned in the latter part of the 7th century BC. Some scholars consider the authenticity of Polyaenus' passage as disputable. Whether or not this account is historically reliable, and despite Polyaenus' interest in the anecdote, it implies the widespread thought throughout antiquity about a significant animosity between the Macedonians and the Illyrians as early as the 7th century BC, if the consensus in modern scholarship in dating the reigning period of Argaeus I is correct.

Friendly relationships were created between Corinthians and certain Illyrian tribes. In the 7th century BC, the Taulantii invoked the aid of Corinth and Corcyra in a war against the Liburni. After the defeat and expulsion of the Liburni from the region, the Corcyreans were welcomed in 627 BC on the Illyrian coast in the city of Epidamnos mixing with the local population and establishing the larger trading system to the port. The city was called Epidamnos-Dyrrhachion, thought to have been the names of two barbarian/Illyrian rulers of the region. The double name was determined by the presence of a pre-existing Illyrian settlement presumably located on the hills (Epidamnos), while the plain, formerly occupied by a lagoon communicating with the sea, provided favorable conditions that created a natural harbor (Dyrrachion). The city was therefore founded in a territory that corresponded to a narrow promontory surrounded by the sea that gave the city the appearance of an island. A flourishing commercial centre emerged and the city grew rapidly. It thrived for about two centuries, mainly as a result of trade with the neighboring Illyrians of the hinterland, which was mediated by a magistrate, called poletes ('seller'). The poletes was chosen each year from among the citizens who were deemed worthy by the Epidamnians.

Justin (2nd century AD) reports that at a time when the ruler of Macedonia was the infant Aeropus I (around 6th century BC), the Illyrians successfully attacked Macedonia until the infant ruler was brought to a battle by his Macedonian subjects, benefitting from his presence and avenging their initial defeat against the Illyrians. The name of the specific Illyrian tribe or group of tribes that attacked Macedonia is not reported in Justin's account, but it has been suggested that they would have been either the Enchelei, whose realm was centered at that time in the area of Lake Lychnidus, or the Taulantii, who were based farther west, in the coastal area within and around Epidamnos and Apollonia. The Illyrian raids against the Argeads who were based at Aegae indicate that Illyrian attacks also involved the Upper Macedonian regions of Lynkestis, Orestis and Eordaea, Elimeia, and Tymphaea, as they were located between Illyrian territory and Argead lands.

=== Classical period ===
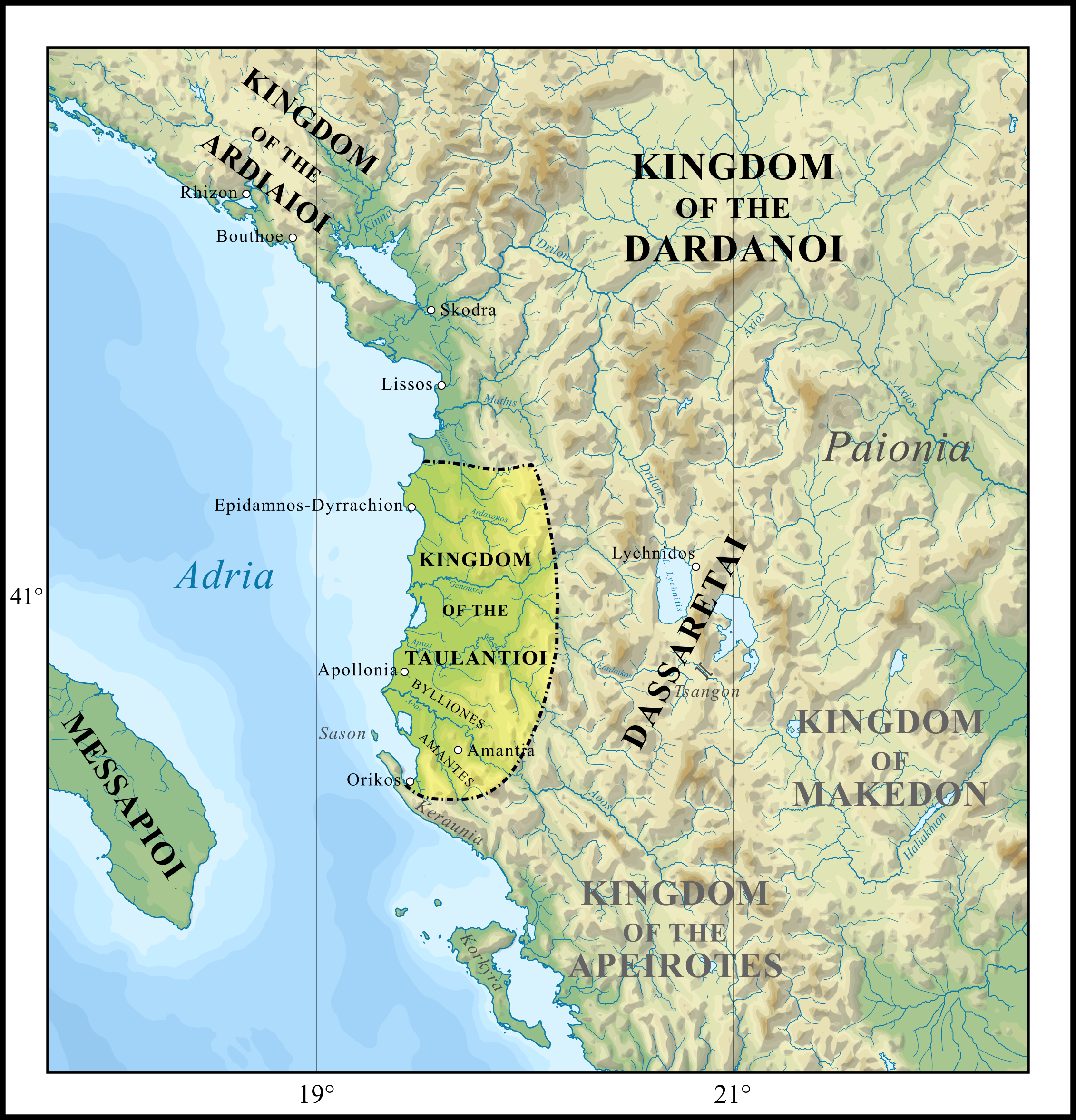
The Taulantian kingdom under the rule of Glaucias.

The Taulantii continued to play an important role in Illyrian history between the 5th and 4th–3rd centuries BC, and in particular in the history of Epidamnos-Dyrrhachion, not only as its neighbors but also as part of its population. Although the Epidamnians established the figure of a trade magistrate (poletes) to avoid the influence of the native people surrounding Epidamnos, it wasn't enough to prevent intervention of neighboring Illyrians in the internal affairs of the city. The constitution of Epidamnos was initially oligarchic, and many inhabitants were not citizens. In 435 BC, the city suffered an intense civil war undertaken between the democratic faction and the aristocratic faction. After the democrats had seized power, the exiled oligarchs joined with the neighboring Taulantii to retake the city. The Illyrians besieged the city in strength, and through the occupation of the surrounding region, they caused much damage to the economy of the city. The social crisis caused the intervention of the two mother cities: Corinth on the side of the democrats and Corcyra on the side of the aristocrats and native Illyrians. Corcyra won the naval battle against Corinth, taking Epidamnos and driving out the demos. At the end of the naval battle Athens, the leader of the Delian League, took sides with the Corcyreans, as Corinth was already allied with Sparta within the Peloponnesian League. This was the pretext for the Peloponnesian War as reported by Thucydides.

In the well attested historical period, the Taulantian kingdom seems to have reached its apex during Glaukias' rule, in the years between 335 BC and 295 BC. Glaucias had entered into an alliance and joined the cause of another Illyrian dynast, Cleitus son of Bardylis, who revolted against Alexander the Great, in the siege of Pelium (335 BC). However, they were both defeated and Cleitus was forced to take refuge within the Taulantian territories. Unlike the Illyrians of Cleitus, king Glaukias and the Taulantii had not accepted Macedonian rule, and remained independent.

=== Hellenistic period ===
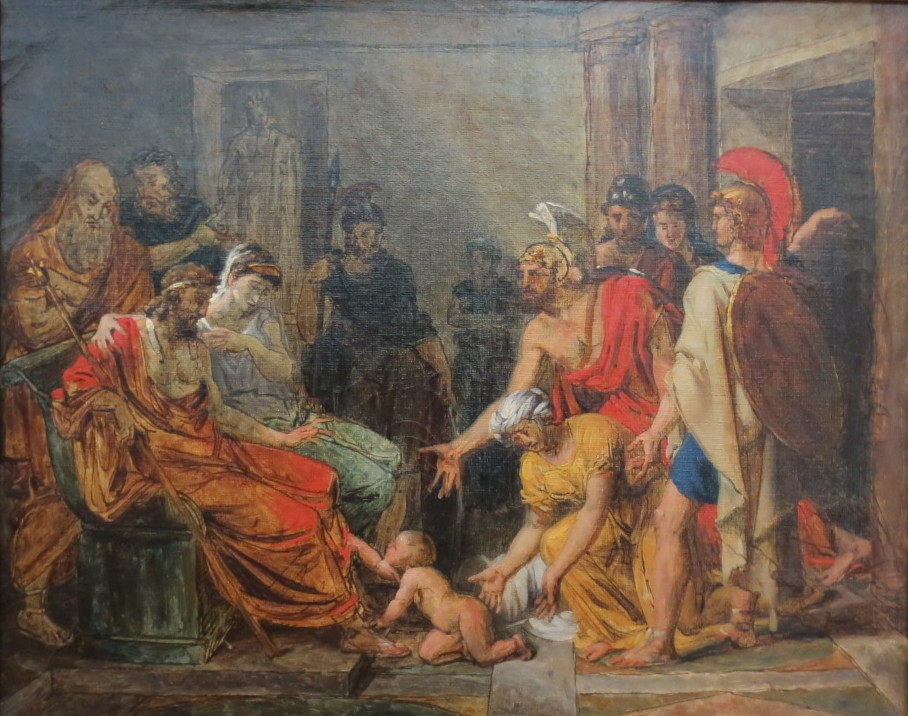
The young Pyrrhus at the court of King Glaukias by Hyacinthe Collin de Vermont, c. 1750.

After 323 BC, Epidamnus-Dyrrhachium was involved in the intervention in Illyria of the Macedonians under Cassander, who clashed with the Illyrians under Glaukias. In 314 BC, the Macedonian king seized the city but the garrison he established there was in turn besieged and driven out by the Illyrian king and the Corcyrans. In 312 BC, after another unsuccessful attack of Cassander in the region, the city came under the protection of Glaukias. Those events marked the end of Macedonian presence on the Adriatic coast for almost one century.

The Taulantii were involved in the struggle between Macedonia and Epirus when the Illyrian king Glaukias offered asylum to the infant Pyrrhus after his father Aeacides was expelled from his kingdom among the Molossians. Pyrrhus was raised by Glaukia's wife Beroea, who was a member of the Aeacid dynasty. The Aeacides apparently softened their conflictual relations with the Illyrians, similar to the Argeads, by occasional marriages. Pyrrhus lived with Glaukias for ten years, and he was likely even adopted by the Illyrian king as a son. In 306 BC, Glaukias established Pyrrhus on the Epirote throne, where he ruled with Illyrian help until he attended the wedding of one of his adoptive brothers (son of Glaukias) in 302. In Pyrrhus' absence, Molossians replaced him with Neoptolemus, another member of the Aeacides. Pyrrhus managed to murder Neoptolemus and eventually regained the throne. As king of Epirus, Pyrrhus strengthened his links with the Illyrian tribes by marriage alliances. In the 290s and the 280s, Pyrrhus established his dominion in southern Illyria, thanks to his long and close relations with Glaukias' family and to his marriage to the Illyrian princess Bircenna, daughter of Bardylis II. Beroea's marriage with Glaukias and Pyrrhus' links with the Illyrians probably point to long-standing barbarian connections of the regions of Illyria and Epirus. After Glaukias' rule, the Taulantian territory likely were absorbed partly by Pyrrhus in the Epirotan state and partly by other Illyrian realms established in southern Illyria.

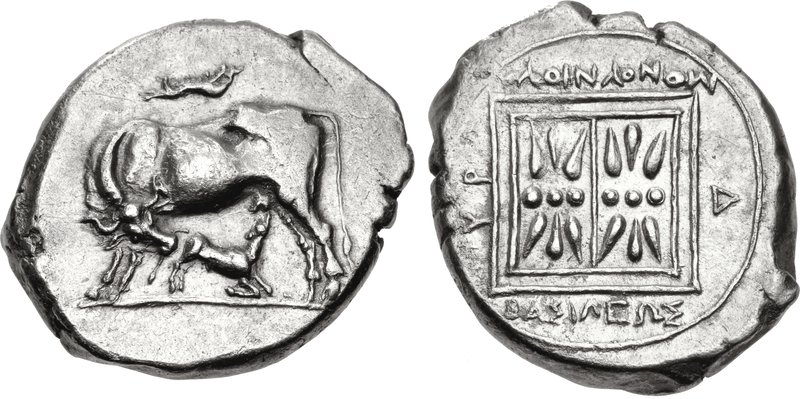
Silver stater of the Illyrian king Monunius, c. 280 BC from the Dyrrhachion mint.

From about 280 BC, Glaukias'successor, Monunius, and the latter's successor and likely son, Mytilos, minted in Dyrrhachion silver and bronze coins respectively, bearing the king's name and the symbol of the city. The fact that their coins were struck in the city mint of Dyrrhachion stresses that they exercised to some extent their authority over the city. Illyrians under Mytilus clashed with the Epirotes under Alexander II son of Pyrrhus, as reported by Pompeius Trogus (1st century BC) and Frontinus (1st century AD).

=== Roman period ===
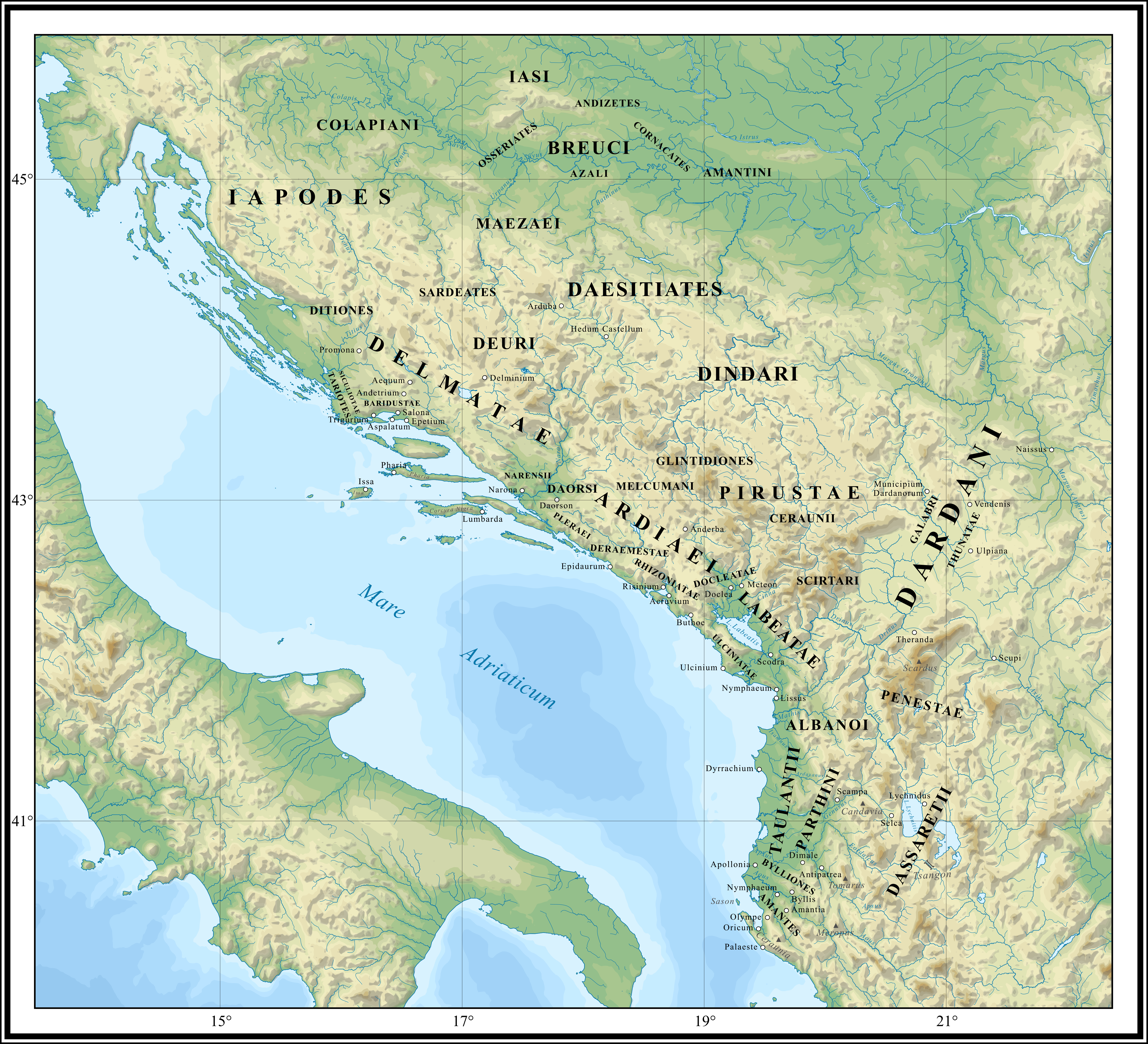
Illyrian tribes in the 1st-2nd centuries CE.

As reported by Livy (1st century BC), after the 167 victory of the Romans in the Third Illyrian War, the Roman Senate decided to give freedom to "Issenses et Taulantios, Dassaretiorum Pirustas, Rhizonitas, Olciniatas". Those tribes were rewarded by Rome because they abandoned the Illyrian (Lebeatan) king Gentius a little before his defeat, and thereafter remained independent polities. For a similar reason Daorsi too gained immunitas, while the inhabitants of Scodra, Dassarenses and Seleptani, as well as other Illyrians, had to pay half of the tax.

The Taulantii appear as one of the Illyrian peoples defeated by Octavian during the course of the Illyrian war he undertook in 35–33 BC. They are mentioned along with other Illyrian tribes: Oxyaei, Pertheenatae, Bathiatae, Cambaei, Cinambri, Merromeni, and Pyrissaei. Octavian defeated them in a single military expedition, probably departing partly from Brundisium, and partly from the military bases in Roman Illyria. Since the Taulantii were located in the hinterland of Dyrrhachium and Apollonia, Octavian's army was involved in the regional dominions that belonged to Mark Antony. One of Octavian's aims in the Illyrian war was most likely to take control of the southeastern Adriatic harbours of Lissus, Dyrrhachium and Apollonia. Octavian was particularly interested in Dyrrhachium, as it was the most important harbour, and later it must have become a key naval base of Octavian's fleet.

== Culture ==
=== Language ===
The idiom spoken by the Taulanti is included in the southern Illyrian onomastic province in modern linguistics. The territory they inhabited belongs to the area that is considered in current scholarship as the linguistic core of Illyrian.

=== Cuisine ===
The Abri, a northern subgroup of the Taulantii, were known to the ancient Greek writers for their technique of preparing mead from honey.

== Taulantian dynasty ==
The following names are recorded in ancient sources as Taulantian chieftains and/or Illyrian kings:

- Galaurus or Galabrus (latter part of the 7th century BC), the oldest known Illyrian king, recorded by Polyaenus (fl. 2nd-century AD); the authenticity of Polyaenus' passage is disputed;
- Pleuratus I (fl. c. 345 – 344 BC);
- Glaucias (fl. c. 335 – 295 BC), who fought against Alexander the Great and raised Pyrrhus of Epirus, briefly installing him on the throne.

The Illyrian king Monounios, who minted his own silver staters bearing the king's name and the symbol of Dyrrhachion from about 290 BC, is considered the successor of Glaucias, and probably his son. Their realm also included the southern part of the kingdom of Agron and Teuta.

== See also ==
- List of ancient Illyrian peoples and tribes
- List of ancient tribes in Illyria
- Taulas (Eponymous ancestor)
