= Dardani =

Ancient tribe in the Balkans

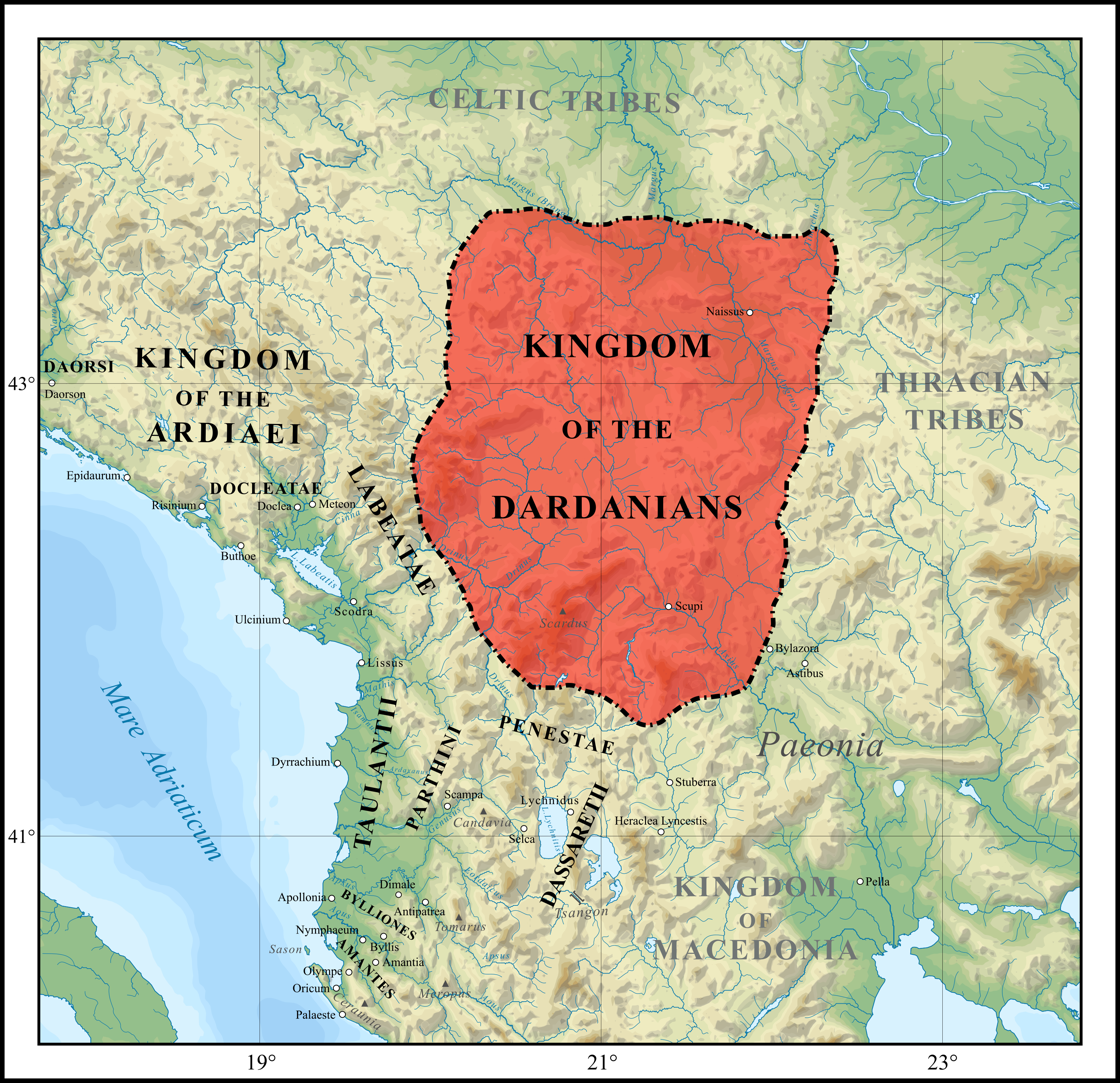
- By the 3rd century the location of the Dardani had resolved itself into the Kingdom of Dardania, which is shown in red. The solid lines give modern borders: Serbia, Kosovo, North Macedonia across the south, Albania to the SW, and Montenegro to the NW.

Languages
- Palaeo-Balkan language group

The Dardani (/ˈdɑːrdənaɪ/; Ancient Greek: Δαρδάνιοι, Δάρδανοι; Latin: Dardani) or Dardanians were a Paleo-Balkan people, who lived in a region that came to be known as Dardania after their settlement there. They were among the oldest Balkan peoples, and their society was very complex. The Dardani were the most stable and conservative ethnic element among the peoples of the central Balkans, retaining an enduring presence in the region for several centuries.

Ancient tradition considered the Dardani to be an Illyrian people. Strabo, in particular, also mentioning Galabri and Thunatae as Dardanian tribes, describes the Dardani as one of the three strongest Illyrian peoples, the other two being the Ardiaei and Autariatae. As Dardanians followed their own peculiar geographical, social and political development in Dardania, some ancient sources also distinguish them from those Illyrians dwelling in the central and southern coast of the eastern Adriatic Sea and its hinterland, who had constituted their own socio-political formation, referred to as 'Illyrian kingdom' by ancient authors. The Dardani were also related to their Thracian neighbors. In Roman times, Thracian names appear in the eastern strip of Dardania, and several Thracian and Dacian placenames also appear there, such as Dardapara and Quemedava, but Illyrian names dominated the rest. Nevertheless, ancient authors have not identified Dardanians with Thracians, and Strabo explicitly makes a clear distinction between them.

The Kingdom of Dardania was attested since the 4th century BC in ancient sources reporting the wars the Dardanians waged against their south-eastern neighbor – Macedon – until the 2nd century BC. The historian Justin, a main source about the history of the Macedonian kings, refers to an 'lllyrian war' between 346 and the end of 343 BC, fought by 'Dardani and other neighbouring peoples' against Philip II of Macedon, who won the conflict. After the Celtic invasion of the Balkans weakened the state of the Macedonians and Paeonians, the political and military role of the Dardanians began to grow in the region. They expanded their state to the area of Paeonia, which definitively disappeared from history, and to some territories of the southern Illyrians. The Dardanians strongly pressured Macedon, using every opportunity to attack it. However the Macedonians quickly recovered and consolidated their state, and the Dardanians lost their important political role. The strengthening of the Illyrian (Ardiaean–Labeatan) state on their western borders also contributed to the restriction of Dardanian warlike actions towards their neighbors.

The Dardani sided with Rome in the Roman-Macedonian Wars, continuing their clashes with Macedon. After the defeat of Macedon in the Third Macedonian War, the fragile Dardanian-Roman alliance weakened, in particular after the Senate's decision not to return to the Dardanian kingdom the territory that had been previously conquered by the Macedonians, notably Paeonia, which the Dardani claimed as their own territory. The Senate only recognized the Dardani the right to trade salt. Thereafter, from sworn enemies of Macedonia, the Dardani became enemies of Rome. Dardanians fought against Roman proconsuls, and were finally defeated probably by Marcus Antonius in 39 BC or by Marcus Licinius Crassus in 29/8 BC. The Romans created the province of Moesia also including the territory of Dardania. After the Roman emperor Domitian divided the province of Moesia into Moesia Superior and Moesia Inferior in 86 AD, the Dardani were located in southern Moesia Superior. A Roman colony was established at Scupi in Dardanian territory under the Flavian dynasty. In the 2nd century AD Dardanians were still notorious as brigands (latrones dardaniae). During the late Imperial period their territory was the homeland of a number of Roman emperors, notably Constantine the Great and Justinian I.

Inscriptions from the Roman and Byzantine period have been found in Dardania, including one in the ancient city of Ulpiana which reads Urbem Dardania and two in Scupi which read Dardanus and Albanoi or Albanopolis.

== Name ==
The ethnonym of the Dardani has been attested in ancient Greek literature as Dardaneis, Dardanioi and Dardanoi, and in Latin as Dardani. The term used for their territory was Dardanike (Δαρδανική). The root Dard-/Derd- is attested outside the Dardanian region and the Trojan-Dardanian area in several other ancient ethnonyms, personal names, and toponyms: Derdas, a praetor of the Epirotes; Δερδιενις, name of Macedonian-Elimiot princes; Δερδια in Thessaly; Δερδενις in Lesbos; in ancient Apulia Dardi, a Daunian tribe, Derdensis a region and Δαρδανον, a Daunian settlement. The suffix -ano in Dard- was common to multiple Indo-European languages.

The names of the two main Dardanian tribes – Galabri/Galabrioi and Thunatae/Thunatai – have been respectively connected to the Messapic Kalabroi/Calabri and Daunioi/Daunii in Apulia (south-eastern Italy), of Palaeo-Balkan provenance.

=== Etymology ===
The name Dardan- (ethnonym: Δάρδανοι/Dardani; toponym: Δαρδανική/Dardania) is traditionally connected to the same root as dardhë, the Albanian word for 'pear', as well as Alb. dardhán, dardán, 'farmer'. The ethnonym Pirustae, which is attested since Roman times for a tribe close to the Dardani or living in Dardania, is considered to be the Latin translation of Dardani (cf. Latin pirus "pear"), which would confirm the link with the Albanian dardhë.

In 1854, Johann Georg von Hahn was the first to propose that the names Dardanoi and Dardania were related to the Albanian word dardhë ("pear, pear-tree"). This is suggested by the fact that toponyms related to fruits or animals are not unknown in the region (cf. Alb. dele, delmë "sheep" supposedly related to Dalmatia, Ulcinj in Montenegro < Alb. ujk, ulk "wolf" etc.). Albanian typical toponyms formed with the same root as dardhë have been attested: Dardhan-i (in 1467 CE), Dardhanesh-i (1431), Dardhasi (1431), Dardas (1467), Dardhë-a (1417), Darda, Dardhicë-a (1431). Several modern toponyms are found in various parts of Albania, including Dardha in Berat, Dardha in Korça, Dardha in Librazhd, Dardha in Puka, Dardhas in Pogradec, Dardhaj in Mirdita, and Dardhës in Përmet. Dardha in Puka is recorded as Darda in a 1671 ecclesiastical report and on a 1688 map by a Venetian cartographer. Dardha is also the name of an Albanian tribe in the northern part of the District of Dibra.

Opinions differ on the etymon of the root in Proto-Albanian, and eventually in Proto-Indo-European. On the basis of an alleged connection between Albanian dardhë and Greek ἄχερδος, ἀχράς "wild pear", a common Indo-European root has been tentatively reconstructed by scholars: *ĝʰor-d- "thorn bush"; *(n)ĝʰ∂rdis; *ĝʰerzd⁽ʰ⁾- "thorny, grain, barley". However it has been suggested that this connection is only conceivable assuming an ancient common Balkano-Aegean substrate word for Albanian and Greek. A proposed Indo-European root *dʰeregh- "a thorny plant", with the Proto-Albanian form reconstructed as *dʰorĝʰ-eh₂-, is not clear. More recently for the Albanian dardhë the Proto-Albanian *dardā has been reconstructed, itself a derivative of derdh "to tip out, pour, spill, secrete, cast (metals)" < PAlb *derda. In Old Albanian texts the root is recorded not umlautized: dardh. It continues Proto-Albanian *darda, which is close to onomatopoeic Lithuanian dardĕti "to rattle" Latvian dàrdêt "to creak", Welsh go-dyrddu "to mumble, to gumble" (the semantic development of "pear" that occurs in Albanian can also be seen in the Slavic parallel gruša, kruša "pear, pear tree" < *grušiti, *krušiti "to crumble, to break", and also in the Indo-European parallel *peisom "pear" < *peis-). Slavic toponyms with "Kruševo" (from Proto-Slavic kruša, "pear") and other related toponyms particularly found in the area of the ancient Dardani have been proposed as South Slavic translations of Darda- toponyms.

Other roots have been connected to the name Dardan- by some scholars. It has been proposed a possible link to darda "bee", maybe originally with the meaning of "noise", "chatter", compared with Sanskrit dardurá- "frog", "pipe", Lithuanian dardėt́i "to rattle", "chatter" (which however is regarded by Orel as an onomatopoeic form connected to Albanian derdh, hence to dardhë, see above), Gkreek δάρδα · μέλισσα "bee", sometimes interpreted as μόλυσμα "stain", δαρδαίνει · μολύνει "to stain", both late antique attestations from Hesychius (5th century CE) and with aberrant semantics. Another link has been made with the PIE root *dhereĝh- "to hold", "strong", which would have evolved to dard- in consistency with the phonetic change of voiced palatal velars that are a characteristic trait of Albanian.

The opinion criticising the etymologies based on roots that originally included *g̑h because in the earliest form of Albanian PIE *g̑h turned into *dʑ and correspondingly later into *dz, which should have been spelled in Greek/Latin documents with /z/, /s/, or a similar letter, instead of /d/, is refutable by the attestation of the Proto-Albanoid term diellina "henbane". This term was mentioned as a "Thracian-Dacian" phytonym by the Ancient Greek pharmacologist Pedanius Dioscorides (1st century AD), and it has a clear etymological connection with the Albanian word diell "sun" (diellina "henbane" belongs to the genus called solanum with the Latin root sol "sun", being so named because of its yellow leaves), displaying a characteristic Albanian phonetic change in which the voiced palatal velar *ĝ(h)- turned into the interdental dh or the dental d, passing through intermediate stages represented by the palato-alveolar affricate voiced ȷ́ [dʑ], dental affricate dz and further through a final stage dð (i.e. *ĝ(h)- > ȷ́ [dʑ] > dz > dð > dh/d: Alb. dielli < PAlb. *dðiella < *dziella- < EPAlb. *ȷ́élu̯a- < PIE *ǵʰélh₃u̯o- "yellow, golden, bright/shiny"). This phenomenon reflects the uncertainty of the Ancient Greek and Roman authors in transcribing the Proto-Albanian affricates, which were unfamiliar to them. Indeed, many similar examples of Palaeo-Balkan names with alternating spellings in ancient literature using both dentals and sibilants can be connected to an earlier stage of Albanian and furthermore provide strong support for Eric Hamp's thesis about the Proto-Albanoid dialects, spoken in the central-western Balkans including the historical regions of Dardania, Illyria proper, Paeonia, Upper Moesia, western Dacia and western Thrace.

=== The name in the ancient sources ===
The name of the Dardani is mentioned for the first time in the Iliad in the name of Dardanus who founded Dardanus on the Aegean coast of Anatolia and his people the Dardanoi, from which the toponym Dardanelles is derived. Other parallel ethnic names in the Balkans and Anatolia, respectively include: Eneti and Enetoi, Bryges and Phryges. These parallels indicate closer links than simply a correlation of names. According to a current explanation, the connection is likely related to the large-scale movement of peoples that occurred at the end of the Bronze Age (around 1200 BC), when the attacks of the 'Sea Peoples' afflicted some of the established powers around the eastern Mediterranean.

In ancient historiography, the Dardani of the Balkans are mentioned as a people in the second century BCE by Polybius who describes their wars against Macedon in the third century BC. Historians of Hellenistic and Roman antiquity who mention the Dardanians are Diodorus Siculus, Marcus Terentius Varro, Strabo, Sallust, Appian, Dionysius of Halicarnassus and others. According to a mythological tradition reported by Appian (2nd century AD), Dardanos (Δάρδανος), one of the sons of Illyrius (Ἰλλυριός), was the eponymous ancestor of the Dardanoi (Δάρδανοι). In ancient sources the Dardani are mentioned as one of the Illyrian people and/or as a distinct grouping in the region of Dardania. As such, the Dardani were Illyrians from an ethno-linguistic perspective, but they had followed their own peculiar geographical, social and political development in Dardania.

In the late 1st century BCE, in Rome a new ideological discourse was formed. Propagated by poets like Horace and Ovid, it constructed a glorious Trojan past for the Romans, who were claimed to be descendants of Trojan Dardanians. In the years before the Trojan origin story became the official Roman narrative about their origins, the Romans came into conflict in the Balkans with the Dardani. In public discourse this created the problem that the Roman army could be seen as fighting against a people who could be related to the ancestors of the Romans. The image of the historical Dardani in the 1st century BC was that of Illyrian barbarians who raided their Macedonian frontier and had to be dealt with. In this context, the name of a people known as the Moesi appeared in Roman sources. The Moesi are mentioned only in three ancient sources in the period after the death of Emperor Augustus in 14 CE. The name itself was taken from the name of the Mysians in Asia Minor. The choice seems to be related to the fact that the Trojan-era Mysians lived close to the Trojan-era Dardanians. As the name of the Dardani in Roman discourse became linked to the ancestors of the Romans, the actual Dardani began to be covered in Roman literature by other names. After the death of Augustus, their name in connection to the Balkans became a political problem. After the death of Augustus, the new emperor was Tiberius, his stepson and the most senior Roman general in the Balkans. As Tiberius had played a key role in the Roman conquest of the Balkans, as emperor he couldn't be portrayed as the conqueror of Dardanians, whose name had been constructed as the name of the mythical progenitors of the Romans. Thus, the decision to create a new name for Dardania and the Dardani was made. Despite this decision and the administrative use of the names Moesia and Moesi for the Dardani and Dardania, the original use of the name persisted by authors like Appian. The name Dardania was not used for several hundred years after this period in an administrative context. It was only recreated by Emperor Diocletian in the 3rd century CE.

== History ==
=== Emergence ===
The territory of present-day Kosovo which formed the core area of the Dardani has been inhabited since the Neolithic era. Runik and Vlashnjë are two of the most significant sites in the Neolithic period. During the late 3rd millennium BCE, Proto-Indo-European tribes migrated and settled in the region alongside the existing Neolithic population. New practices in agriculture and cattle breeding appear in this period and new settlements formed in Kosovo. Co-existence and intermingling of the Neolithic population and the PIE-speakers gave rise to the material culture which developed in the Bronze Age (2100-1100 BCE) in settlements including Vlashnjë, Korishë, Pogragjë, Bardhi i Madh and Topanicë.

Archaeological research in the territory of Dardania greatly expanded since 2000. In contemporary research, a periodization of four phases of development of pre-Roman Dardania is being utilized:

1. 11th-9th century BCE, a transitory period between the Bronze and the Iron Age
2. 8th-7th century BCE, Iron Age I phase
3. 6th-4th century BCE, Iron Age II phase, during which contacts with the Mediterranean and imports from Greece increase
4. 4th-1st century BCE, Hellenistic period.

In the Iron Age habitation further developed with the emergence of the Glasinac-Mat culture, an Illyrian material culture which developed in the Iron Age western Balkans. The Dardani - as they became known in classical antiquity - were one of the particular groups of the Glasinac-Mat culture.

The Brnjica cultural group was a Late Bronze Age cultural manifestation in what was to become Dardania, closely connected to the Balkan-Danubian complex. It dates between the 14th and 10th centuries BCE, and appears in Kosovo, Morava valley, Sandzak, Macedonia and South-East Serbia. In Yugoslavian historiography, starting from Milutin Garašanin in the 1970s and 1980s, the Brnjica culture came to be interpreted as the "Daco-Moesian" and non-"Illyrian" linguistic component of the later Dardani. Before that change, Yugoslavian scholars had regarded the Dardani as of Illyrian origin. The narrative of a distinct "Daco-Moesian" concept developed as a response to Albanian and Bulgarian researchers, and especially to changes inside Yugoslavia due to increasing local nationalisms.

=== Classical antiquity ===
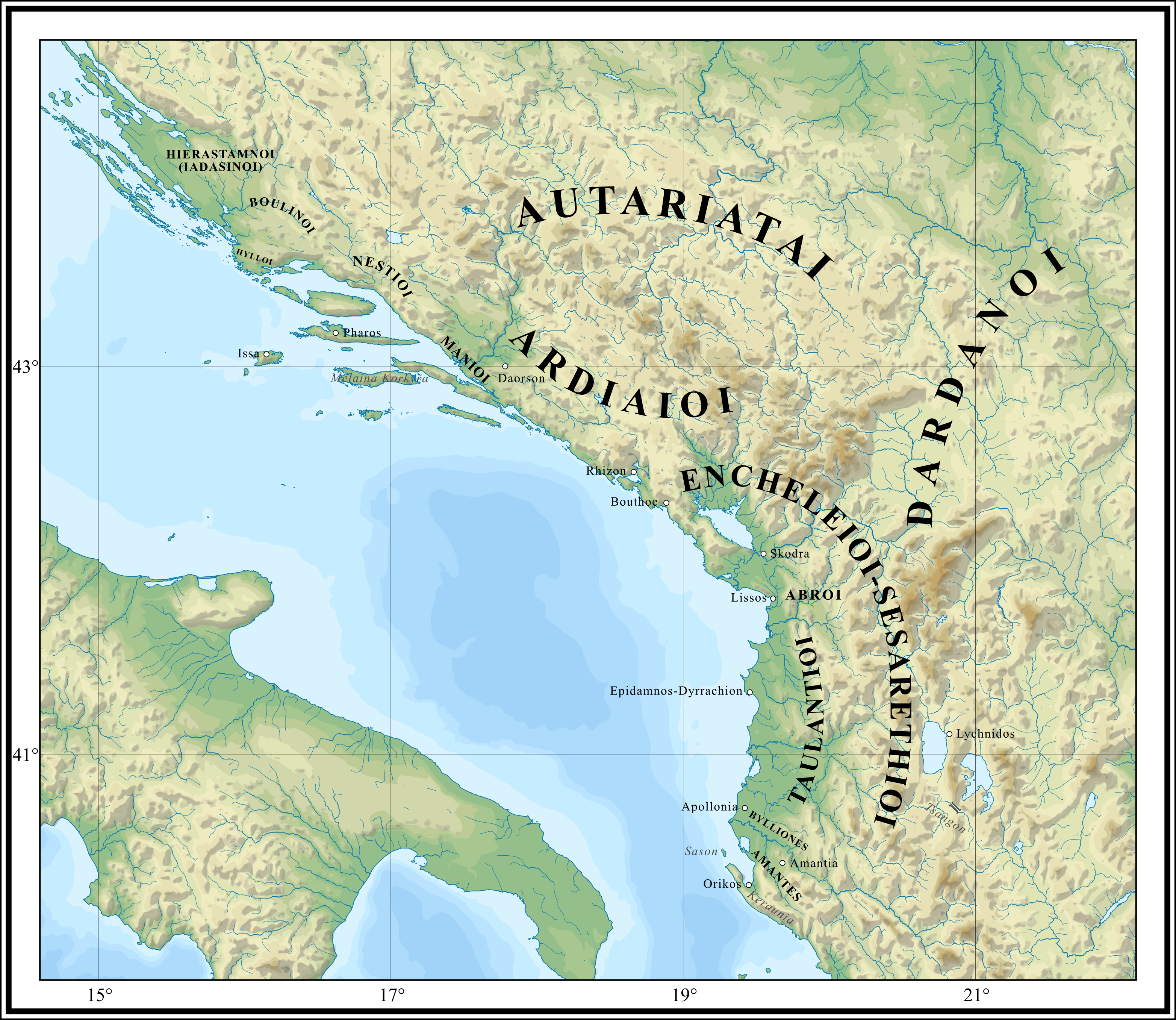
Illyrian tribes in the 7th–4th centuries BCE.

In Dardania tribal aristocracy and pre-urban development emerged from the 6th–5th centuries BC. The contacts of the Dardanians with the Mediterranean world began early and intensified during the Iron Age. Trade connections with the Ancient Greek world were created from the 7th century BC onwards. The proto-urban development was followed by the creation of urban centers and the emergence of craftsmanship, and a Dardanian polity began to develop from the 4th century BC. Material culture and accounts in classical sources suggest that Dardanian society reached an advanced phase of development.

The Dardani are referred to as one of the opponents of Macedon in the 4th century BC, clashing with Philip II who managed to subdue them and their neighbors, probably during the early period of his reign. The Dardani have remained quiet until Philip II's death, after which they were planning defection. However an open war have not been caused by their riots, since Alexander the Great managed to have the full control of the kingdom and its army after succeeding his father to the Macedonian throne. Indeed, the Dardani have not been mentioned in the ancient accounts concerning the events of Alexander's Balkan campaign. It appears that the Dardani evaded the Macedonian rule during the Wars of the Diadochi between 284 BC and 281 BC, at the time of Lysimachus'empire. Thereafter the Dardani became a constant threat to Macedon on its northern borders.

Distribution of the Dardanians and their neighbors in the Dardanian Kingdom and adjunct territories, as described by Arianit Buqinca

In 279 BC, at the times of the great Celtic invasion, Dardania was raided by several Celtic tribes on their campaigns that were undertaken to plunder the treasuries of Greek temples. During these events an unnamed Dardanian king offered to help the Macedonians with 20,000 soldiers to counteract the invading Celts, but it was refused by the Macedonian king Ptolemy Keraunos who, underestimating the Celtic strength, died fighting them. Only at the oracle of Delphi the Celts eventually arrested and were defeated. Afterwards they withdrew in the north passing through Dardania, however they were completely destroyed by the Dardani. Further references to the Dardani are provided in the ancient sources describing Dardanian constant wars against Macedonians from the second half of the 3rd century BC.

After the Celtic invasion of the Balkans weakened the state of the Macedonians and Paeonians, the political and military role of the Dardanians began to grow in the region. They expanded their state into the area of Paeonia which definitively disappeared from history. In 230 the Dardani under Longarus captured Bylazora from the Paeonians. Taking advantage of Macedonian weakness, in 229 the Dardani attacked Macedonia and defeated Demetrius II in an important battle. After obtaining a great victory over the Macedonian army the Dardani invaded Macedon proper. The Dardanian expansion in Macedon, similar to the Ardiaean expansion in Epirus around the same years, may have been part of a general movement among the Illyrian peoples.

In this period Dardanian influence on the region grew and some other Illyrian tribes deserted Teuta, joining the Dardani under Longarus and forcing Teuta to call off her expedition forces in Epirus. When Philip V rose to the Macedonian throne, skirmishing with Dardani began in 220-219 BCE and he managed to capture Bylazora from them in 217 BCE. Skirmishes continued in 211 and in 209 when a force of Dardani under Aeropus, probably a pretender to the Macedonian throne, captured Lychnidus and looted Macedonia taking 20.000 prisoners and retreating before Philip's forces could reach them.

=== Macedonian Wars ===
During the Second Macedonian War, the Dardani were allied with Rome in the coalition against Macedon.

After its victory in the First Roman-Illyrian War, Rome had established the Protectorate of Illyricum, in the southern Illyrian coastland (south-eastern Adriatic). Due to the wars against Macedonia and for their own interests in the region, Dardanians entered into alliance with the Romans around 200 BCE. They became part of an anti-Macedonian coalition, also participating in the Second Macedonian War. In 200 BCE Bato of Dardania along with Pleuratus III, ruler of the Illyrian kingdom of the Labeatae, and Amynander king of Athamania, cooperated with Roman consul Sulpicius in his expedition against Philip V of Macedon. During the winter of 197-196 BCE, the Dardanians attacked Macedonia again devastating part of it, which forced Philip to withdraw from the war against the Romans in order to defend the frontier against the Dardani. After Philip's defeat against the Romans at the Battle of Cynoscephalae, he gathered 6,000 infantry and 500 cavalry and defeated the Dardani in a battle near Stobi, in which Dardani suffered great losses.

This put Philip in a difficult position, and in order to prevent the Dardanian reprisal and the continuation of their attacks which would have led to the invasion of Macedonia, around 183 BCE he made an agreement with the Bastarnae (a people who lived beyond the Danube) to destroy the Dardani and settle in their territory. For the feasibility of the plan, Philip arranged the safety of the passage of the Bastarnae through Thracian territory, offering gifts to the Thracian kings. A joint campaign of the Bastarnae and Macedonians against the Dardanians was thereby organized, and Philip's son, Perseus of Macedon, went with the avant-guard into Thrace. In the meantime Philip was leading the main Macedonian army from Amphipolis. The Bastarnae departed in the summer of 179 BCE, but soon after having sent their messengers to Amphipolis, before reaching Philip they were informed that the Macedonian king had died. With this event, the Macedonian-Bastarnae settlement scheme collapsed, and the deal between the Macedonians and Thracians fell through, so conflicts between the Thracians and the Bastarnae could not be prevented. In this situation, many Bastarnae returned home in 179/178 BCE, but 30,000 of them, led by Clondicus, chose to continue their march against the Dardani to occupy their land. With Philip V's death, the throne went to his son Perseus, who may have assisted the Bastarnae led by Clondicus in their invasion of Dardania.

The massive invasion of the Bastarnae exposed the Dardani to great danger, with serious consequences, so in 177 BCE, they sent a delegation to the Roman Senate to complain to their allies about the attacks of Perseus' Macedonians and Clondicus' Bastarnae. The situation claimed by the Dardani was initially confirmed by a Thessalian delegation, and finally whitnessed by Roman envoys sent to the Bastarnae and the Macedonians, presumably in order to reach an agreement to make peace with the Dardani. Returning to Rome in 175 BCE, the Roman delegation attested the situation to the Senate, and announced that the war was in progress in Dardania and that the responsible party was the Macedonian king Philip V. Around the same time, Macedonian envoys were sent to the Romans to deny Perseus' involvement, but the Roman Senate warned him to respect the treaty he had established with Rome.

The Romans apparently did nothing to stop the Dardanian–Bastarnic war or to help the Dardanians, their allies, in this conflict. The Dardani had to fight alone against the Bastarnae, who were reinforced by their Thracian and Scordiscan allies. The Dardani waited to attack until the Bastarnae's allies went home for the winter; either in late 176 BC, or the early winter of 175–174 BCE. The Dardani ultimately won the war. But shortly afterward (in late winter of 175 BCE or 174 BCE), the Bastarne, allegedly with Perseus' help, moved to cross the frozen river of the Danube in order to undertake another war against the Dardani, but the weight of the massive Bastarnae troops caused the ice to collapse, and most of them perished there. In 169 BCE the daughter of the Dardanian king Monunious, Etuta, married the Illyrian king Genthius, so good relations between them were secured.

As king of Madedon, Perseus quickly consolidated his power and made preparations for a final war against Rome. Securing the borders with the Dardani was a priority, so in 169 BCE he launched a victorious military campaign against them, conquering and devastating parts of Dardania that bordered Macedon. Cities of the Penestae that were also defended by Illyrian and Roman garrisons were conquered, and the territory to the sout-west of Dardania around the Scardus Mountains was devastated and burned, thereafter acquiring the denomination of 'Illyria Deserta' ('Deserted Illyria'), serving the purpose to prevent Dardanian incursions into Macedonia and Illyris. Thereafter Perseus sent Macedonian ambassadors, including the Illyrian exile Pleuratus, to the Illyrian king Gentius to tell him of the Macedonian victories, in order to frighten the Labeatan king of the Illyrians – who in the previous Macedonian war were allied alongside the Dardani with Rome against Macedon – into siding this time with Macedonia against Rome. Gentius was not against the idea to fight the Romans, but he lacked resources. After the Roman invasion of Macedonia in 168 BCE, Perseus decided to give Gentius subsidy so a treaty was concluded between them, and an alliance was formed against Rome.

After the Third Macedonian War, the fragile Dardanian-Roman alliance weakened further, in particular after the Senate's decision not to return to the Dardanian kingdom the territory that had been previously conquered by the Macedonians, including Paeonia, which the Dardani claimed as their own territory. The Senate only recognized the Dardani the right to trade salt. Thereafter, from sworn enemies of Macedonia, the Dardani became enemies of Rome.

=== Roman era ===
Borders of the Roman provinces of Moesia Superior and subsequent Roman Dardania

After the Roman-Illyrian Wars and Roman-Macedonian Wars, Illyricum and Macedonia became Roman protectorates in 168 BC. The Dardani resisted Roman offensives of the years 97 BCE, 85 BCE, and 77/6 BCE. But in 75–73 BCE the Dardani had to face terrible conflicts against Rome, known as Bellum Dardanicum. During the Mithridatic Wars (88–63 BC) between the Roman Republic and Mithridates VI of Pontus, the Dardani, Eneti, and Sintians were raiding Roman Macedonia; after his arrival, the consul Sulla attacked them, reportedly devastating their territory.

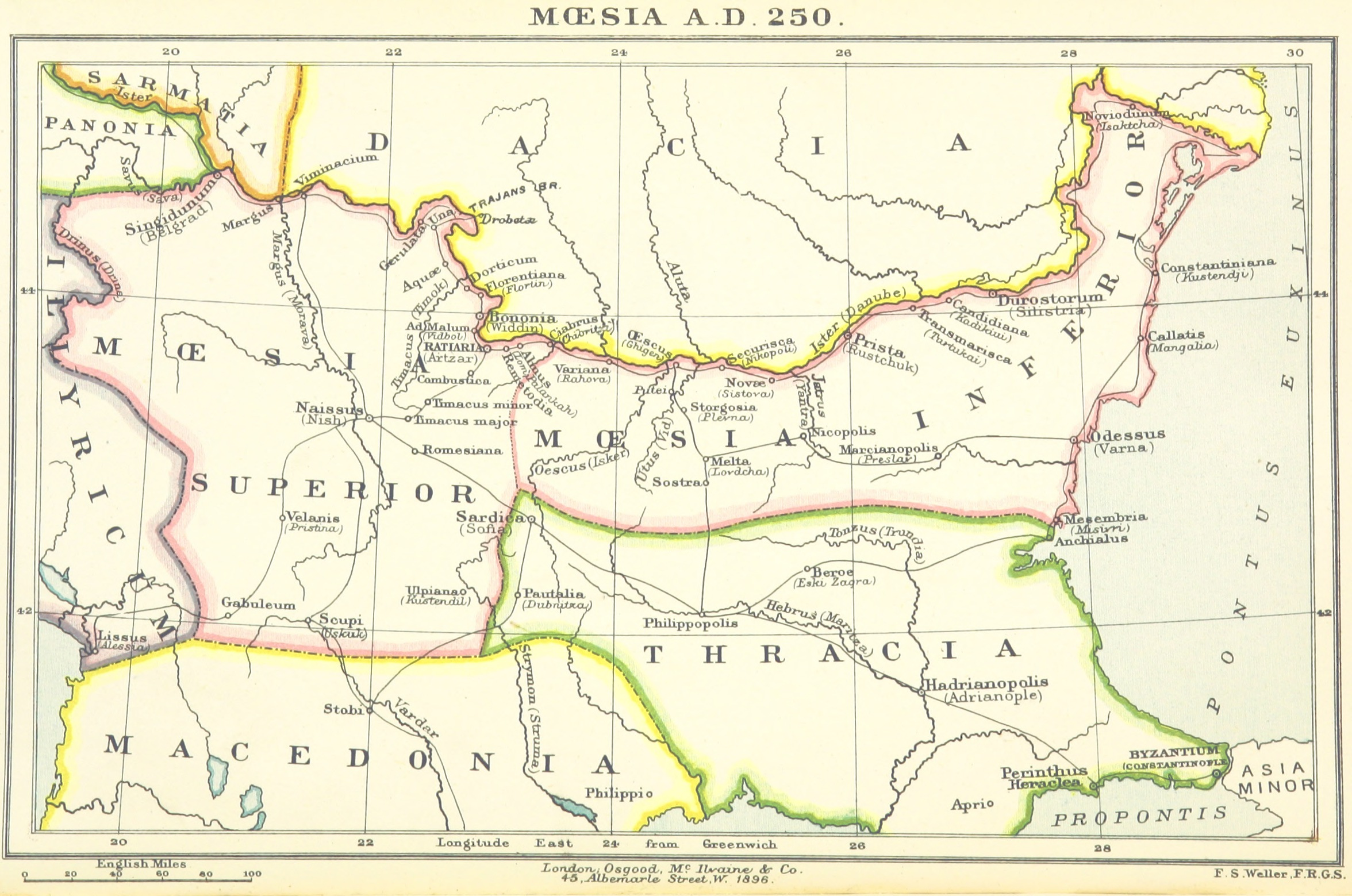
After the division of Roman Moesia into two provinces in 86 AD, the Dardani were located in southern Moesia Superior.

The Dardanians continued to fight against Roman proconsuls, and were finally defeated probably by Marcus Antonius in 39 BC or by Marcus Licinius Crassus in 29/8 BC. Under Roman administration they were included in the province of Moesia. After the Roman emperor Domitian divided the province of Moesia into Moesia Superior and Moesia Inferior in 86 AD, the Dardani were located in southern Moesia Superior. Emperor Diocletian later (284) made Dardania into a separate province with its capital at Naissus (Niš). The Romans found an already-developed economy in Dardania, based on agriculture and animal husbandry, mining and metallurgy, in different handicrafts and in trade. The Romans focused especially on exploitation of mines, same as in other provinces, and in road construction.

Dardania and the Balkans during the 6th century AD.

During the Byzantine administration (in the 6th century), there was a Byzantine province of Dardania that included cities of Ulpiana, Scupi, Justiniana Prima, and others.

== Polity ==
=== History of the tribal government ===
A Dardanian polity began to develop from the 4th century BC. The Kingdom of Dardania was attested since the 4th century BC in ancient sources reporting the wars the Dardanians waged against their south-eastern neighbor – Macedon – until the 2nd century BC. The Dardanian kingdom was made up of multiple tribes and tribal groups, as confirmed by Strabo, who mentions the Galabri and Thunatae as Dardanian tribes, and describes the Dardani as one of the three strongest Illyrian peoples, the other two being the Ardiaei and Autariatae.

The Dardanians always had separate domains from the rest of the Illyrians. The term used for their territory was (Δαρδανική), while other tribal areas had more unspecified terms, such as Autariaton khora (Αὐταριατῶν χώρα), for the "land of Autariatae." The term was used to describe the Dardanian political status as a semi-independent country in the later Roman Republic. Little data exists about the territory of the Dardani prior to Roman conquest, especially on its southern extent which has been contested with Macedon, so scholars use information provided in Roman times to define the bounds of Dardanian territory.

An unnamed Dardanian king is mentioned in ancient sources describing the events of the region of the early 3rd century BC. He offered the Macedonian king Ptolemy Ceraunos 20,000 soldiers to counteract the invading Celts, but Ceraunos declined the offer. Tribal chiefs Longarus and his son Bato took part in the wars against Romans and Macedonians.

=== Dardanian rulers ===
- Unnamed Dardanian king (early 3rd century BC), who offered the Macedonian king Ptolemy Ceraunos 20,000 soldiers to counteract the invading Celts, but Ceraunos declined the offer.
- Longarus;
  - Bato
  - Monunius II

Etuta (Etleva) was the daughter of Monunius II of Dardania and the Illyrian queen of Ardiaei. Some scholars believe that Illyrian rulers Bardylis, Audata, Cleitus (son of Bardylis), Bardylis II, Bircenna (daughter of Bardylis II), and Monunios were Dardanian, however this is considered an old fallacy because it is unsupported by any ancient source, while some facts and ancient geographical locations go squarely against it. Nevertheless, Bardylis, if not Dardanian, probably had some kind of hegemony on Dardanians during his reign.

== Foreign relations ==
=== Before Roman conquest ===
Unlike their Thracian neighbors, in pre-Roman times the Dardani were not Hellenized. From the Greek point of view, they were barbarians. Because of this, they are mentioned unfavorably in Ancient Greek and Roman sources. The tribe was viewed as "extremely barbaric". Claudius Aelianus and other writers wrote that they bathed only three times in their lives. At birth, when they were wed, and after they died. Strabo refers to them as wild and dwelling in dirty caves under dung-hills. This, however, may have had to do not with cleanliness, as bathing had to do with monetary status from the viewpoint of the Greeks.

=== After Roman conquest ===
Dardanian slaves or freedmen at the time of the Roman conquest were clearly of Paleo-Balkan origin, according to their personal names. It has been noted that personal names were mostly of the "Central-Dalmatian type".

== Culture ==
=== Language ===
Dardanian
- Native to: Kingdom of Dardania
- Region: central Balkans
- Ethnicity: Dardani
- Extinct: (date missing)
- Language family: Indo-European: (?) Albanoid; Dardanian

Language codes
- ISO 639-3: None (mis)
- Glottolog: None

The Dardanians had their own language. An extensive study based on onomastics of the Roman era has been undertaken by Radoslav Katičić which puts the Dardanian language area in the Central Illyrian area ("Central Illyrian" consisting of most of former Yugoslavia, north of southern Montenegro to the west of Morava, excepting ancient Liburnia in the northwest, but perhaps extending into Pannonia in the north). Another extensive study based on onomastics in Thrace, eastern Macedonia, Moesia, Dacia and Bithynia has been carried out by Dan Dana in the 2010s, also taking into consideration current Balkan historical linguistics. Dana concludes that the Illyrian character of Dardanian onomastics is unquestionable and that it is appropriate to definitively rule out the idea of a Thracian origin or participation (at least appreciable) in the ethnogenesis of the Dardani. Since the Thracians bordered the Dardani to the east, the eastern parts of Dardania were at the Thraco-Illyrian contact zone. As shown by archaeological research Illyrian names are predominant in western Dardania (present-day Kosovo), and occasionally appear in eastern Dardania (present-day south-eastern Serbia), while Thracian names are found in the eastern parts, but are absent from the western parts. The correspondence of Illyrian onomastics in Dardania – including those of the Dardanian ruling dynasty – with those of the southern Illyrians suggests "thracianization" of parts of Dardania at a later date. The linguistic relationship between 'Illyrian' and 'Thracian' is uncertain due to the paucity of the available written material of those languages, consisting only of onomastic and toponymic evidence in the case of Illyrian, and the same for Thracian except for a few short inscriptions of difficult interpretation. Dardanian in the context of a distinct language is considered in recent decades as potentially significant for the history of the Albanian language.

=== Religion ===
Graves from the 6th and 5th centuries BCE in Romajë contain long iron bars which were placed in the tombs as a means of payment to the afterlife. They indicate that the tribe of the Dardani had developed a concept about the afterlife as shown later in other archaeological material like the votive monument of Smirë. The weapons included double-edged axes (Labrys), which might have been used in a ritualistic manner related to sun worship, which was the chief cult object of the Illyrian religion, especially prominent among northern Illyrian tribes.

Among the characteristic Dardanian deities were Andinus, considered to have been the indigenous god of vegetation and soil fertility, and Dea Dardanica ("Dardanian Goddess"). They are attested in votive inscriptions of the Roman period in Dardania.

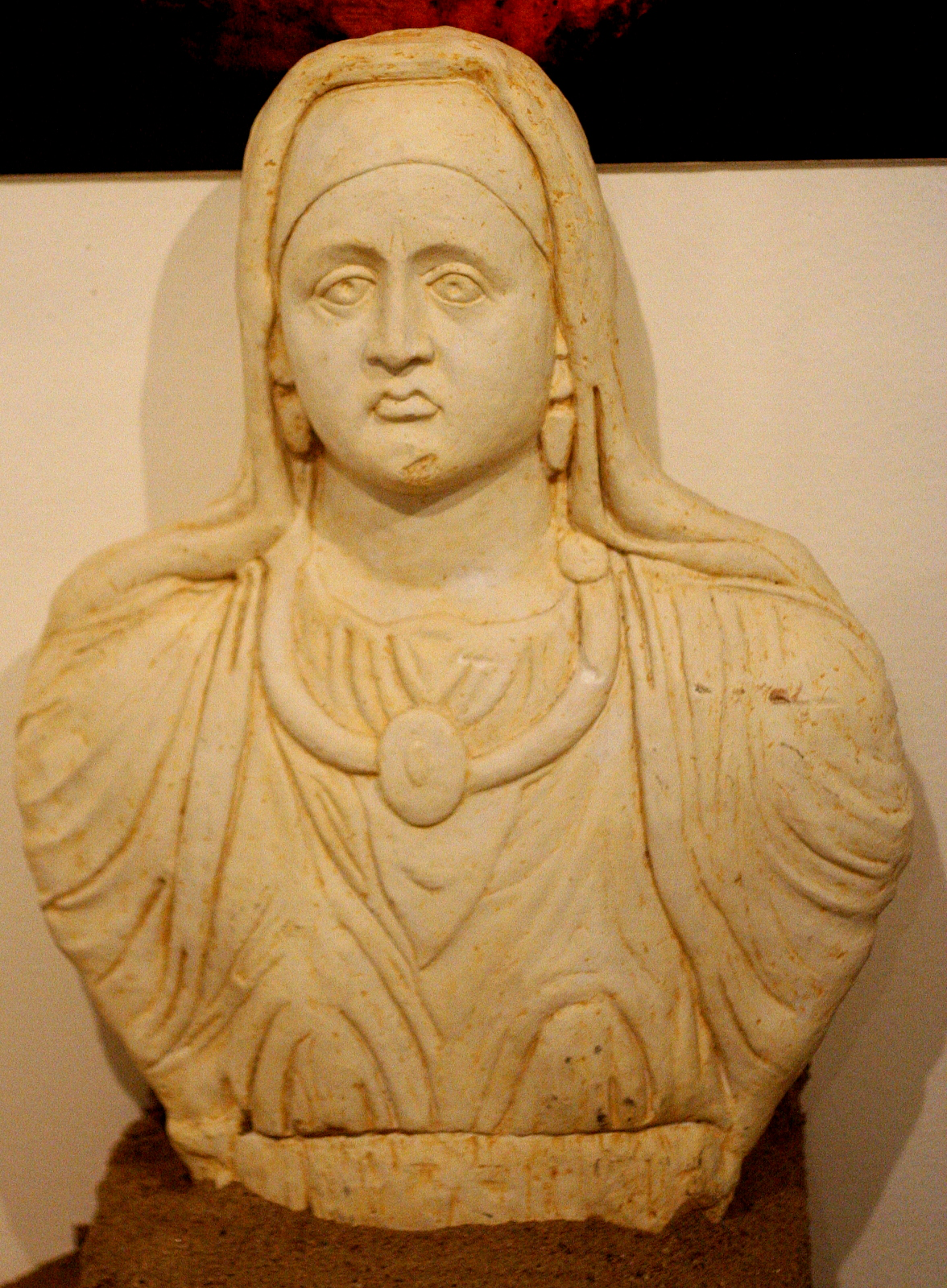
Dea Dardanica represented an ancient deity in Dardania

A monument representing a round labyrinth that was dedicated to the "Dardanian Goddess" was found in Smira. This monument provides evidence for cosmogonic and cosmologic knowledges among the Dardani. The labyrinth was realized based on the concept of the trinity. There is a numerological and geometric approach used through a multidimensional holographic field, which illustrates the Dardanian perception of the cosmic order and the interconnection between the material world and the higher realm.

Dardanian funerary stelae portray representations of their mourning practice. The lamentation of the dead is represented on the stelae through the depiction of the mourners with raised hands.

=== Music ===
Strabo writes that Dardanians cared about music, always using musical instruments, both of the wind and string type.

=== Dress ===
Dardanian stelae depict women wearing a xhubleta-like garment. The xhubleta is a bell-shaped dress worn by Albanian women of the northern highlands, which survived from ancient times exclusively in Albanian-inhabited territories.

== See also ==
- List of ancient Illyrian peoples and tribes
- List of ancient tribes in Illyria
- Illyrians
- Thracians

== Bibliography ==
- Alaj, Premtim (2019). Les habitats de l'Age du fer sur le territoire de l'actuel Kosovo (Thesis). Université de Lyon.
- Baliu, Begzad (2012). Onomastikë dhe identitet [Onomastics and Identity] (PDF) (in Albanian). Era. ISBN 978-9951-04-071-6.
- Bido, Agim (1998). "Pagan Symbols in Albanian Xhubleta". The Thracian world at the crossroads of civilisations. Vol. 2. Institutul Român de Tracologie. pp. 701–712.
- Boteva, Dilyana (2021). Mitthof, Fritz; Cenati, Chiara; Zerbini, Livio (eds.). "Society and Myths: How was the Name of Moesia Invented?". Ad Ripam Fluminis Danuvi: Papers of the 3rd International Conference on the Roman Danubian Provinces, Vienna, 11th–14th November 2015.
- Buqinca, Arianit (2021). Recherche sur les Dardaniens : VIe- Ier siècles av. J.- C. (Thesis) (in French). Université de Lyon. OCLC 1254025622.
- Burton, Paul J. (2017). Rome and the Third Macedonian War. Cambridge University Press. ISBN 9781107104440.
- Cabanes, Pierre (2002) [1988]. Dinko Čutura; Bruna Kuntić-Makvić (eds.). Iliri od Bardileja do Gencia (IV. – II. stoljeće prije Krista) [The Illyrians from Bardylis to Gentius (4th – 2nd century BC)] (in Croatian). Translated by Vesna Lisičić. Svitava. ISBN 953-98832-0-2.
- Crăciun, Radu (2023). "Diellina, një bimë trako-dake me emër proto-albanoid" [Diellina, a Thracian-Dacian plant with a Proto-Albanoid name]. Studime Filologjike (1–2). Centre of Albanological Studies: 77–83. doi:10.62006/sf.v1i1-2.3089. ISSN 0563-5780.
- Crossland, R. A. (1982). "Linguistic problems of the Balkan area in late prehistoric and early classical periods". In J. Boardman; I. E. S. Edwards; N. G. L. Hammond; E. Sollberger (eds.). The Cambridge Ancient History: The Prehistory of the Balkans; and the Middle East and the Aegean world, tenth to eighth centuries B.C. Vol. III (part 1) (2 ed.). Cambridge University Press. ISBN 0521224969.
- Dana, Dan (2014). Onomasticon Thracicum (OnomThrac): Répertoire des noms indigènes de Thrace, Macédoine Orientale, Mésies, Dacie et Bithynie. Meletēmata / Kentron Hellēnikēs kai Rōmaïkēs Archaiotētos (in French). Vol. 70. Centre de recherche de l'antiquité grecque et romaine, Fondation nationale de la recherche scientifique. ISBN 9789609538244.
- Dedvukaj, Lindon (2025). "The 'queen bee' of the highlands: An etymological analysis of the Albanian xhubleta". Proceedings of the Linguistic Society of America. 10 (1). Linguistic Society of America. doi:10.3765/plsa.v10i1.5881.
- Drançolli, Jahja (2020). "Kosova: Archaeological Heritage". In Claire Smith (ed.). Encyclopedia of Global Archaeology. Springer International Publishing. pp. 4308–4319. ISBN 9783030300166.
- Darlishta, Hana (2019). Овоштарската лексика на албанските говори во Македонија (Thesis). Ss. Cyril and Methodius University of Skopje.
- Demiraj, Bardhyl (1997). Albanische Etymologien: Untersuchungen zum albanischen Erbwortschatz. Leiden Studies in Indo-European (in German). Vol. 7. Amsterdam, Atlanta: Rodopi. ISBN 9789042001619.
- Dzino, Danijel (2008). "Strabo 7, 5 and imaginary Illyricum". Athenaeum. 96 (1). Edizioni New Press: 173–192.
- Elsie, Robert (1998). "Dendronymica Albanica: A survey of Albanian tree and shrub names" (PDF). Zeitschrift für Balkanologie (34): 163–200.
- Elsie, Robert (2015). The Tribes of Albania: History, Society and Culture. I.B.Tauris. ISBN 9780857739322.
- Eckstein, Arthur M. (2008). Rome Enters the Greek East From Anarchy to Hierarchy in the Hellenistic Mediterranean, 230–170 BC. Blackwell Publishing. ISBN 978-1-4051-6072-8.
- Errington, Robert Malcolm (1990). A History of Macedonia. Hellenistic culture and society. Vol. 5. Berkeley, CA: University of California Press. ISBN 0-520-06319-8.
- Falileyev, Alexander (2020). "The Silent Europe La Europa silenciosa". Palaeohispanica (20): 887–919. doi:10.36707/palaeohispanica.v0i20.372. ISSN 1578-5386. S2CID 230710587.
- Ferri, Naser (2006). "Simpoziumi ndërkombëtar mbi Dioklecianin dhe epokën e tij (i mbajtur në Split më 18-22 shtator 2005)" [International Symposium on Diocletian and his period (held in Split from 18–22 September 2005)]. In Drançolli, Jahja (ed.). Kosova Archeologica - Kosova Arkeologjike. Instituti Arkeologjik i Kosovës [Archaeological Institute of Kosova]. pp. 222–230.
- Hajdari, Arben; Berisha, Milot (2021). Ancient Dardania : Archaeological Exhibition. Ministry of Culture, Youth and Sports of Kosovo; National Museum of Kosovo. ISBN 978-9951-650-74-8.
- Hammond, Nicholas Geoffrey Lemprière (1966). "The Kingdoms in Illyria circa 400-167 B.C.". The Annual of the British School at Athens. 61. British School at Athens: 239–253. doi:10.1017/S0068245400019043. JSTOR 30103175. S2CID 164155370.
- Hammond, Nicholas Geoffrey Lemprière (1967). Epirus: the Geography, the Ancient Remains, the History and Topography of Epirus and Adjacent Areas. Clarendon Press. ISBN 0198142536.
- Hammond, Nicholas Geoffrey Lemprière (1988). A History of Macedonia: 336-167 B.C. Oxford University Press. ISBN 978-0-19-814815-9.
- Heckel, Waldemar (2006). Who's Who in the Age of Alexander the Great: Prosopography of Alexander's Empire. Wiley. ISBN 978-1-4051-1210-9.

Joseph, Brian D.; Dedvukaj, Lindon (2024). "Turning night into day: Milieu and semantic change in Albanian". Proceedings of the Linguistic Society of America. 9 (1). Linguistic Society of America: 5681. doi:10.3765/plsa.v9i1.5681.

- Lane Fox, R. (2011). "Philip of Macedon: Accession, Ambitions, and Self-Presentation". In Lane Fox, R. (ed.). Brill's Companion to Ancient Macedon: Studies in the Archaeology and History of Macedon, 650 BC – 300 AD. Leiden: Brill. pp. 335–366. ISBN 978-90-04-20650-2.
- Lewis, D. M.; Boardman, John (1994). The Cambridge Ancient History. Cambridge University Press. ISBN 978-0-521-23348-4.
- Lippert, Andreas; Matzinger, Joachim (2021). Die Illyrer: Geschichte, Archäologie und Sprache. Kohlhammer Verlag. ISBN 9783170377103.
- Matijašić, Ivan (2011). ""Shrieking like Illyrians": Historical geography and the Greek perspective of the Illyrian world in the 5th century BC". Arheološki Vestnik. 62. Research Centre of the Slovenian Academy of Sciences and Arts: 289–316.
- Mortensen, Kate (1991). "The Career of Bardylis". The Ancient World. Vol. 22. Ares Publishers. pp. 49–59.
- Orel, Vladimir (1998). Albanian etymological dictionary. Brill. ISBN 90-04-11024-0.
- Papazoglu, Fanula (1969). Srednjobalkanska plemena u predrimsko doba. Tribali, Autarijati, Dardanci, Skordisci i Mezi. Djela - Akademija nauka i umjetnosti Bosne i Hercegovine. Odjeljenje društvenih nauka (in Croatian). Vol. 30. Sarajevo: Akademija nauka i umjetnosti Bosne i Hercegovine.
- Papazoglu, Fanula (1978). The Central Balkan Tribes in pre-Roman Times: Triballi, Autariatae, Dardanians, Scordisci and Moesians. Amsterdam: Hakkert. ISBN 9789025607937.
- Petrović, Vladimir P. (2006). "Pre-roman and Roman Dardania historical and geographical considerations". Balcanica (37): 7–23. doi:10.2298/BALC0637007P. hdl:21.15107/rcub_dais_4231.
- Petrović, Vladimir P. (2019). Les voies et agglomérations romaines au cœur des Balkans: Le cas de la Serbie. Scripta Antiqua. Ausonius Éditions. ISBN 9782356133243.
- Rama, Zana (2021). "Dardania in late antiquity: An overview of 4th-6th century fortification in the territory of Kosovo". Archaeologia Adriatica. 14 (1). doi:10.15291/archeo.3392. S2CID 244293507.
- Rusakov, Alexander (2017). "Albanian". In Mate Kapović (ed.). The Indo-European Languages (2nd ed.). Routledge. ISBN 978-1-315-67855-9.
- Šašel Kos, Marjeta (2005). Appian and Illyricum. Narodni muzej Slovenije. ISBN 961616936X.
- Šašel Kos, Marjeta (2010). "Peoples on the northern fringes of the Greek world: Illyria as seen by Strabo". In Jean-Luc Lamboley, Maria Paola Castiglioni (ed.). L'Illyrie méridionale et l'Épire dans l'Antiquité V: Actes du Ve colloque international de Grenoble (8–11 octobre 2008). L'Illyrie méridionale et l'Épire dans l'Antiquité (V). Vol. 2. De Boccard Editions. pp. 617–629. ISBN 9782951943339.
- Savić, Danilo (2022). "Some Illyrian Ethnonyms and Their Supposed Albanian Cognates". Belgrade Linguistics Days. 1: 449–463. doi:10.18485/belida.2022.1.ch18. hdl:21.15107/rcub_dais_13349.
- Savić, M. M. (2015). "Material culture of Dardan's in pre-roman period". Baština (in Serbian) (39): 67–84.
- Shukriu, Edi (2008). "Prehistory and Antique History of Kosova" (PDF). Thesis Kosova. 1. Archived from the original (PDF) on 13 October 2022.
- Shukriu, Edi (1996). Dardania paraurbane: studime arkeologjike të Kosovës [Pre-urban Dardania: Archaeological Studies of Kosova]. Biblioteka "Fryma" (in Albanian). Vol. 13. Pejë: Dukagjini.
- Stipčević, Aleksandar (1989). Iliri: povijest, život, kultura [The Illyrians: history and culture] (in Croatian). Školska knjiga. ISBN 9788603991062.
- Gavrilović Vitas, Nadežda (2021). Ex Asia et Syria Oriental Religions in the Roman Central Balkans. Archaeopress Roman Archaeology. Vol. 78. Archaeopress Publishing LTD. ISBN 978-1-78969-914-2.
- Vranić, Ivan (2014a). "The "Hellenization" process and the Balkan Iron Age archaeology". In Staša Babić, Marko Jankovic (ed.). The Edges of the Roman World. Cambridge Scholars Publishing. pp. 33–47. ISBN 9781443861540.
- Vranić, Ivan (2014b). "'Hellenisation' and Ethnicity in the Continental Balkan Iron Age". In Popa, Catalin; Stoddart, Simon (eds.). Fingerprinting the Iron Age: Approaches to identity in the European Iron Age: Integrating South-Eastern Europe into the debate. Oxbow Books. ISBN 978-1782976783.
- Vujčić, Nemanja (2019). "The Army of Lysimachus after Corupedium". Živa Antika/Antiquité Vivante. 69 (1–2): 109–122. doi:10.47054/ZIVA19691-2109v. ISSN 0514-7727. S2CID 245589829.
- Vujčić, Nemanja (2021). "The City of Pelion and the Illyrian War of Alexander". Greek, Roman, and Byzantine Studies. 61.
- Wilkes, John (1996) [1992]. The Illyrians. Wiley. ISBN 978-0-631-19807-9.
- Wilkes, John (2012). "Dardani". In Hornblower, Simon; Spawforth, Antony; Eidinow, Esther (eds.). The Oxford Classical Dictionary. OUP Oxford. p. 414. ISBN 978-0-19-954556-8.
- Worthington, Ian (2023). The Last Kings of Macedonia and the Triumph of Rome. Oxford University Press. ISBN 978-0-19-752005-5.
- Zahariade, Mihail (2009). Ovidiu Țentea, Florian Matei-Popescu (ed.). The Thracians in the Roman Imperial Army: From the First to the Third Century A.D. The Center for Roman Military Studies. Vol. 1. Mega Publishing House.
- Zeqo, Moikom (2016). "Zef Mirdita, dijetari i madh shqiptar i formatit evropian". Studime Albanologjike. 13. Instituti i Trashëgimisë Shpirtërore e Kulturore të Shqiptarëve – Shkup: 13–20. ISSN 1857-6958.
