= Dardanian–Bastarnic war =

Part of the Macedonian Wars 179–175 BC

- Part of Macedonian Wars
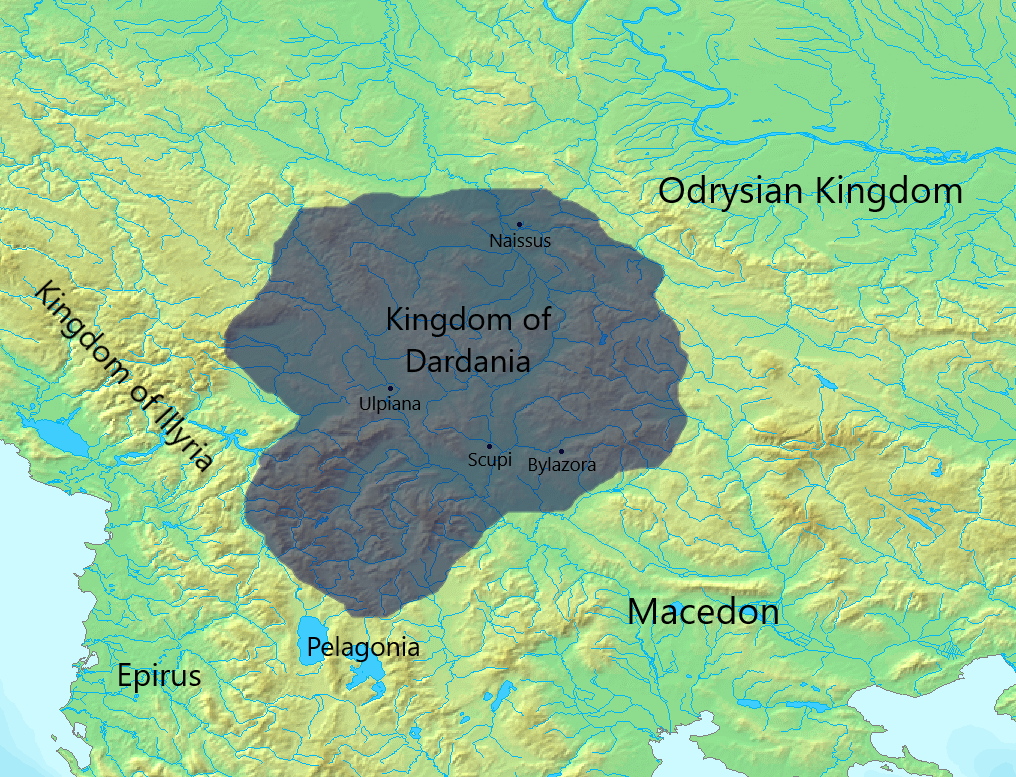
- Map of Dardanian Kingdom at its territorial peak
Date	179–175 BC
Location	Dardania
Result	Dardanian victory: Temporary occupation of Dardania; Bastarnae pushed out

Belligerents
Kingdom of Dardania	Bastarnae
	Supported by: Kingdom of Macedonia; Odrysian Kingdom; Scordisci

Commanders and leaders
Bato (179-176 BC); Monunius II (176-175 BC)	Clondicus (Bastarnae chieftain); Philip V of Macedon (179 BC); Perseus of Macedon (179-175 BC)

Units involved
1st Dardanian group 2nd Dardanian group	Bastarnae army

Strength
Unknown	Approximately 30,000 Bastarnae

Casualties and losses
Unknown	Unknown

The Dardanian–Bastarnic war was a military conflict between the Kingdom of Dardania and the Bastarnae tribe.

== History ==
Philip V of Macedon planned to use the Bastarnae as a base to attack the Romans, but that required the Macedonians to settle in Dardania, along with their families, affecting the Dardanians as a people group. This would destroy long-time enemies of the Macedonian state and secure a path to Rome. Some twenty years before, Philip had lost a war against the Roman Republic, known as the Second Macedonian War. However, war was again threatened.

The Dardanians used every opportunity to loot Macedonia, and Philip's army was too weak at the time to attack them.

In 179 BC Philip died, just after the Bastarnae left their homeland. When they heard the news about Philip's death, the Bastarnae began moving through the Odrysian Kingdom. The Thracians felt that after the king's death, they were no longer under obligation to help and supply these barbarians. The Bastarnae started looting Odrysia in search for food. The Thracians made up an army, but they were weaker than the Bastarnae. The Bastarnae beat them and made them evacuate to hills and mountains. Thracian soldiers and families moved to Thracia's highest peak, Mt. Musala. The Bastarnae chased them, but when they reached the mountains, a heavy storm hit them and they retreated.

== War ==
Some 30,000 Bastarnae started moving to Dardania, while others returned home. They reached Dardania in autumn of 179 BC.

The Bastarnae formed several camps. The Dardanians thought they were going to vanquish the enemy easily, but years passed and attackers were still there. In 176 BC Dardanian king Monunius II sent a delegation to Rome, accusing Macedonian king Perseus of invading the Bastarnae. Perseus wanted good relations with the Roman Republic, so he denied all accusations.

The Dardanians waited to attack until the Bastarnae's allies, the Scordisci and the Thracians, went home for the winter; either in late 176 BC, or the early winter of 175–174 BC. They split into two groups; one to attack from the front, and the other from the rear via a remote pass. The first group was defeated; the Bastarnae pushed them and besieged them in their city. The second Dardanian group seized the enemy camp, which was left unguarded, and probably took the Bastarnian women and children as hostages; this would have pressured the Bastarnae to leave Dardania in exchange for the members of their families.

== Aftermath ==
In early 174 BC, the Bastarnae recruited an innumerable force, but as it was crossing the frozen river of the Danube with the intent to raid Dardania, the ice broke and most of them perished. Some scholars, such as Fanula Papazoglu, have conflated this incident recorded by Orosius, with the preceding war recorded by Livy; while others, such as N. G. L. Hammond, are against this approach, having argued that "the circumstances are so different from those of the (assumed) withdrawal of the Bastamae from Dardania in Livy that the two movements should not be telescoped into one."

The Dardanians won the war, but they were heavily damaged and reduced in power. Dardania continued to exist until Roman conquest in 28 BC.

== See also ==
- Invasion of Molossia
