= Plator =

Brother of Illyrian king (died 169 BC)

Plator (? –169 BC) the Illyrian was brother to King Gentius, the last Illyrian king of the Ardiaean State.

Plator may have been killed because he wanted to marry Etuta in 169 BC. She was the daughter of Monunius and was married to Gentius himself.

The personal name Plator was very common among Illyrians, attested among the southern Illyrians, Delmatae, and Pannoni; sometimes in lands north of the Delmatae it was also spelled Pletor. The name is also found in derivatives such as Platino and Platoris. Among the Liburnians the name is found as Plaetor; among the Veneti as Plaetorius. The gens name Plaetorius is also found among the Romans, and a Gaius Plaetorius was one of the three ambassadors sent to King Gentius on behalf of Rome's allies.
