= Kingdom of Dardania =

Ancient state in the Balkans

Kingdom of Dardania Regnum Dardaniae
- 4th century BC–28 BC
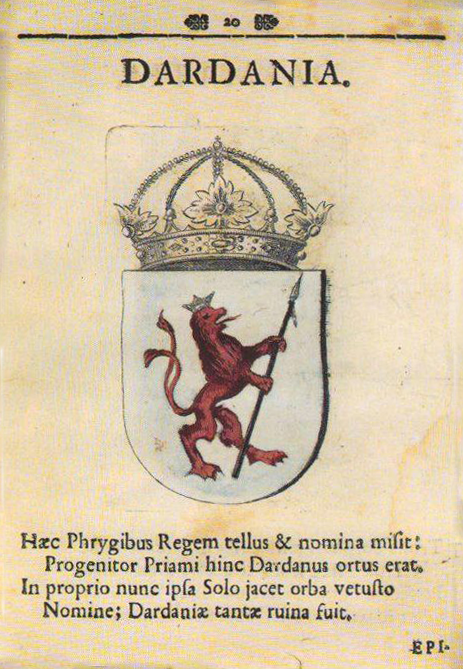
- Coat of arms

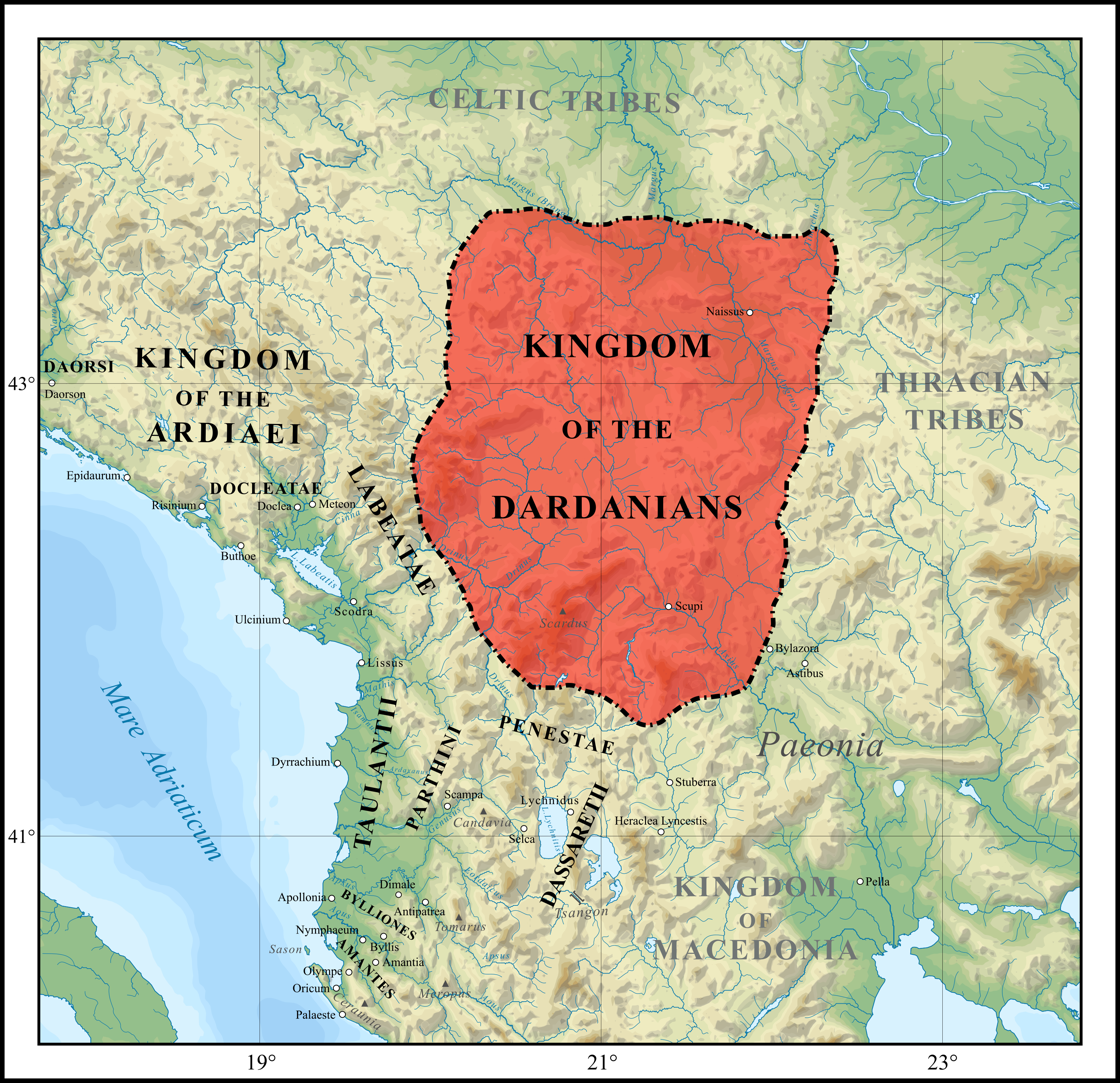
- Approximate extent of the Kingdom of the Dardanians, late 3rd century BC, prior to their conquest of Paeonia.
- Religion: Dardanian Polytheism
- Demonyms: Dardanian, Dardani
- Government: Monarchy
- King
  - c. 231 – c. 206 BC: Longarus
  - c. 206 BC – c. 176 BC: Bato
  - c. 176 – c. 167 BC: Monunius
- Historical era: Classical antiquity
  - Founded: 4th century BC
  - Roman conquest: 28 BC
Succeeded by
Roman Republic
- Today part of: Kosovo; Albania; North Macedonia; Serbia; Montenegro

The Kingdom of Dardania (Latin: Regnum Dardaniae) was a polity in the central Balkans in the region of Dardania during classical antiquity. It is named after the Dardani, a Paleo-Balkan tribe that formed the core of the Dardanian polity. Dardania was centered around present-day Kosovo, but also included parts of North Macedonia (Skopje and northwestern area), Serbia (Naissus) and Albania (Kukës, Tropoja, Has). The eastern parts of Dardania were at the Thraco-Illyrian contact zone. Marcus Licinius Crassus, grandson of the triumvir Marcus Crassus, officially annexed the kingdom in 28 BC while on campaign against the Dacians and Bastarnae. The region was subsequently incorporated into the province of Moesia in 15 BC, and later in 293 AD, as the province of Dardania.

== History ==
Tribal aristocracy and pre-urban development first emerged in Dardania from the 6th–5th centuries BC. This proto-urban development was followed by the creation of urban centers and the emergence of craftsmanship, and a Dardanian polity began to develop from the fourth century. Moreover, Dardani contact with the Mediterranean world began early and intensified during the Iron Age. Trade connections with the Ancient Greek world developed from the seventh century onwards. Material culture and accounts in classical sources suggest that Dardanian society reached an advanced phase of development.

The first written references to the Dardani are as opponents of Macedon in the fourth century, clashing with Philip II who managed to subdue them and their neighbors in 345. However, Philip took no new territory and ended Macedon's borders near the Danube watershed in Paeonia. The Dardani then remained quiet until Philip's assassination in 336, after which they began planning to revolt alongside the Illyrians and the Thracians. The first century historian Pompey Trogue reports that these barbarous nations...were of wavering faith and perfidious dispositions and that only Alexander III's smooth succession averted disaster. Indeed, the Dardani are not mentioned in any ancient accounts of Alexander's Balkan campaign in 335. They remain absent from our sources until 284 when Lysimachus seized Paeonia, which had revolted earlier in 322, forcing her prince Ariston to flee to Dardania. It appears that the Dardani escaped the Macedonian yoke entirely during the Wars of the Diadochi as they again began to freely raid Upper Greece under the reign of Lysimachus. Thereafter the Dardani became a constant threat to Macedonia's northern borders.

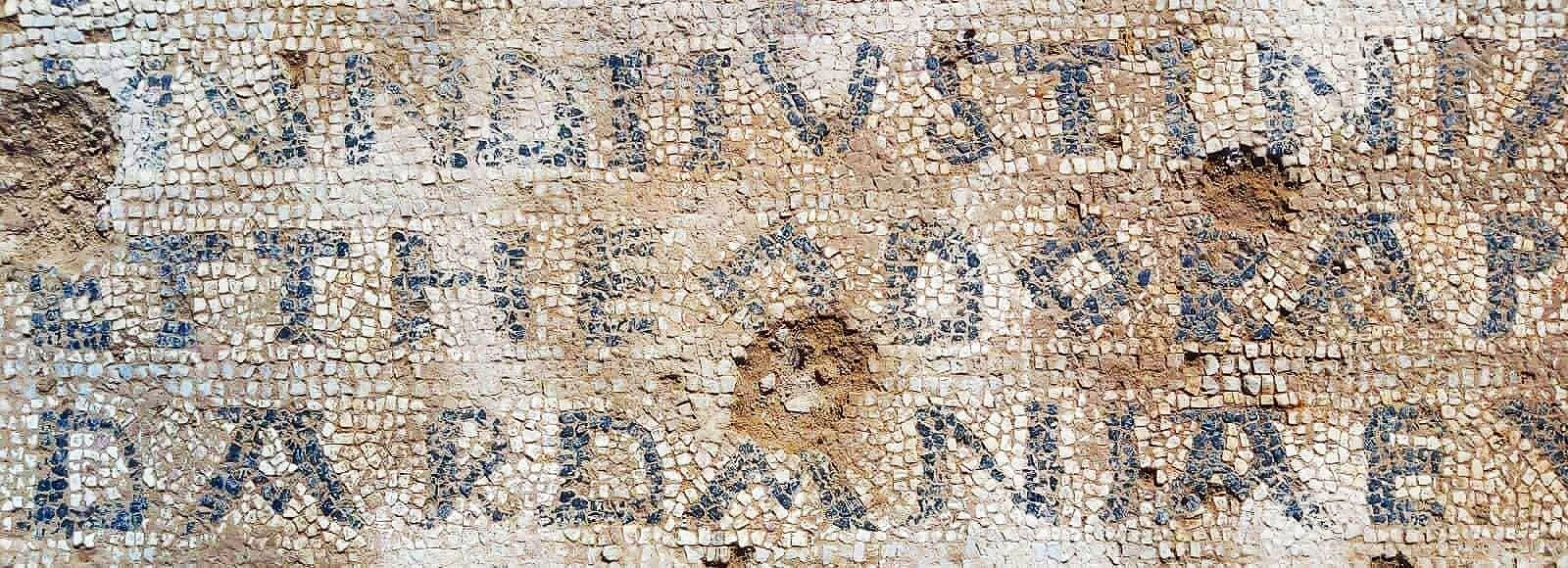
Mosaic dedicated to Emperor. Justinian the Great. Unearthed in 2023 in Ulpiana,Kosovo

In 279, during a Celtic incursion of the Balkans, Dardania itself began to be raided by several tribes on their way to plunder Greece. In that same year an unnamed Dardanian king offered 20,000 warriors to the Macedonian king Ptolemy Ceraunus to stop the invading Celts. Ptolemy found this offer insulting and rudely refused the embassy by saying that

the Macedonians were in a sad condition if, after having subdued the whole east without assistance, they now required aid from the Dardanians to defend their country; and that he had for soldiers the sons of those who had served under Alexander the Great, and had been victorious throughout the world.

Underestimating the Celtic strength, Ptolemy was later captured in battle and subsequently decapitated by their Gallic leader Bolgios. The tribes then pushed on towards Southern Greece, but were permanently turned back at Delphi by the Greeks. The remainder withdrew north through Dardania where they were, according to Diodorous, subsequently destroyed by the Dardani. They then disappear from the written historical record until the 230s BC when a constant series of wars, raids, and counter-raids began against the Macedonians.

Following the Celtic invasion, and the consequent diminishment in power of the Macedonians, the influence of Dardania began to grow in the region. In 230, the Dardani under Longarus captured the strategic city of Bylazora in Paeonia. At some point in 230–229 in an unknown location in north-west Macedonia, they defeated the Antigonid king Demetrius II who died shortly the next spring. The Dardanian expansion into Macedonia, similar to the Ardiaean expansion into Epirus in the same period, may have been part of a broader movement among the Illyrian peoples.

Groups of Illyrians began to desert the Ardiaen queen Teuta at around the same time and join the Dardani, forcing her to end an expedition into Phoenice. When Philip V rose to the Macedonian throne, skirmishing with Dardania began in 220-219 and he managed to recapture Bylazora from them in 217. Skirmishes continued in 211 and in 209 when a force of Dardani under Aeropus, probably a pretender to the Macedonian throne, captured Lychnidus and looted Macedonia taking 20.000 prisoners and retreating before Philip's forces could reach them.

In 201, Bato of Dardania (along with Pleuratus III the Illyrian and Amynander of Athamania) cooperated with Roman consul Sulpicius Galba Maximus in his expedition against Philip V. Always being under the menace of Dardanian attacks on Macedonia, Philip V made an alliance with the Bastarnae at around 183 and invited them to settle in Polog, the region of Dardania closest to Macedonia. A joint campaign of the Bastarnae and Macedonians against the Dardanians was organized, but Philip V died and his son Perseus of Macedon withdrew his forces from the campaign. The Bastarnae crossed the Danube in huge numbers and although they didn't meet the Macedonians, they continued the campaign. Some 30,000 Bastarnae under the command of Clondicus seem to have defeated the Dardani. In 179, the Bastarnae conquered the Dardani, who later in 174 pushed them out, in a war which proved catastrophic, with a few years later, in 170, the Macedonians defeating the Dardani. Macedonia and Illyria became protectorates of the Roman Republic in 168. The Dardanian Kingdom retained its sovereignty until 28 BC, when the Roman Empire under Augustus conquered the region.

The Romans created the province of Moesia from parts of Dardania, but later made it a separate province called Dardania.

== Geography ==
Identified places and settlements in Kosovo.

=== Sites in Kosovo ===
#	Settlement (Note: Italics: the ancient names are unattested.)	Description	Location	Geographic coordinates	Ref.
1	Municipium Dardanorum		Soqanicë	43°3′17″N 20°48′36″E	
2	Romajë		Romajë	42°17′31″N 20°35′34″E	
3	Busavatë		Busavatë	42°34′49″N 21°32′36″E	
4	Ulpiana		Ulpiana	42°35′47″N 21°10′31″E	
5	Vindenis		Gllamnik	42°51′58″N 21°10′59″E	
6	Vlashnjë		Vlashnjë	42°12′09″N 20°39′45″E	
7	Topanicë		Topanicë	42°31′25″N 21°38′23″E	
8	Duboc		Dubovc	42°46′37″N 20°54′37″E	
9	Dardana Fortress		Kamenica	42°35′33″N 21°33′49″E	

== Culture ==
The eastern parts of the region were at the Thraco-Illyrian contact zone. In archaeological research, Illyrian names are predominant in western Dardania (present-day Kosovo), while Thracian names are mostly found in eastern Dardania (present-day south-eastern Serbia). Thracian names are absent in western Dardania; some Illyrian names appear in the eastern parts. The correspondence of Illyrian names, including those of the ruling elite, in Dardania with those of the southern Illyrians suggests a "thracianization" of parts of Dardania. Strabo in his geographica mentions them as one of the three strongest Illyrian peoples, the other two being the Ardiaei and Autariatae.

== Dardanian rulers ==
- Unnamed Dardanian king (early 3rd century BC), who offered the Macedonian king Ptolemy Ceraunos 20,000 soldiers to counteract the invading Celts, but Ceraunos declined the offer.
- Longarus;
  - Bato
  - Monunius II

According to a historical reconstruction the first attested Dardanian king was Bardylis, who during the expansion of his dominion included the region of Dassaretis in his realm, but this is considered an old fallacy because it is unsupported by any ancient source, while some facts and ancient geographical locations go squarely against it. Most scholars hold that the Illyrian kingdom that was established by Bardylis was centered along Lake Ohrid and east to the Prespa Lakes, which was called Dassaretis later in Roman times, located on the border between Macedon and Epirus.

== See also ==
- Dardani
- History of Kosovo
- History of Skopje

== Bibliography ==
- Alaj, Premtim (2019). Les habitats de l'Age du fer sur le territoire de l'actuel Kosovo (Thesis). Université de Lyon.
- Cabanes, Pierre (2002) [1988]. Dinko Čutura; Bruna Kuntić-Makvić (eds.). Iliri od Bardileja do Gencia (IV. – II. stoljeće prije Krista) [The Illyrians from Bardylis to Gentius (4th – 2nd century BC)] (in Croatian). Translated by Vesna Lisičić. Svitava. ISBN 953-98832-0-2.
- Castiglioni, Maria Paola (2010). Cadmos-serpent en Illyrie: itinéraire d'un héros civilisateur. Edizioni Plus. ISBN 978-88-8492-742-2.
- Eckstein, Arthur M. (2008). Rome Enters the Greek East From Anarchy to Hierarchy in the Hellenistic Mediterranean, 230–170 BC. Blackwell Publishing. ISBN 978-1-4051-6072-8.
- Errington, Robert Malcolm (1990). A History of Macedonia. University of California Press. ISBN 978-0-520-06319-8.
- Gavrilović Vitas, Nadežda (2021). Ex Asia et Syria Oriental Religions in the Roman Central Balkans. Archaeopress Roman Archaeology. Vol. 78. Archaeopress Publishing LTD. ISBN 978-1-78969-914-2.
- Lane Fox, R. (2011). "Philip of Macedon: Accession, Ambitions, and Self-Presentation". In Lane Fox, R. (ed.). Brill's Companion to Ancient Macedon: Studies in the Archaeology and History of Macedon, 650 BC – 300 AD. Leiden: Brill. pp. 335–366. ISBN 978-90-04-20650-2.
- Mesihović, Salmedin; Šačić, Amra (2015). Historija Ilira [History of Illyrians] (in Bosnian). Sarajevo: Univerzitet u Sarajevu [University of Sarajevo]. ISBN 978-9958-600-65-4.
- Mortensen, Kate (1991). "The Career of Bardylis". The Ancient World. Vol. 22. Ares Publishers. pp. 49–59.
- Papazoglu, Fanula (1978). The Central Balkan Tribes in pre-Roman Times: Triballi, Autariatae, Dardanians, Scordisci and Moesians. Amsterdam: Hakkert. ISBN 978-90-256-0793-7.
- Petrović, Vladimir (2007). "Pre-Roman and Roman Dardania: Historical and Geographical Considerations" (PDF). BALCANICA - Annual of the Institute for Balkan Studies. XXXVII. Archived from the original (PDF) on 2021-10-15.
- Parisot, Pierrick (2015). Le contrôle de l'espace européen par les rois de Macédoine, des origines à la fin de la monarchie (VIe siècle av. J.-C.–168 av. J.-C.) (Thesis) (in French). Université de Lorraine.
- Šašel Kos, Marjeta (2002). "Pyrrhus and Illyrian Kingdom(s?)". Greek Influence Along the East Adriatic Coast. Knjiga Mediterana. 26: 101–119. ISBN 953-163-154-9.
- Stipčević, Aleksandar (1977). The Illyrians: history and culture. Noyes Press. ISBN 978-0-8155-5052-5.
- Šašel Kos, Marjeta (2010). "Peoples on the northern fringes of the Greek world: Illyria as seen by Strabo". In Jean-Luc Lamboley, Maria Paola Castiglioni (ed.). L'Illyrie méridionale et l'Épire dans l'Antiquité V: Actes du Ve colloque international de Grenoble (8–11 octobre 2008). L'Illyrie méridionale et l'Épire dans l'Antiquité (V). Vol. 2. De Boccard Editions. pp. 617–629. ISBN 978-2-9519433-3-9.
- Schermer, Shirley; Shukriu, Edi; Deskaj, Sylvia (2011). Marquez-Grant, Nicholas; Fibiger, Linda (eds.). The Routledge Handbook of Archaeological Human Remains and Legislation: An International Guide to Laws and Practice in the Excavation and Treatment of Archaeological Human Remains. Taylor & Francis. ISBN 978-1-136-87956-2.
- Shukriu, Edi (2008). "Prehistory and Antique History of Kosova" (PDF). Thesis Kosova. 1. Archived from the original (PDF) on 2022-10-13.
- Toynbee, Arnold Joseph (1969). Some problems of Greek history. Oxford University Press. ISBN 978-0-19-215249-7.
- Vujčić, Nemanja (2021). "The City of Pelion and the Illyrian War of Alexander". Greek, Roman, and Byzantine Studies. 61.
- Wilkes, J. J. (1992). The Illyrians. Blackwell. ISBN 0-631-19807-5.
- Wilkes, John (2012). "Dardani". In Hornblower, Simon; Spawforth, Antony; Eidinow, Esther (eds.). The Oxford Classical Dictionary. OUP Oxford. p. 414. ISBN 978-0-19-954556-8.
