= Longarus =

3rd-century BCE Illyrian king of the Dardanians

- Reign: c. 231 – c. 206 BC
- Predecessor: Magarus
- Successor: Bato of Dardania

Longarus (ruled c. 231 – 206 BC) was an Illyrian king of the Dardanian Kingdom. Longarus was at war with various Macedonian kings and managed to conquer at different times part of Macedonia. Longarus was an ally of the Paeonian State and liberated the Paeonians in order to open the routes towards Macedonia. Longarus' influence grew and many other Illyrians from the Ardiaean Kingdom joined him.

== Military activities ==
After the Gallic invasions of Dardania, the Dardanians were not heard of for four decades; probably as they were in the process of recovering from the consequences of the Gallic invasions. During that time, the Dardanian State grew stronger and extended its borders in the south and in the north. During the second half of the 3rd century BC, the Illyrian-Macedonian Wars continued because of the desire for territorial expansion by the Macedonian kings against the Dardanians, particularly against Paeonia. The Paeonians had continually rebelled against the Macedonians and entered into anti-Macedonian alliances to maintain their independence. An old alliance (rather than competitiveness) had existed between these two Illyrian states, because every time the Paeonians won their independence, the Dardanians gained an open road into Macedonia.

Even before Longarus, the Dardanians had been a constant threat to the Macedonian kingdom. In 231 BC, under Longarus, they captured the Paeonian capital, Bylazora, and freed the Paeonians and in an important battle in 229 BC, Longarus attacked and defeated the Macedonian forces under Demetrius II of Macedon, disapproving of his attempts to extend Macedon's northern borders. The Macedonians attacked Longarus with large forces. In that period, Longarus made attempts to strengthen his state's position in the heart of the Balkans against neighbouring peoples. In 229 BC, Longarus, profiting from the fact that the Ardiaean Kingdom under Teuta was dealing with campaigns in Epirus, invaded its northern borders. Longarus' influence on the region grew stronger and some other Illyrian tribes from the Ardiaean Kingdom joined the Dardanians under Longarus, forcing Teuta to call off her expeditions into Epirus. Scerdilaidas was sent north to force Longarus' army to return to Dardania.

Antigonus Doson claimed a victory over Longarus after the death of Demetrius. Part of the Paeonian state was annexed to Macedonia and Antigoneia was founded on the river Axius, the main invasion route from the north. The Dardanians were driven out of all the lands they conquered from Demetrius II and the city of Bylazora was garrisoned. While Doson was dealing with a war in Greece in 222 BC, he hastened back home within a few days when news came that Longarus had invaded and that his forces were looting his kingdom. Doson found the Dardanians still in the country and forced them to do battle, which he won but it was reported that he so over-exerted himself in shouting encouragement to his troops that he burst a blood-vessel and fell fatally ill.

Longarus despised the youth of Philip V and constantly provoked him. Longarus did not agree with the situation created in Paeonia or Macedonia's claim to it. When Philip V rose to the Macedonian throne, skirmishing with the Dardanians began in 220–219 BC. In 219 BC when Philip was in the Peloponnese, Longarus freed Paeonia and their capital, Bylazora, but Philip captured Bylazora from them in 217 BC. Philip conquered the Dardanian city of Sintia, somewhere south-east of Skopje, in 211 BC and the northern area of Pelagonia. A force of Dardanians under Aeropus, probably a pretender to the Macedonian throne, captured Lychnidus. While Aeropus' military incursion was limited and satisfied with Lychnidus, in 208 BC, Longarus attacked upper Macedonia, occupying the region of Orestida, taking 20,000 prisoners, and reaching the plain of Argestes. This was done when Longarus allied himself with the enemies of Macedonia, Rome, Scerdilaidas and Epirus. In 206 BC, Philip continued the war with Longarus in order to drive them from the Dardanian-occupied areas.

Longarus succeeded in making the Dardanian state into a military power that threatened Macedonia. It was up to his two sons, Bato and Monunius, to follow in his footsteps. Longarus was succeeded by Bato around 206 BC.

== See also ==
- Dardania
- Illyrian warfare
- List of rulers of Illyria
