= Gentius =

Illyrian King

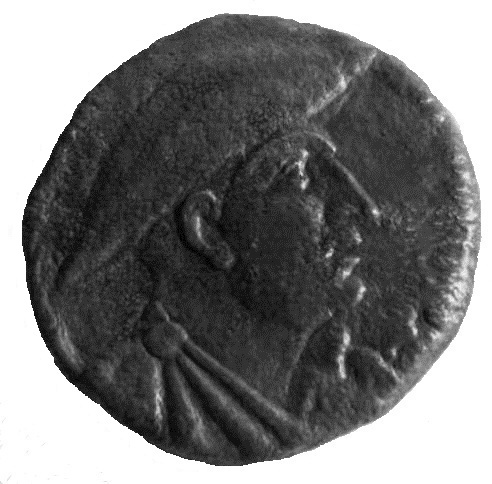
- Coin of Gentius
- Reign: 181–168 BC
- Predecessor: Pleuratus III
- Successor: Ballaios (probable)
- Died: after 167 BC; Italy
- Consort: Etuta
- Dynasty: Labeatai
- Father: Pleuratus

Gentius (Ancient Greek: Γένθιος, Génthios; fl. 181–168 BC) was an Illyrian king who belonged to the Labeatan dynasty. He ruled in 181–168 BC, being the last attested Illyrian king. He was the son of Pleuratus III, a king who kept positive relations with Rome. The capital city of the Illyrian kingdom under Gentius was Scodra, now Shkodër, Albania.

In 180 BC, during his early reign, the Dalmatae and Daorsi declared themselves independent from his rule and the city of Rhizon abandoned him prior to his defeat, receiving immunity from the Romans. He married Etuta, the daughter of the Dardanian king Monunius II.

In 171 BC, Gentius was allied with the Romans against the Macedonians, but in 169 BC he changed sides and allied himself with Perseus of Macedon. The southernmost city of the Illyrian kingdom was Lissus (now Lezhë, Albania), a situation established since the First Illyrian War. He arrested two Roman legati, accusing them of not coming as emissaries but as spies. Gentius destroyed the cities of Apollonia and Epidamnos (Roman Dyrrachium, now Durrës, Albania), which were allied with Rome. In 168 BC, he was defeated at Scodra by a Roman force under L. Anicius Gallus, in only twenty or thirty days, and in 167 brought to Rome as a captive to participate in Gallus's triumph, after which he was interned in Iguvium. The date of his death is unknown. After his defeat, the Romans split the region into three administrative divisions, called meris. The extent of the first meris is not known, while the second was Labeates, and the third was Acruvium, Rhizon, Olcinium and their environs.

== Name ==
The Illyrian name Gentius appears to derive from PIE *ǵenh₁- "to beget", cognate to Latin gens, gentis "kin, clan, race". It must reflect the reconstructed noun *gent(i)yos, designating the king as the head of his kin, like the Proto-Germanic *kun-ing-az. It could very likely be the source of the Albanian name Gjin, which if this theory is correct, mutated and got christianized.

== Biography ==
=== Relations with Rome ===
By 181 BC the loyal Pleuratus had been succeeded by his son Gentius. During his reign relations with the Ardiaean state and Rome started to dwindle. The coast and hinterland south of the Drin remained under Roman control since the First Illyrian Wars against Teuta. Gentius moved to increase power over kindred peoples living to the north and west. Among the islands the Greek city of Issa (now Vis, Croatia) had retained some form of independence under Roman protection but Pharos (now Hvar, Croatia) remained an Illyrian possession. On the mainland the Delmatae and the Daorsi were at one time subjects, but the former defected soon after the accession of Gentius. Illyrian strength lay in the navy and ships and it was their interference with Adriatic shipping which once more aroused Roman interest in the area. In 180 BC a Roman praetor responsible for coastal protection arrived in Brudisium with some ships of Gentius said to have been caught in the act of piracy. An embassy to Illyria failed to locate the king; but the praetor discovered that Romans were held for ransom at Korčula. No outcome of the affair is reported and it may well be that the Senate accepted a claim by Gentius' envoys that the charges were false. Ten years later, when Rome was gripped with war-fever against Perseus of Macedon, Issa accused Gentius of plotting war with the king and now the Illyrian envoys were denied a hearing before the Senate. Instead the Romans seized 54 Illyrian lembi at anchor in the harbour of Epidamnos. On the eve of war a Roman senator was sent to Illyria to remind Gentius of his formal friendship with the Roman Republic.

=== Alliance with the Dardani and Macedon ===
In 169 BC Gentius arranged the murder of his brother Plator killed because his plan to marry Etuta, daughter of the Dardanian king Monunius II, would have made him too powerful. Gentius then married Plator's fiancée for himself, securing the alliance of the powerful Dardani.

Perseus of Macedon having recaptured several Roman outposts in Roman occupied Illyria controlled the route leading west to the Ardiaean state. At this point Perseus sent his first embassy to Gentius, consisting of the Illyrian exile Pleuratus and the Macedonian Adaeus and Beroea. They found Gentius at Lissos and informed him of Perseus' successes against the Romans and Dardani and the recent victory over the Penestae. The Illyrians replied that he lacked not the will to fight the Romans but the money. No promises were made on this point either by this embassy or another sent from Stuberra shortly afterwards. Perseus continued his efforts to involve Gentius in the war, preferably it was said, at no cost to his treasury. The Illyrian exile Plearatus raised 1,000 infantry and 200 cavalry from the Penestae. The Roman invasion of Macedonia in 168 BC forced the king to promise a subsidy to Gentius, whose ships might be employed to attack the Romans. A sum of 300 talents was mentioned and Perseus sent his companion Pantauchus to make the arrangements. In the city of Meteon (now Medun, Montenegro) hostages were agreed and Gentius accepted the oath of the king. He sent Olympio with a delegation to Perseus to collect the money, and the treaty was concluded with some ceremony at Dium on the Thermaic Gulf. A formal parade of the Macedonian cavalry was held which may have impressed the Illyrians and the cavalry may have represented the Macedonians in the ratification of the treaty.

The 300 talents were counted out of the royal treasure at Pella and the Illyrians were permitted to mark it with their own stamp. An advance of ten talents was forwarded to Gentius and when this was passed over by Pantauchus the king was urged to commence hostilities against the Romans. When Gentius imprisoned two Roman envoys sent by Appius Claudius at Lychnidus, Perseus recalled the rest of the subsidy in belief that Gentius was now his ally, come what may.

=== Rise to power ===
Gentius accompanied the new anti-Roman orientation in Illyrian foreign policy with a series of measures to strengthen his state. First, he concentrated the finances by establishing a single tax over all the subjects and by taking royal control of the monetary workshops or mints of Lissus and Scodra, the two cities where he resided. At this time Gentius was issuing bronze coins. In the Selcë hoard there are two coins of Gentius with Macedonian emblems. The other coins of Gentius have what is probably his head with a cap not unlike the petasos, and a torque around his head, and on the reverse in one case a thunderbolt and in the others a warship, the lembi. Thus, according to an inventory made by the Romans, the state treasury had 27 pounds of gold, 19 of silver, 120,000 Illyrian drachmas and 13,000 Roman denarii on the eve of the war with Rome.

Gentius and Perseus sent a joint embassy to invite Rhodes in the war against Rome. Gentius also built up a fleet of 270 lembi, showing that he awaited an enemy in the Adriatic. His army numbered 15,000 men. Gentius was now prepared to go to war with Rome.

=== Third Illyrian War ===
In January/February 168 BC Gentius, having mustered his force of 15,000 men and fleet of lembi at Lissus, the southernmost city of his state, advanced into Roman territory and laid siege to the Illyrian city of Bassania, a Roman ally which refused to yield although it was only 5 miles from Lissus. His half-brother Caravantius, detaching 1,000 infantry and 50 horsemen, attacked the Cavii, failing to capture one of their cities while ravaging the fields of the city of Caravandis. A flotilla of eight lembi set off a little later to attack the coastal colonial cities of Epidamno and Appolonia. Meanwhile, the Romans under Appius Claudius had heard of the alliance that Gentius made with Perseus of Macedonia and the arrest of the Roman envoys. He therefore moved his army out of their winter quarters at Nymphaeum, added to it with troops from Byllis, Epidamnos and Appolonia as he marched north, and encamped by the river Genesus (Shkumbin, Albania). There he met with the new Roman commander, Lucius Anicius Gallus, a praetor. Anicius had crossed over from Italy to Appolonia with two legions, comprising 600 cavalry and 10,400 infantry, and 800 cavalry and 10,000 infantry from the Italian allies. His fleet, whose size is not known, was strengthened by a draft of 5,000 sailors. To this imposing force he added 200 cavalry and 2,000 infantry of the Parthini, an Illyrian koinon allied to the Romans. These combined forces outnumbered those of Gentius by two to one.

As a folio of Livy's text is missing, little is known of this campaign. It seems that Anicius's fleet engaged the Illyrians at sea and captured a number of their lembi. Next, they defeated the Illyrians on land, allowing them to advance into the heart of Illyrian territory. Once there, they secured the surrender of enemy cities mostly through negotiation rather than direct assault. Gentius concentrated his remaining forces near his capital Shkodra, a well-fortified city situated in a strong natural position. When Anicius approached with his army in battle formation, the Illyrians fled into the city in panic. Gentius asked for, and was given, a three-day truce hoping that Caravantius would come at any moment with a large relieving army: but that it did not happen. After his defeat, Gentius sent two envoys from among the prominent tribal leaders, Teuticus and Bellus, to negotiate with the Roman commander. On the third day of the truce, Gentius came to the Roman camp and surrendered to Anicius who gave him a dinner with full honours and then put him under arrest. The Illyrians in Shkodra surrendered and released the Roman envoys. The Roman army marched north of Scutari Lake where, at Meteon (present day Medun, Montenegro), they captured Gentius's queen Teuta, his brother Caravantius and his sons Scerdilaides and Pleuratus along with other leading Illyrians.

The fall of the Ardiaean State is transmitted by Livy in a ceremonial manner of the triumph of Anicius in Rome:

In a few days, both on land and sea did he defeat the brave Illyrian tribe, who had relied on their knowledge of their own territory and fortifications

This part of the campaign had only lasted thirty days. There were certainly further operations in the northern part of the Ardiaean State for Anicius placed garrisons in some towns, citadels and fortresses. These include the cities of Issa, Rhizon and Olcinium and the tribal states of the Daorsi and the Pirustae. Some came over to Rome on their own accord while other places such as Pharos were reduced by force and their property looted.

=== Aftermath ===
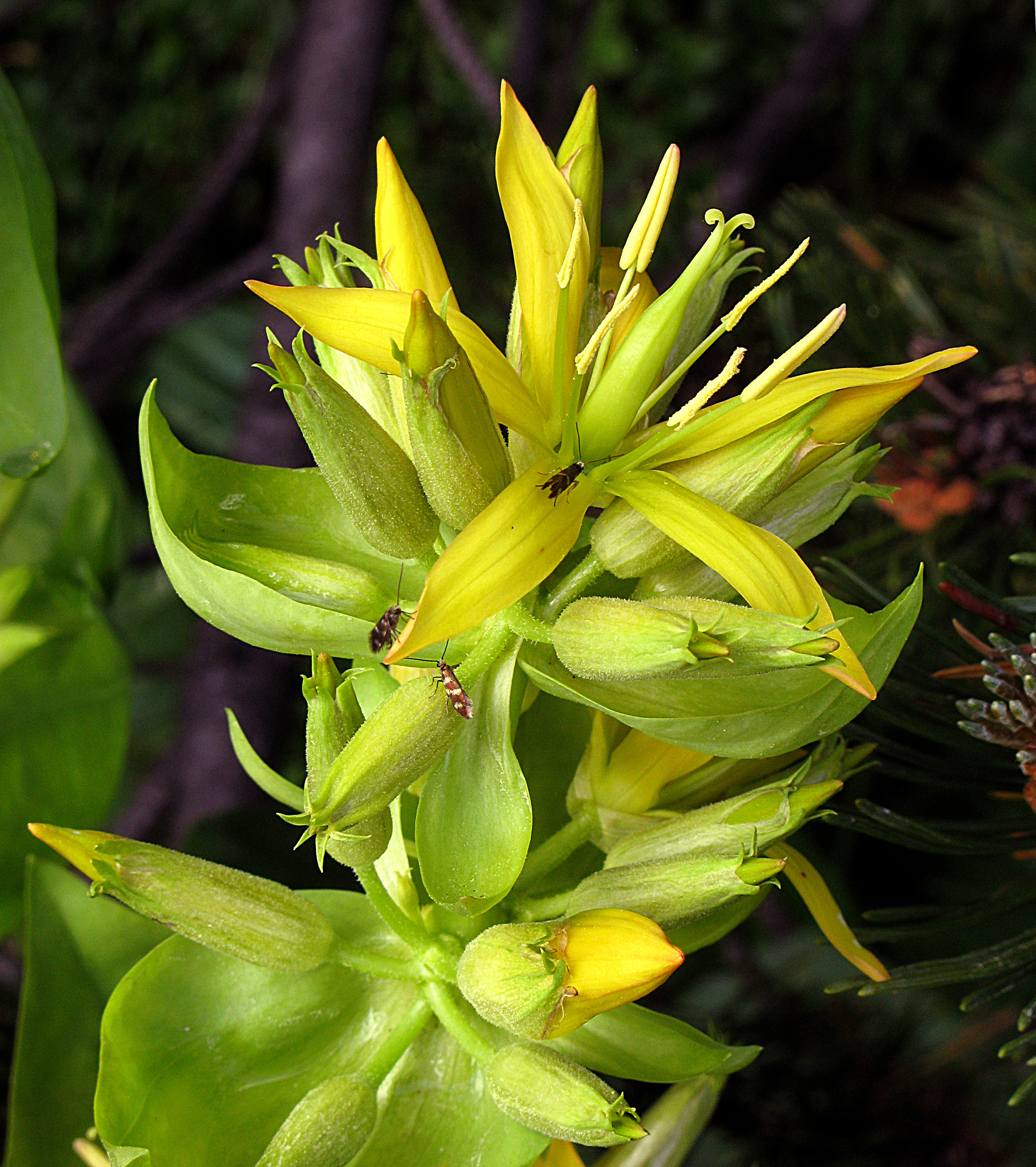
The genus name Gentiana was named after Gentius as a tribute to him, as he may have been the discoverer of tonic properties of Gentiana lutea.

Rome's triumph included the capture of many royal flags, other booty, the furniture of the king himself and the treasure mentioned above. Millions of sectercii were gained from the sale of the booty, in addition to the gold and silver that went to the state treasury.

By decision of the Senate, Gentius and his family were sent to Spoletum, to be kept under observation. The other captives were imprisoned in Rome. But the inhabitants of Spoletum refused to keep the royal family under watch, so they were transferred to Iguvium. The booty seized in Illyria included 220 vessels. By decree of the Senate, C. Cassius Longinus gave these vessels taken from Gentius to the inhabitants of Corcyra, Appolonia and Epidamnus. The year of Gentius' death is not known but there are ruins of what is perhaps his tomb.

The Roman punishment of Illyria spared only those koina that had backed Rome openly in the war. Those who had been enemies, their cities, buildings and public institutions were burned and thoroughly looted. Those spared retained their previous manner of administration, with officials elected every year, and paid Rome only half the taxes that they had previously paid to Gentius. The federation-based koina were dissolved and each unit was recognized as a separate koinon, enjoying local autonomy and often the right to mint its own coins.

While the southern Illyrian lands had been conquered once and for all, the Roman legions continued for about another hundred years with attempts to conquer the northern and eastern territories.

== Probable continuance ==
The archaeologist Hasan Ceka has hypothesized that the name of one of the envoys of Gentius, Bellus might have been an incorrect transcription of Ballaeus (Ballaios). Although from the linguistic point of view this identification is very problematic, some have accepted the idea that Ballaois was the successor of Gentius, who had friendly relations with Rome. Ballaois was an Illyrian king only attested on his coins and ruled (perhaps 167–135 BC or other dates) of the Ardiaei. Ballaios appears to have ruled after 168 BC at Queen Teuta's old stronghold, Rhizon. At the time the region was part of the Roman Republic and the Ardiaean kingdom had been dissolved since the time of Gentius. He had some sort of rivalry with Pharos. Whilst the abundance of his coinage in the region would suggest that he was a very influential figure there is no literary or historical evidence of his existence.

== Legacy ==
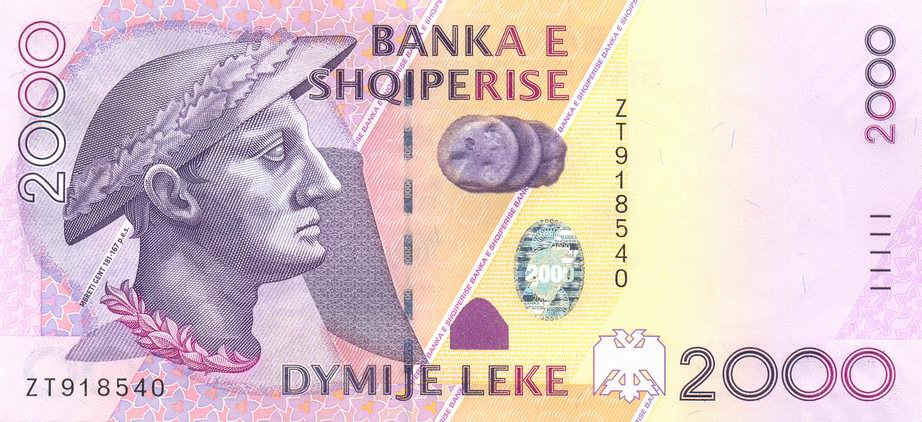
Gentius on the 2,000 lekë banknote

Gentiana lutea, and by extension the rest of the genus Gentiana, was named after Gentius, as a tribute as it was thought that he had found out that the herbs had tonic properties. Gentius is depicted on the reverse of the Albanian 50 lekë coin, issued in 1996 and 2000, and on the obverse of the 2000 lekë banknote, issued in 2008.

== See also ==
- List of rulers of Illyria

== Bibliography ==
- Šašel Kos, Marjeta (2007). "The Illyrian King Ballaeus – Some Historical Aspects". In Berranger, Danièle; Centre de recherches sur les civilisations antiques (eds.). Épire, Illyrie, Macédoine: Mélanges offerts au Professeur Pierre Cabanes. Presses Universitaire Blaise Pascal. ISBN 978-2-84516-351-5.
- Dzino, Danijel (2010). Illyricum in Roman Politics, 229 BC–AD 68. Cambridge University Press. ISBN 978-0-521-19419-8.
- Hammond, Nicholas Geoffrey Lemprière; Walbank, F. W. (1988). A History of Macedonia: Volume III: 336-167 B.C. Oxford University Press, USA. ISBN 0-19-814815-1.
- Jepson, Willis Linn (1975). A Manual of the Flowering Plants of California. University of California Press. ISBN 0-520-00606-2.
- May, J. M. F. (1946). "Macedonia and Illyria (217-167 B.C.)". The Journal of Roman Studies. 36: 48–56. doi:10.2307/298040. JSTOR 298040. S2CID 163116532.
- Polomé, Edgar (1982). "Balkan Languages (Illyrian, Thracian and Daco-Moeasian)". In J. Boardman; I. E. S. Edwards; N. G. L. Hammond; E. Sollberger (eds.). The Cambridge Ancient History: The Prehistory of the Balkans; and the Middle East and the Aegean world, tenth to eighth centuries B.C. Vol. III (part 1) (2 ed.). Cambridge University Press. ISBN 0521224969.
- Shpuza, Saimir; Dyczek, Piotr (2015). "Scodra, de la capitale du Royaume Illyrien à la capitale de la province romaine". In Jean-Luc Lamboley; Luan Përzhita; Altin Skenderaj (eds.). L'Illyrie Méridionale et l'Épire dans l'Antiquité – VI (in French). Vol. 1. Paris: Diffusion De Boccard. pp. 269–278. ISBN 978-9928-4517-1-2.
- Wilkes, John (1995). The Illyrians. Wiley-Blackwell. ISBN 0-631-19807-5.

Gentius Illyrian kingdom Born: Unknown Died: 167 BC
Preceded by Teuta	King of the Labeatai; 181–168 BC	Succeeded by Roman rule
