= Illyrian Eneti =

Illyrian people

The Eneti were a tribe or people who lived in a landlocked part of Illyria north and/or northwest of Macedonia in classical antiquity. They were neighbors of the Dardani and the Triballi. Classical accounts of them frequently conflate them with the separate Veneti around the northern Adriatic Sea and the Eneti around the southern Black Sea.

== Name ==
Eneti is the Latin form of the Greek Eneti (Ancient Greek: Ἐνετοί, Enetoí). Herodotus calls them the "Eneti of the Illyrians" (Ἰλλυριῶν Ἐνετοί, Illyriō̂n Enetoí).

== History ==
Along with the Taulanti, the Eneti were the oldest attested peoples expressly considered Illyrian in early Greek historiography. They were neighbors of the Dardani, Triballi, and Macedonians.

They are first attested in the 5th-century BC History of the Greek ethnographic historian Herodotus. While discussing the former custom of Babylonian villages' holding an annual auction of young women for marriage, he mentions that he has been told the Illyrian Eneti follow the same practice.

In his 2nd-century work on the 88–63 BC Mithridatic Wars between the Roman Republic and Mithridates VI of Pontus, Appian states at one point that the consul Sulla killed time while awaiting a reply from Mithridates by launching reprisal attacks from Macedonia against the neighboring Eneti, Dardani, and Sintians, who had been raiding Macedonia before his arrival. Sulla is reported to have devastated their territory.

The 12th-century Commentaries on Homer's Iliad written by Eustathius of Thessalonica includes the note that the 6th-century gazetteer Ethnica (Εθνικά, Ethniká) written by Stephanus of Byzantium mentioned the Eneti as dwelling beside the Triballi.

== See also ==
- Other Eneti
