= Romajë =

Village in Kosovo

Romajë: Romajë/Romaja (Albanian)
- Village
- Interactive map of Romajë
- Location within Kosovo
- Coordinates: 42°17′31″N 20°35′34″E
- Location: Kosovo
- District: Prizren
- Municipality: Prizren
- Elevation: 513 m (1,683 ft)

Population (2024)
  - Total: 2,361
- Time zone: UTC+1 (CET)
  - Summer (DST): UTC+2 (CEST)

Romajë (definite Albanian: Romaja) is a village in the Prizren municipality of Kosovo. It has 2,361 inhabitants as of 2024. The area of Romajë is the site of a multi-layered settlement of the pre-Roman Iron Age, the Roman era, and the medieval era. Excavations at the necropolis of Romajë have revealed extensive burial mounds (tumuli) of classical antiquity.

== Demographics ==
The village was mentioned in the Ottoman register of 1571 with 21 households and was inhabited by a Christian Albanian population with Albanian anthroponyms

== Geography ==
Romajë is situated in the transboundary Has region of Albania and present-day Kosovo. In Serbo-Croatian, it is known as Romaja (Ромаја in Cyrillic). The area of Romajë is the site of a multi-layered settlement of the pre-Roman Iron Age, the Roman era, and the medieval era. The archaeological site that is known as Sakra is located 1.5 kilometres (0.93 mi) to the west of the present-day village, between the right bank of the Drin and the Deshtica river.

== History ==
In a series of excavations in 1970–73, an Iron Age tumuli necropolis was found in the location of the site. It belongs to the Drin regional variation of the Illyrian Glasinac-Mati culture. Three of the sixteen burial mounds of the necropolis were excavated at the time. The largest mound is more than 5 metres (16 ft) in height and 40 metres (130 ft) in diameter. It contains 38 graves that must have belonged to a clan who used the tumulus for a period of several centuries. The graves date from sixth to the second century BCE.

The materials found in the graves included iron weapons, a horse harness, amber and glass beads, local and imported pottery, and ritualistic items. Graves from the sixth and fifth centuries BCE contain long iron bars that were placed in the tombs are a means of payment to the afterlife. They indicate that the tribe of the Dardani had developed a concept about the afterlife as shown later in other archaeological materials such as the votive monument of Smirë. The weapons included double-edged axes (Labrys), which might have been used in a ritualistic manner related to sun worship that was prevalent in the northern Illyrian tribes. Ancient Greek imports (pottery, weapons) at this period mark the beginning of more intense contact of the Dardani with the Mediterranean centers of antiquity. These burial materials attest to the fact that social differentiation had begun in Dardania and that they had a local elite class who could invest in luxury imports.

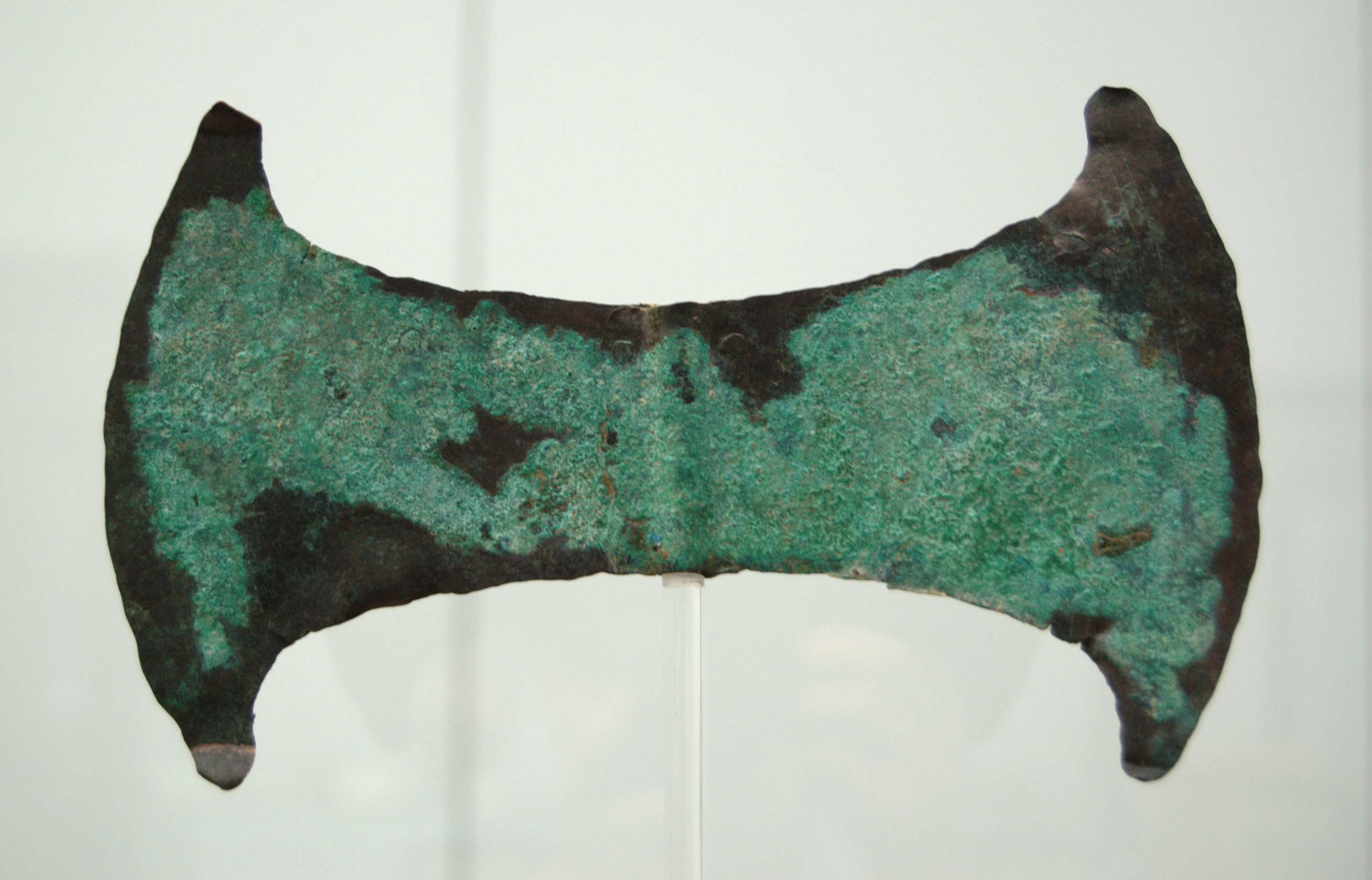
Labrys were found in Iron Age graves being excavated in Romajë

The trade flow of products that reached Romajë began from Apollonia and Epidamnos in southern Illyria and via the inland routes spread in the hinterland. Most of these items were produced in Athens and some came from the Ionian region. Imported weapons indicate that Dardanians of the time may have served as mercenaries in foreign wars after which they brought these weapons in their homeland.

The materials found in the tumuli are similar to those found in other tumuli in northern Albania, in particular, the tumuli of Kukës, which borders the Prizren region to the west and the tumuli of Mat farther to the southwest. The ceramics found in the site date to the early Iron Age, the Hellenistic era, and the Roman era.

Nearby stand the ruins of the medieval church of Shën Prene (Paraskevi of Rome). It is a single-nave structure, 7.5 metres (25 ft) in length and 5.2 metres (17 ft) in width.

== Bibliography ==
- Baraliu, Sedat; Muharremi, Ilir (2019). "Les importations grecques dans le territoire de Kosovo" (PDF). Studia Antica et Archaeologica. 25 (1).
- Palavestra, Aleksandar (1997). "Prehistoric amber and glass beads from Kosovo" (PDF). Balcanica.
- Shukriu, Edi (1977). "Kërkimet arkeologjike përgjatë rrjedhës së poshtme të Drinit të Bardhë / Recherches archéologiques le long du cours ultérieur de Drini i Bardhë". Iliria. 7–8. doi:10.3406/iliri.1977.1281.
- Shukriu, Edi (2008). "Prehistory and Antique History of Kosova" (PDF). Thesis Kosova. 1.
- Schermer, Shirley; Shukriu, Edi; Deskaj, Sylvia (2011). Marquez-Grant, Nicholas; Fibiger, Linda (eds.). The Routledge Handbook of Archaeological Human Remains and Legislation: An International Guide to Laws and Practice in the Excavation and Treatment of Archaeological Human Remains. Taylor & Francis. ISBN 1136879560.
- Đurić, N.; Glis̆ić, J.; Todorović, J. (1975). Praistorijska Romaja-Romaja parahistorike. Enti për urbanizëm dhe mbrojtjen e përmendoreve kulturore dhe rraritjeve natyrore.
