= Busavatë (site) =

Archaeological site Kosovo

- Location within Kosovo
- Interactive map of Busavatë
- 42°34′49″N 21°32′36″E
- Periods: Late Bronze Age; Iron Age (8th-7th centuries BCE); Classical-Hellenistic antiquity (5th-4th centuries BCE); Roman era Late Antiquity (4th-6th centuries CE)

Site notes
- Elevation: 725 m (2,379 ft)
- Area: 6 ha (15 acres)
- Discovered: 2016
- Management: Archaeological Institute of Kosovo

Busavatë known locally as Guri i Madh and Kërshi i Madh is an archaeological site in Kosovo. The site is an ancient settlement which existed from the Late Bronze Age to late antiquity. The settlement began as a hilltop settlement on the Busavatë hill at an altitude of 725 m. In the Hellenistic period, the settlement was moved at the slopes of the hill in the location known as Livadhet. The modern village of Busavatë is located in the vicinity of the ancient site.

== Site ==
The site was discovered in 2016 during a field survey of the Archaeological Institute of Kosovo in the region. The site first developed in the Late Bronze Age. Alaj (2019) has recorded the archaeological periodization of the site as follows: Busavatë I - LBA / II - EIA (8th-7th centuries BCE) / III - classical era (5th-4th centuries BCE)/ IV - Roman era / V - late antiquity/early medieval. Busavatë belongs to the same group of sites like Dardana Fortress which is ~10 km to the north-east of Busavatë. The total territory of the site is 6 ha. In the first period of the site in the Late Bronze Age it was as a hilltop settlement in a fortified position at an altitude of 725 m. Like other settlements which saw demographic growth during the Iron Age, the site was moved to a lowland position below the hilltop settlement in the Hellenistic era.

== Bibliography ==
- Alaj, Premtim (2019). Les habitats de l'Age du fer sur le territoire de l'actuel Kosovo (Thesis). Université de Lyon.
- Buqinca, Arianit (2021). Recherche sur les Dardaniens : VIe- Ier siècles av. J.- C. (Thesis). Université de Lyon.
