= Eneti =

Eneti (Latin) or Enetoi (Ancient Greek: Ἐνετοί, Enetoí) may refer to:

== People ==
- Adriatic Veneti, an ancient people who lived in northeastern Italy around present-day Venice
- Illyrian Eneti, an ancient people who lived just north or northwest of Macedonia
- Paphlagonian Eneti, an ancient people who lived in Paphlagonia in central Anatolia

== Other uses ==
- Eneti, a company that provides wind farm construction and service
