= Busavatë =

Busavatë Бусовата
- Village
- Country: Kosovo
- District: Gjilan
- Municipality: Kamenica

Population (2024)
  - Total: 476
- Time zone: UTC+1
  - Summer (DST): UTC+2

Busavatë or Bosovatë (Serbian Cyrillic: Бусовата) is a village in Kamenica municipality, Kosovo. It is located in the Gollak mountains.

== History ==
The modern village has developed in the vicinity of an ancient site originally located on the hill which overlooks the village. The ancient settlement developed in the Late Bronze Age and likely because of demographic expansion was moved to a more lowland position in the Hellenistic era.

Busovata is mentioned in the first half of the 15th century as Bosovata and Busovata (Boxovata, Buxovata) in the book of the sailors of the Novo-Brdo merchant Mikel Lukarevic. It also appears in Ottoman registers as Busovata.

== Demographics ==
As of 2011 this village has 804 inhabitants. 802 are Albanian, 1 is a Turk and one unknown.

== Sources ==
- Alaj, Premtim (2019). Les habitats de l'Age du fer sur le territoire de l'actuel Kosovo (Thesis). Université de Lyon.
