= Etuta =

2nd-century Illyrian queen

Teuta
- Reign: c. 169 – 168 BC
- Died: Italy
- Spouse: Gentius
- Father: Monunius II of Dardania

Etuta (ruled 169 – 168 BC) was an Illyrian queen of the Ardiaean Kingdom, married to Gentius. Etuta was a Dardanian princess, the daughter of Monunius II of Dardania.

== Biography ==
Etuta was earlier engaged to Gentius' brother, Plator, whom Gentius treacherously killed. Etuta married Gentius in 169 BC.

Gentius' objective was to secure the inheritance of the Ardiaean throne, but Livy reports he also envied his brother because he was going to marry Etuta. However, the marriage does not seem to have secured an Ardiaean–Dardanian alliance and as a result Gentius allied himself with Perseus of Macedon the enemy of his father-in-law.

After the defeat of Gentius in 168 BC, Etuta along with other important Illyrians were taken to Italy. Etuta and the royal family were sent to Spoletum, to be kept under observation. The inhabitants of Spoletum refused to keep the royal family under watch, so they were transferred to Iguvium. Etuta remained there until she died.

Etuta is also known as Etleuta and Etleva.

== Sources ==
- The Illyrians by J. J. Wilkes, 1992, ISBN 0-631-19807-5
