= Glasinac-Mati culture =

Archaeological culture in the Balkan Peninsula

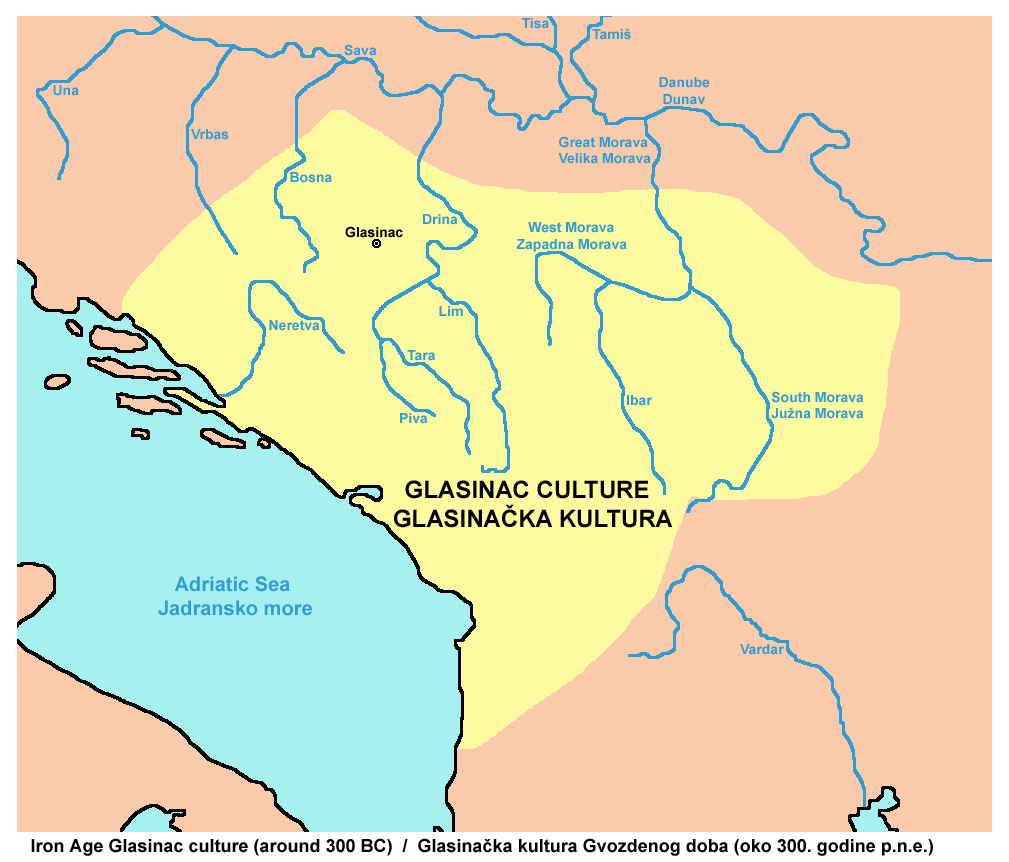
- Geographical range: Western Balkans
- Period: Late Bronze Age - Middle Iron Age
- Dates: c. 1600 — c. 300 BC
- Preceded by: Cetina culture

The Glasinac-Mati culture is an archaeological culture, which first developed during the Late Bronze Age and Early Iron Age in the western Balkan Peninsula in an area which encompassed much of modern Albania to the south, Kosovo to the east, Montenegro, southeastern Bosnia and Herzegovina and parts of western Serbia to the north. It is named after the Glasinac and Mati type site areas, located in Bosnia-Herzegovina and Albania respectively.

The Glasinac-Mati culture represents both continuity of middle Bronze Age practices in the western Balkans and innovations specifically related to the early Iron Age. Its appearance coincides with a population boom in the region as attested in numerous new sites which developed in that era. One of the defining elements of Glasinac-Mati is the use of tumuli burial mounds as a method of inhumation. Iron axes and other weapons are typical items found in the tumuli of all subregional variations of Glasinac-Mati. As it expanded and fused with other similar material cultures it came to encompass the area which was known in classical antiquity as Illyria.

== Periodization ==
- Glasinac I (1800–1500 BC)
- Glasinac II (1500–1300 BC)
- Glasinac III (1300–800 BC)
- Glasinac IV (800–500 BC)
  - Glasinac IV a (800–700 BC)
  - Glasinac IV b (700–625 BC)
  - Glasinac IV c-1 (625–550 BC)
  - Glasinac IV c-2 (550–500/475 BC)
- Glasinac V (500–200 BC)

== Nomenclature ==
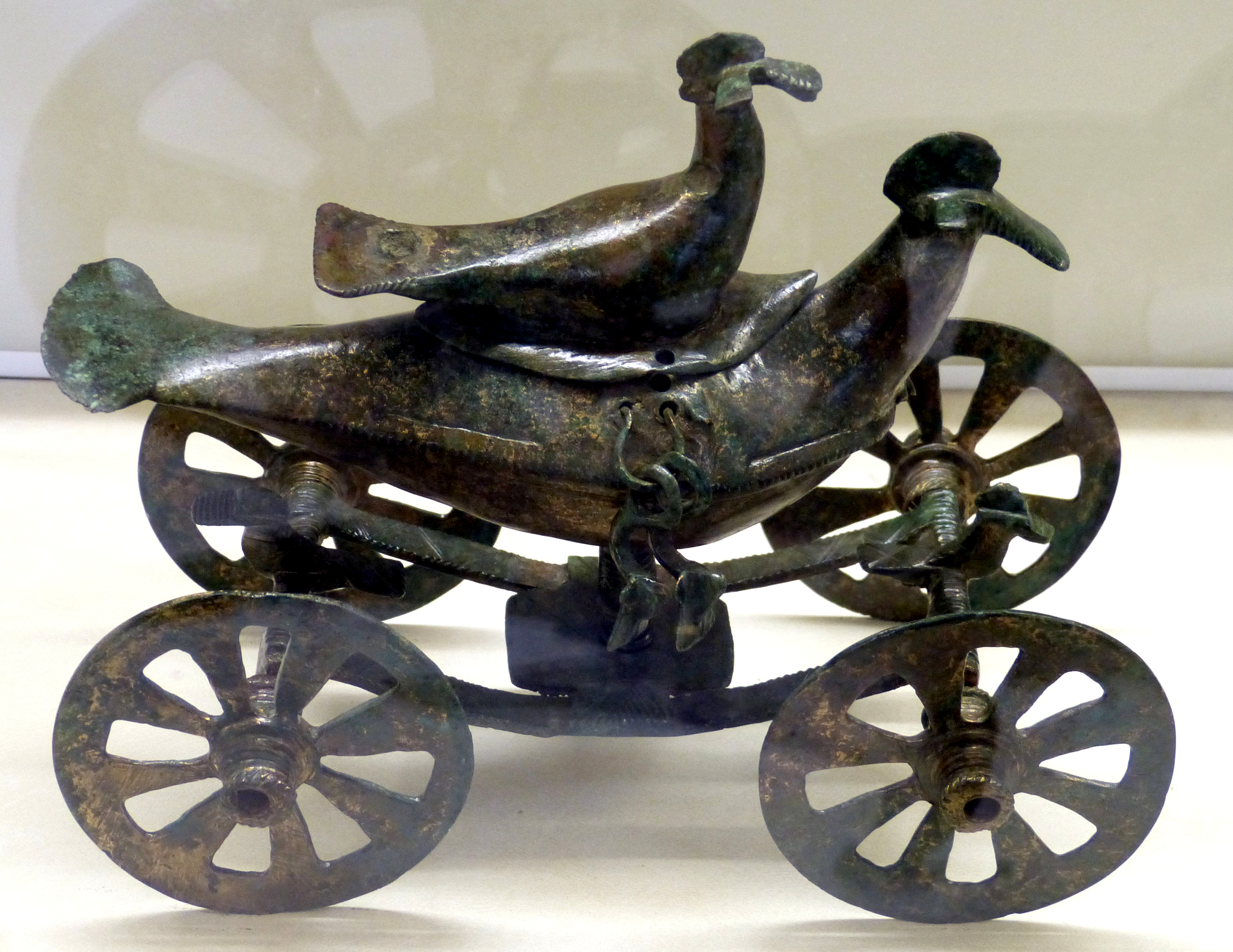
Iron Age cult carriage with birds (8th-5th century BC) belonging to Glasinac culture

The term "Glasinac-Mati" was coined in 1974 by archaeologists Frano Prendi and Klaus Kilian independently of each other. The word "Mat" is the indefinite variant of Mati in Albanian. As such, the term may appear in bibliography as "Glasinac-Mat" or simply as "Glasinac" (a reference to being the earliest type site that was identified and studied). "Mat-Glasinac" is an alternative of the binomial term. Other terms include "Mat-Glasinac-Drilon", as a reference to the particular variant which developed in historical Dardania and Glasinac-Burrel as a more narrow reference to the type site in Mat, which is located near Burrel.

== Sites ==
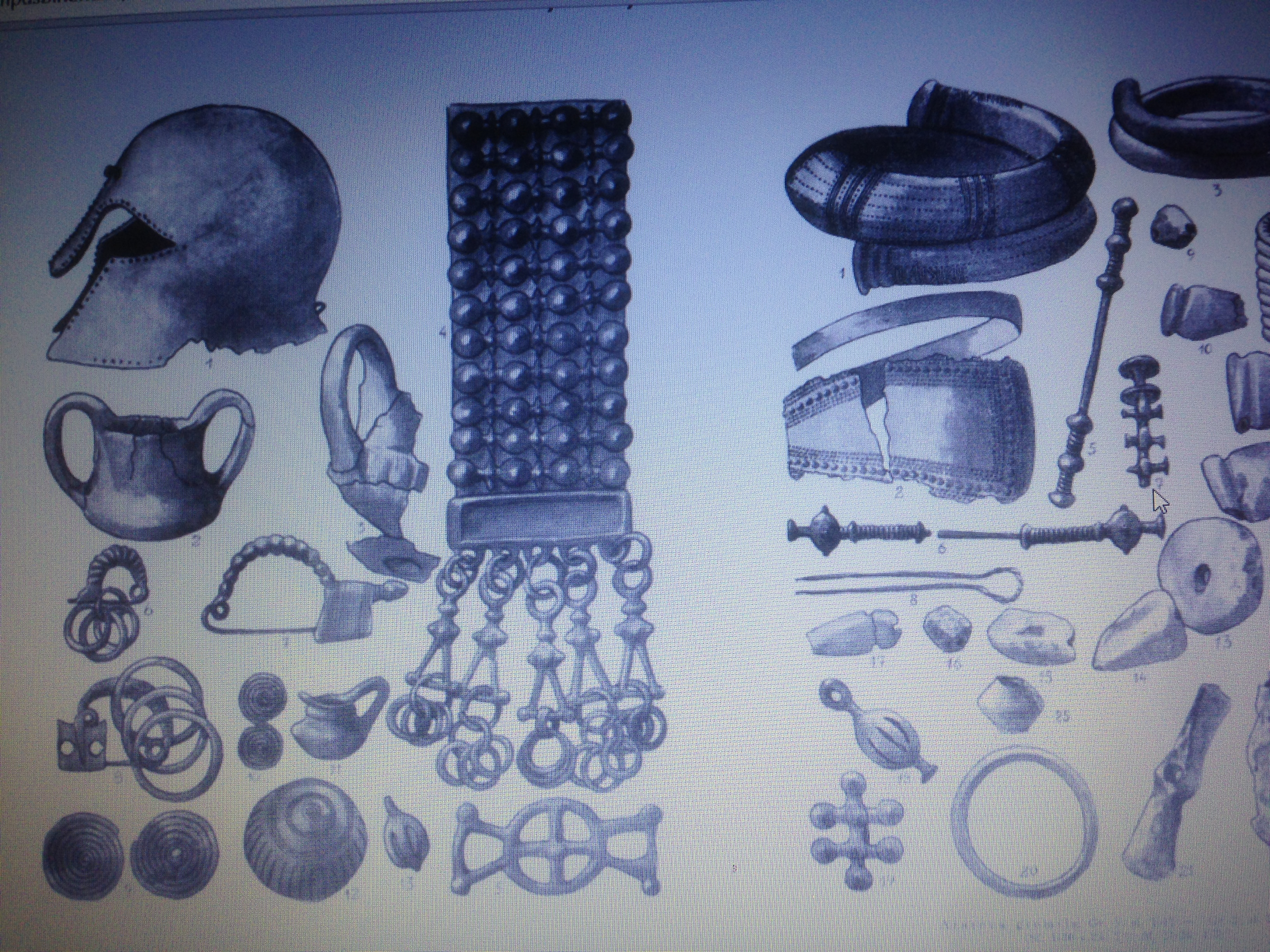
Glasinac artefacts, Iron Age

Research in Glasinac began in 1880 after the chance discovery of a burial mound of an Iron Age priest. The discovery signified the beginning of organized archaeological research in the region. From 1888 to 1897, a total of 1,234 mounds were excavated. They contained 1,000 tumuli with 3,000 to 5,000 finds in total. The first catalogues of the finds in Glasinac were produced in 1956-57 by archaeologists Alojz Benac and Borivoj Čović. In 1981, a revised catalogue which included an additional 192 graves from the Iron Age was produced by archaeologist Nora Lucentini. In total, 352 graves have been analyzed and subsequently catalogued. They represent 7%-12% of excavated finds in the graves of the Glasinac type site area.

The Mat and lower Fan river valleys in the area of the Zadrima plain developed tumuli sites which contained graves of a warrior class whose material culture matched that of Glasinac. These burial sites typically included many weapons and armor. They remained in use until the 4th century BCE when new burial practices emerged. In central Albania, the Glasinac-Mat culture is represented in the tumuli of Pazhok which appeared in the Late Bronze Age (c. 1300 BCE). Further to the south are the Late Bronze Age tumuli of Barç and the closely related early burials of Kuç and Zi, near present-day Korçë, which represent the southernmost extension of the Glasinac-Mati culture. The 9th-8th century fortifications of Symizë, Bellovodë, Bilisht, and Tren near the Small Prespa Lake, could also be related to them. The Drin river valley to the north-east of Mat around Kukës and to the east up to present-day Debar is marked by burial sites which appear in the Late Bronze Age and are closely linked to the Mat valley sites. These sites in turn are related to the sites which developed in western Kosovo around the Prizren area such as the site of Romajë.

== Culture ==
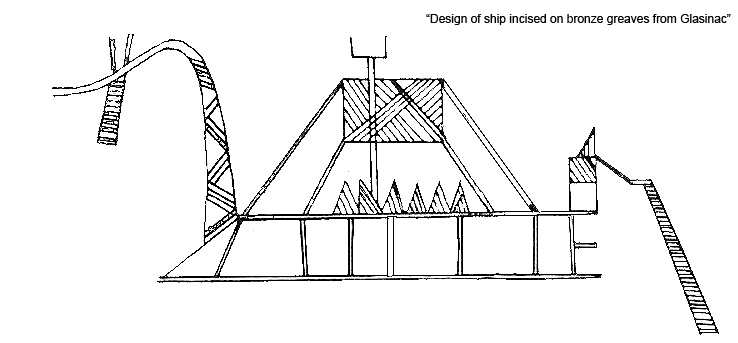
Depiction of a ship on a Glasinac-Mati bronze greave.

=== Ceramics ===
The ceramic corpus of the Glasinac-Mati group followed geometric patterns. It developed no significant variations until the late Iron Age. In Albania, excavated sites on both sides of the Shkumbin river have yielded little significant evolution in decorative patterns and forms until the end of the 6th century BCE.

== Interpretation ==
The Glasinac-Mati culture represents a local material development of the communities which emerged in the east Adriatic. These groups became known as Illyrians in historical times. Despite its eventual spread, the Glasinac-Mati culture is neither the "definitive" Illyrian material culture, nor is it the only material culture which developed among the historical Illyrians. The Glasinac-Mati culture also developed its own variants. It is classified as the central Illyrian group among related material cultures which were observed in the Iron Age with which it interacted. In total, at least six material cultures have been described to have emerged in Illyrian territories. Based on existing archaeological finds, comparative archaeological and geographical definition about them has been difficult.

== See also ==
- Hallstatt culture
- Urnfield culture

== Bibliography ==
- Mallory, J.P.; Adams, Douglas Q. (1997). Encyclopedia of Indo-European Culture. London: Fitzroy Dearborn Publishers. ISBN 978-1-884964-98-5.
- Alaj, Premtim (2019). Les habitats de l'Age du fer sur le territoire de l'actuel Kosovo (Thesis). Université de Lyon.
- Govedarica, Blagoje (2017). "The problem of interpretation of the decorated whetstones from the Glasinac area". Vjesnik za arheologiju i historiju dalmatinsku. 110 (1).
- Jaupaj, Lavdosh (2019). Etudes des interactions culturelles en aire Illyro-épirote du VII au III siècle av. J.-C (Thesis). Université de Lyon; Instituti i Arkeologjisë (Albanie).
- Kurti, Rovena (2017). "On some aspects of the Late Bronze Age burial costume from north Albania". Proceedings of the International Conference "New Archaeological Discoveries in the Albanian Regions" 30-31, January, Tirana 2017.
- Lazaridis, Iosif; Alpaslan-Roodenberg, Songül; et al. (26 August 2022). "The genetic history of the Southern Arc: A bridge between West Asia and Europe". Science. 377 (6609) eabm4247. Bibcode:2022Sci...377m4247L. doi:10.1126/science.abm4247. PMC 10064553. PMID 36007055. S2CID 251843620.
- Stipčević, Aleksandar (1977). The Illyrians: history and culture. Noyes Press. ISBN 978-0-8155-5052-5.
- Wilkes, John J. (1992). The Illyrians. Oxford, United Kingdom: Blackwell Publishing. ISBN 0-631-19807-5.
