= Bato (Dardanian chieftain) =

Illyrian king

- Reign: c. 206 BC – c. 176 BC
- Predecessor: Longarus
- Successor: Monunius II
- Father: Longarus

Bato (ruled c. 206 – 176 BC) was an Illyrian king of the Dardanian State. Bato was the son of Longarus whom he succeeded and the brother of Monunius II who ruled after him. Bato fought alongside the Romans against Macedon during the Second Macedonian War; he became a major threat to the Macedonians, and is known for using advanced war tactics against Athenagoras, However, after the war was over relations between Rome and the Dardanians soon deteriorated.

== Military activities ==
When the Romans returned to Illyria in 200 BC under the experienced commander P. Sulpicius Galba, they expected support from their former allies. After the Roman victories many kings, enemies of Macedonia came to the Roman camp: Pleuratus III of the Ardiaean Kingdom, Amynander, king of the Athamanians and Bato of the Dardanian State. The Roman commander told them he would call on their help when his army entered Macedonia. Bato was hoping that with the territorial gains Rome had achieved, he would have Paeonia under his control.

Philip V anticipated that the Romans line of advance would be in the Erigon valley and he was determined to protect his flanks from raids by Roman allies, the Aetolians in the south and Bato's forces in the north. He ordered his son Perseus to blockade the pass leading into Pelagonia. When the Romans made their move Philip recalled the troops under Perseus, and his cavalry defeat at Ottobolus on the river Erigon, though not a major reverse, was the outcome of a gamble after learning that Pleuratus' and Bato's armies had crossed the passes in strength and were already in Macedonia. In 199 BC Pleuratus and Bato took advantage of Philip's engagement in a war with the Romans on the western borders of kingdom. Though the invasions were concerted, it was the Dardanians who did the most damage. As soon as the Romans left to winter in Apollonia, Philip sent his general Athenagoras against the Dardania army, which was returning home laden with booty.

At the beginning, Athenagoras made skirmishes against their rear lines but when Bato's army turned their flags and assumed regular positions in front of the enemy, the battle turned into a full-fledged war. As soon as the Dardanians set out on the road, the king's men attacked them with their cavalry and light infantry. Bato did not have an army of this type and were carrying heavy weapons, but the nature of the terrain helped them.. Few were killed and a few more were injured, but none were taken prisoner, because in those few cases the Dardanians come out of their lines and in close formation they fight together or withdraw. The Dardanian army under Bato was a well-organized military force in line with the most advanced tactics of that time, but also distinguished by bravery, discipline and solidarity.

News of the Roman victory in 197 BC, drew Bato once again down the Vardar valley, but Philip caught and defeated him near the Paeonian capital Stobi with an army he had hastily conscripted from the cities of his kingdom. The Macedonians continued to hold Bylazora and through that Paeonia, whose return the Dardanians were still demanding thirty years after another major Roman victory. Bato did not receive any land as he had hoped in contrast to the Ardiaean Kingdom which was given lands so that Pleuratus could attack Macedonia from them. This angered the Dardanian State which hoped to annex Macedonian land and to free Paeonia, their allies. Such is the fact that in 190 BC, the Aetolians asked Bato for paid soldiers in their war against Rome.

Since it was difficult to defeat Bato militarily, Philip V drew up a plan to set the large Germanic/Celtic of the Bastarnae against him. He proposed to them that he would open a way to the Dardanian State so that the Bastarnae could settle there for a while and later continue on their way through Illyria, finally reaching Italy. Philip's purpose was to wipe out the Dardanians and settle the Bastarnae in their lands, and send the latter to Italy to lay it waste, leaving their women and children in Dardania. It was up to Monunius, the brother of Bato to confront the Bastarnae, as he succeeded Bato in 176 BC.

== See also ==
- List of rulers of Illyria

== Notes ==
- Bato was the first known person with this name. He is scarcely known in modern historiography as "Bato of Dardania", and "Bato the Dardanian". In modern history books, he is mostly indexed as "Bato, son of Longarus" (from Latin: Bato, Longari' filius and "Bato, prince of the Dardani".
