= Monunius (Dardanian chieftain) =

Illyrian king from c. 176 BC to 167 BC

- Reign: c. 176 – c. 167 BC
- Predecessor: Bato
- Ancient Greek: Μονούνιος
- Father: Longarus

Monunius (Ancient Greek Μονούνιος; ruled c. 176 – 167 BC) was an Illyrian king of the Dardanian State who lived in the late 3rd century BC and early 2nd century BC. Monunius attested first in 176 BC was the son of Longarus, a Dardanian king who caused much trouble to Macedonia from 230 BC onwards. He succeeded his brother Bato to the Dardanian throne. Monunius was known for his victory he inflicted on the Bastarnae during the Bastarnae Invasion of Dardania.

Etuta the daughter of Monunius married the Ardiaean King Gentius in 169 BC. Since the dynastic marriage relations seem not to have brought an alliance between the two Illyrian States, in 168 BC Gentius allied with Perseus, the enemy of his father-in-law. Many Dardanian kings of the same time were named Monunius and there seems to be some confusion as to whom certain actions and events pertain.

== Background ==
=== Macedonian alliances against Dardania ===
Since it was difficult to defeat the Dardanians militarily, Philip V drew up a plan to get the large Germanic/Celtic tribe of the Bastarnae against them. While on campaign in Thrace in 184 BC Philip sent agents to stir up the barbarians along the river Danube, that they might invade Italy. Two years later Philip was pleased to learn that the Bastarnae had accepted his alliance and were offering a princess in marriage for one of his sons, Perseus as it turned out. This formidable people, dwelt beyond the lower Danube but were often willing to join in expeditions far from their homelands. The following year Philip mass deportations from Paeonia where he filled the towns with Thracians and other barbarians, as being likely to remain more securely loyal to him in the coming hour of danger, that is war with Rome. In fact Philip's purpose for the Bastarnae was more specific to the security of Macedonia: They were to invade and eject the Dardanians under Monunius and take over their country, and later continue on their way through Illyria, finally reaching Italy. Livy (XL, 574-9) writes that Philip's purpose was to wipe out the Dardanians and settle the Bastarnae in their lands (in the Polog valley), and send them to Italy and lay it waste, leaving their women and children in Dardania.

It was a typically ruthless yet realistic scheme, and was later imitated in the Danube lands on more than one occasion by the Romans. The Bastarnae were accompanied by the kindred Scordisci whose lands their route lay. To get the Bastarnae to Monunius' State, Philip had gone to great trouble and expense to arrange safe passage through the Thracians. They left home after a great deal of hesitation but had gone as far as Amphipolis when, in summer of 179 BC, news arrived that Philip V was dead. Soon there was trouble with the Thracians and the Bastarnae retreated to Donica (perhaps Rila), a high mountain in western Thrace. After Philp's death, his son Perseus tried to follow through his fathers plans. After further skirmishes some decided to return home and set off for Appolonia and Mesembria on the Black Sea coast of Thrace, but the rest, under the leadership of Clondicus, pressed on towards Monunius and set about to eject the population in accordance with their arrangement with the late king.

=== Rome's refusal of help ===
In 176 BC Monunius sent envoys to Rome with news of an invasion by the Bastarnae. The Dardanian envoys declared that they were warriors massive in size and numbers and alleged that they were in league with Perseus and the Gauls. Representatives from Thessaly appeared also in order to confirm the story and back up Monunius. The patres would make their customary response, they would send an embassy to investigate. On the return of that embassy, Livy records that the Romans reported only that a Dardanian war was underway, and Appian adds that they had observed a major military build-up in Macedonia. Perseus in the meantime, dispatched his own envoys to Rome with denials that he had any part in the activity of the Bastarnae. The senate would neither censure nor absolve Perseus, but simply directed that he take care to giving the appearance of observing his treaty with Rome and therefore the senate did nothing to support Monunius.

== Bastarnae invasion ==
Map of the Roman Empire and contemporary indigenous Europe in AD 125, showing the location of the Bastarnae, divided into two groups.

In 175 BC, the Bastarnae supported by the Thracians and the Scordisci, began the invasion and stormed into Dardania. To face the incoming danger, Monunius mobilized all his forces and concentrated them in the city (name of which is not known) closest to the camp of the Bastarnae. Monunius waited for the beginning of winter to launch the decisive strike, when the allies of the Bastarnae would return to their countries. As soon as the Dardanians had learned of their withdrawal, which left on the forces of the Bastarnae, numbering 30,000, on the field, Monunius separated his forces into two armies. The first was to march head on to the enemy and attack them directly, while the other unit was to march along hidden roads and attack from the rear. But the battle began before the second army back to the enemy's back; the defeated Dardanians withdrew to the city, which was just twelve miles from the camp of the Bastarnae. The victors immediately surrounded the city, believing either that the Dardanians would soon surrender from fear or that they immediately take the city by force. Meanwhile, the second of Monunius' army, having made its way unaware of the loss of the first, found the camp of the Bastarnae undefended, and easily took it without any effort. Having lost their entire baggage and supplies, the Bastarnae were obliged to withdraw from Dardania and to return home. Most perished as they crossed the frozen Danube on foot, only for the ice to give way. Among the survivors was Clondicus who had led the people into Dardania four years earlier.

Despite the failure of Philip's Bastarnae strategy, the suspicion aroused by these events in the Roman Senate, which had been warned by the Dardani of the Bastarnae invasion, ensured the demise of Macedonia as an independent state. Thus Monunius managed to protect the borders of the Dardanian State which would have perished otherwise.

== Neutrality ==
Monunius engaged his daughter, Etuta to the Ardiaean King Gentius in 169 BC. However, the marriage does not seem to have secured an Illyrian-Dardanian alliance. Perseus conquered a broad swath of territory in the south of the Dardanian State, also taking the region of Penesta (Polog valley) with its cities Uscana, Oene and Draudachus. In order to stop the Dardanian raids into Macedonia, Perseus burned and destroyed the regions to the north and west of Mount Scardus (Sar Mountains), an area known thereafter as 'Deserted Illyria'. Through these campaigns, Perseus annihilated the military bases that the Romans had built in the north-west of his kingdom, cut off for good the routes the Dardanians had used for their forays into Macedonia, and inserted himself like a wedge between Monunius and Gentius. Since the dynastic marriage relations seem not to have brought an alliance between the two Illyrian States, in 168 BC Gentius allied with Perseus, the enemy of his father-in-law. Nonetheless, Monunius preserved Dardanians neutrality, both in the war between Gentius and Perseus on the one hand and the war with the Romans on the other. After the destruction of Macedonia in 167 BC, the Dardanians ask the consul Paullus Aemilius for control of Paeonia, but he refused, giving them only the right to trade in salt there. Many Dardanian kings of the same time were named Monunius and there seems to be some confusion as to whom certain actions and events pertain.

== See also ==
- Illyrian warfare
- Illyrians
- List of rulers of Illyria
