= Ardiaean-Labeatan dynasty =

Ancient Illyrian dynasty

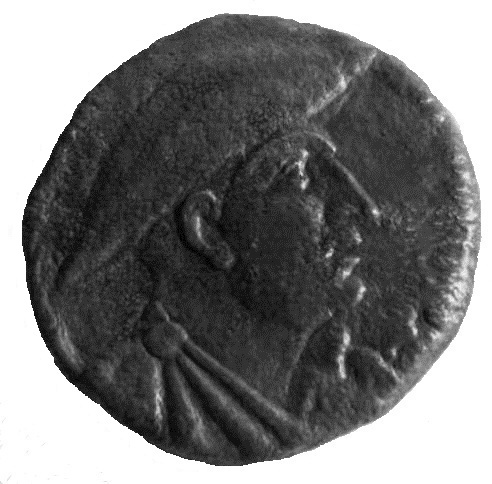
Coin of Gentius.

This is a list of Illyrian rulers (kings and queens) from the Ardiean-Labeatan dynasty:

- Pleuratus II: reigned in a time of peace and prosperity for the Illyrian kingdom., ruled BC 260 ~ BC 250
- Agron of Illyria: reigned from 250 BC to 230 BC. In 231 BC, Agron possessed the most powerful land army and navy, of any of the kings who had reigned Illyria before him. He extended the kingdoms' borders in the north and south.
- Queen Teuta (regent for Pinnes): forced to come to terms with the Romans in 227 BC.
- Demetrius of Pharos: surrenders to the Romans at Pharos in 218 BC and flees to Macedonia., ruled B.C 222~B.C 219
- Scerdilaidas: allied with Rome to defeat Macedonia in 208 BC., ruled B.C 218~B.C 206
- Pinnes: too young to become king; ruled under the regency of Teuta, Demetrius and Scerdilaidas., ruled B.C 230~B.C 217
- Pleuratus III: rewarded by the Romans in 196 BC, with lands annexed by the Macedonians., ruled B.C 205~B.C 181
- Gentius: defeated by the Romans in 168 BC during the Third Illyrian War; Illyrian kingdom ceased to exist while the king was taken prisoner., ruled B.C 181~B.C 168
- Ballaios: Ruled from c. 167 BC to c. 135 BC over the city of Rhizon and surrounding areas after Roman occupation, until 135 BC.

== See also ==
- Ardiaei
- Labeatae
- Illyrian kingdom
- Enchelean-Taulantian dynasty

== Bibliography ==
- Bilić, Tomislav (2020). "Greek-Illyrian coinage of the central Adriatic region: an overview". TEME. 2 (LATINA & GRAECA – NOVA SERIJA 38): 7–20. ISSN 1820-7804.
- Dyczek, Piotr (2019). "Illyrian King Ballaios, King Agron and Queen Teuta from ancient Rhizon". ANODOS Studies of the Ancient World (13/2013). Trnavská univerzita v Trnave, Filozofcká fakulta: 195–202. ISSN 1338-5410.
