= 230s BC =

Decade

This article concerns the period 239 BC – 230 BC.

== Events ==
=== 239 BC ===
==== By place ====
====== Carthage ======
- Concerned that Hamilcar Barca's leniency in pardoning those who he has captured who have participated in the Mercenary War will encourage others to defect, Mathos and Spendius order the mutilation and execution of "about seven hundred" Carthaginian prisoners, including Gesco. With the mercenaries jointly guilty of these atrocities, defectors dare not face Carthaginian justice under Hamilcar.
- Carthage is besieged by the mercenary armies, while the city of Utica revolts and attempts to secede from Carthage. Carthage appeals to Hiero II of Syracuse and to Rome for aid against the mercenaries. However, the mercenary leaders reject the efforts of Roman mediators.
- Sardinia revolts against Carthage and Rome takes the opportunity to annex the island.

====== Greece ======
- Antigonus II, King of Macedonia, dies and is succeeded by his son, Demetrius II.
- With Aetolia now as its ally, the Achaean League under the command of Aratus of Sicyon repeatedly attacks Athens and Argos.

====== Seleucid Empire ======
- Seleucus II's brother Antiochus Hierax, who is governor of Seleucid Anatolia, sends an army into Syria ostensibly to assist Seleucus but actually to seize the rest of the empire. After achieving peace with Egypt, Seleucus II promptly invades Anatolia and begins the "War of the Brothers".

====== Persia ======
- Diodotus of Bactria defeats an army of Parthians. He dies shortly thereafter and is succeeded by his son Diodotus II.

====== China ======
- Cheng Jiao, the half-brother of Ying Zheng, the king of Qin, is sent to attack the State of Zhao, but he attempts to usurp power and is defeated and executed.
- Qin Prime Minister Lü Buwei publishes the "Spring and Autumn Annals of Lü Buwei" (Lüshi Chunqiu).
- Rough date: The Zhao general Pang Nuan captures the Qi city of Rao'an and the Yan cities of Li and Yangcheng.

====== Korea ======
- Haemosu, who is a descendant of the people of the empire of Gojoseon, establishes the ancient kingdom of Bukbuyeo in modern-day Jilin, northeast China.

=== 238 BC ===
==== By place ====
====== Rome ======
- Rome captures Corsica and Sardinia

====== Carthage ======
- Hamilcar Barca strikes at the supply lines of the mercenary army besieging Carthage, forcing them to cease the siege of the city. He then fights a series of running engagements with the mercenary armies, keeping them off balance. Hamilcar manages to force the mercenary armies into a box canyon in the Battle of "The Saw". The mercenaries are besieged in the canyon.
- The mercenary army, under the leadership of Spendius, attempts to fight its way out of the siege but is totally defeated by the Carthaginian forces led by Hamilcar Barca. After the battle, Hamilcar executes some 40,000 rebel mercenaries.
- Hamilcar's armies capture a number of rebel Libyan cities. The Libyan settlements that have rebelled surrender to Carthage, with the exception of Utica and Hippacritae.
- Hamilcar and another Carthaginian general, Hannibal, besiege Mathos' mercenary army at Tunis and crucify the captured mercenary leaders in sight of the mercenary battlements.
- Mathos exploits a weakness in Hannibal's defenses and launches an attack against his army, capturing Hannibal and several other high ranking Carthaginians. The mercenaries then crucify the captured Carthaginian leaders.
- Carthaginian reinforcements led by Hanno the Great join the battle. They defeat Mathos' mercenary forces and Mathos is captured.
- The Carthaginian armies besiege and capture Utica and Hippacritae. This ends the Carthaginian civil war.
- The Romans declare war on the Carthaginians over which state controls Sardinia. However, Carthage defers to Rome rather than enter yet another war and gives up any claim to Sardinia.

====== Egypt ======
- The Decree of Canopus, also called "Table of Tanis", is a memorial stone promulgated by an assemblage of priests in honour of Ptolemy III Euergetes and his consort Berenice. The decree, written in Greek, demotic, and hieroglyphs is an ancient bilingual Egyptian decree that provides a key for deciphering hieroglyphic and the simpler demotic scripts.

====== Persia ======
- Arsaces, chief of an Iranian nomad tribe, the Parni, invades and conquers Parthia killing, in the process, the local ruler Andragoras.

Asia Minor

- A joint Seleucid-Galatian invasion of Pergamon is defeated at the Battle of Aphrodisium

====== China ======
- Ying Zheng, having reached adulthood, celebrates his capping ceremony as the king of Qin.
- Ying Zheng and Prime Minister Lü Buwei crush the rebellion of Lao Ai. Lao Ai is executed.

=== 237 BC ===
==== By place ====
====== Carthage ======
- Hamilcar Barca's success in defeating the rebels results in a growth in his strength as leader of Carthage's popular party and support for his proposed invasion of the Iberian Peninsula. However, as spokesman for the landed nobility, Hanno opposes the policy of foreign conquest pursued by Hamilcar Barca.
- Nevertheless, Hamilcar Barca leads a Carthaginian army in an invasion of the Iberian Peninsula with the aim of building a base from which war with Rome can be renewed. By skillful generalship and able diplomacy, Hamilcar extends Carthaginian dominion over many Spanish tribes.

====== China ======
- Lü Buwei is deposed as the Prime Minister of Qin.

=== 236 BC ===
==== By place ====
====== Asia Minor ======
- Antiochus Hierax, supported by his mother Laodice I, allies himself with the Galatians (Celts) and two other states that are traditional foes of the Seleucid kingdom. With the aid of these forces, he inflicts a crushing defeat on his older brother Seleucus II's army at Ancyra in Anatolia. Seleucus leaves the country beyond the Taurus Mountains to his brother and the other powers of the peninsula.

====== Egypt ======
- Eratosthenes is appointed by King Ptolemy III Euergetes as head and third librarian of the Alexandrian library.

====== China ======
- King Ying Zheng of the State of Qin begins a series of campaigns against the State of Zhao that will end with Zhao's conquest in 228 BC. The Qin generals Huan Yi and Wang Jian seize nine cities in the Yecheng region.

====== Sri Lanka ======
- Buddhism is introduced to Sri Lanka by Mahinda, a monk acting on behalf of the late Ashoka.

=== 235 BC ===
==== By place ====
====== Roman Republic ======
- In Rome, the consul Titus Manlius Torquatus presides over the first ever closing of the gates of the Temple of Janus, signifying peace.

====== Asia Minor ======
- Under King Attalus I, Pergamum begins to build up its power and importance.
- Antiochus Hierax defeats his brother King Seleucus II Callinicus at the Battle of Ancyra.

====== Greece ======
- Aratus of Sicyon brings Megalopolis into the Achaean League.
- The ephor, Lysander, claims to have seen a sign from the gods against King Leonidas II of Sparta so Leonidas flees to avoid his trial. In his absence Leonidas is deposed from the throne and replaced by his son-in-law Cleomenes III.

====== China ======
- The exile Lü Buwei, facing the suspicion of Ying Zheng, commits suicide.

==== By topic ====
====== Literature ======
- A work by the Latin epic poet and dramatist Gnaeus Naevius is performed for the first time.

=== 234 BC ===
==== By place ====
====== Greece ======
- The Epirote Alliance is replaced by the Epirote League, which is a federal state with its own parliament (or synedrion).
- The city of Pleuron is destroyed by Demetrius II of Macedon.
- After the resignation of Lydiadas, the city of Megalopolis joins the Achaean League.

====== Roman Republic ======
- Corsica, Sardinia and Liguria rebel unsuccessfully against Rome.

====== China ======
- The Qin general Huan Yi wins a major victory over the Zhao general Hu Zhe in the Battle of Pingyang, and captures Pingyang and Wucheng.

=== 233 BC ===
==== By place ====
====== China ======
- The Zhao general Li Mu defeats the Qin army, led by Huan Yi, in the Battle of Fei.

=== 232 BC ===
==== By place ====
====== Seleucid Empire ======
- The Seleucid king Seleucus II Callinicus undertakes an expedition into the interior of Iran to try to regain Parthia, but his efforts come to nothing. According to some sources, he is even taken prisoner for several years by the Parthian king, Arsaces I. Other sources mention that he establishes a peace with Arsaces I by recognising his sovereignty over Parthia.

====== Roman Republic ======
- Despite the opposition of the Roman Senate and of his own father, the Roman political leader Gaius Flaminius wins the passage of a measure to distribute land among the plebeians. The Romans decide to parcel out land north of Rome (the Ager Gallicus) into small holdings for its poorer citizens whose farms have fallen into ruin during the First Punic War.

====== China ======
- The king of Qin, Ying Zheng, invites Prince Han Fei, a legalist philosopher and member of the Han royal family, to the Qin court. However, at the instigation of Li Si, he then has him imprisoned and executed as a threat to the state.
- The Zhao general Li Mu defeats the Qin army in the Battle of Fanwu.

==== By topic ====
====== Philosophy ======
- Following the death of his mentor, Cleanthes of Assos, Chrysippus of Soli succeeds him as the third head of the Stoic school. The many writings of Chrysippus, about the Stoic doctrines, will later earn him the title of Second Founder of Stoicism.

=== 231 BC ===
==== By place ====
====== Greece ======
- Demetrius II, king of Macedonia, seeks military help from Agron, king of Illyria, a loosely organized state on the Adriatic coast north of Epirus, against the advancing Aetolians. The Illyrian army routs the Aetolians and returns home as the victor.

====== Roman Republic ======
- The Romans send envoys to Massilia (modern Marseille, France) to negotiate with the Carthaginian general Hamilcar Barca who is based there.

=== 230 BC ===
==== By place ====
====== Asia Minor ======
- The city of Pergamum is attacked by the Galatians (Celts who have settled in central Anatolia) because the leader of Pergamum, Attalus I Soter, has refused to pay them the customary tribute. Attalus crushes his enemy in a battle outside the walls of his city and to mark the success he takes the title of king and the name Soter.

====== Greece ======
- King Agron of Illyria dies. Pinnes, the son of Agron and Agron's first wife Triteuta, officially succeeds his father as king, but the kingdom is effectively ruled by Agron's second wife, Queen Teuta (Tefta), who expels the Greeks from the Illyrian coast and then launches Illyrian pirate ships into the Ionian Sea, preying on Roman shipping. She continues her husband's policy of attacking cities on the west coast of Greece and practising large-scale piracy in the Adriatic and Ionian Seas.

====== Roman Republic ======
- With Roman merchants being killed by the Illyrian pirates, envoys are sent by Rome to Illyria. After the Roman ambassador Lucius Coruncanius and the Issaean ambassador Cleemporus are murdered at sea by Illyrian soldiers after causing offence to Queen Teuta, Roman forces occupy the island of Corcyra with the aim of humbling Teuta.

====== Egypt ======
- The Temple of Horus is built by King Ptolemy III.

====== China ======
- The state of Han is conquered by the state of Qin.

====== India ======
- King Kubera rules Bhattiprolu in Guntur, Andhra Pradesh.

== Births ==
239 BC

- Quintus Ennius, Latin poet and writer, considered the father of Roman poetry (approximate date)

238 BC

- Masinissa, king of Numidia (approximate date)
- Philip V, king (basileus) of Macedonia (d. 179 BC)

236 BC

- Scipio Africanus, Roman general in the Second Punic War and statesman of the Roman Republic (approximate date) (d. 183 BC)

235 BC

- Ellalan, king of the Anuradhapura Kingdom (d. 161 BC)

234 BC

- Marcus Porcius Cato (Cato the Elder), Roman statesman, (d. 149 BC)
- Mete Khan, Xiongnu emperor, (d. 174 BC)

232 BC

- Xiang Yu, Chinese rebel general against the Qin dynasty, as well as the later nemesis of Liu Bang in the civil war of the Chu-Han contention (d. 202 BC)

231 BC

- Hieronymus, tyrant of Syracuse (d. 214 BC)
- Han Xin, prominent Chinese general of the early Han dynasty is born.

== Deaths ==
239 BC

- Antigonus II Gonatas, king of Macedon from 277 BC who has rebuilt his kingdom's power and established its hegemony over Greece (b. c. 319 BC)
- Diodotus I, king of the Greco-Bactrian Kingdom (b. c. 285 BC)
- Huanhui of Han, Chinese king of the Han State

238 BC

- Andragoras, Seleucid governor (satrap) of Parthia
- Autaritus, Gallic mercenary leader
- Chunshen, Chinese nobleman
- Hannibal, Carthaginian general
- Kaolie of Chu, Chinese king of the Chu State
- Lao Ai, Chinese eunuch and official
- Xun Zi, Chinese philosopher (approximate date)

237 BC

- Xun Zi, Confucian philosopher who has contributed to one of the Hundred Schools of Thought (b. c. 310 BC)
- Istolatios, warlord of the Turdetani (Iberian Peninsula), crucified by Hamilcar Barca (father of Hannibal)

235 BC

- Aristippus, Greek tyrant of Argos
- Lü Buwei, Chinese politician (b. 291 BC)

234 BC

- Pharnavaz I of Iberia, King of Georgia
- Zenodotus of Ephesus, first librarian of the Library of Alexandria

233 BC

- Deidamia II is the Greek princess and daughter of Pyrrhus II of Epirus (approximate date)
- Han Fei, Chinese philosopher who, along with Li Si, has developed Xun Zi's philosophy into the doctrine embodied by the School of Law (or Legalism) (b. c. 280 BC)

232 BC

- Ashoka, Indian emperor, who has ruled the Maurya Empire across the Indian subcontinent from 273 BC (b. 304 BC)
- Cleanthes of Assos, Stoic philosopher who has been the head of the Stoic school from 263 BC, after the death of Zeno of Citium (b. c. 301 BC)

231 BC

- Agron, king of the Ardiaean Kingdom (Western Balkans)

230 BC

- Adherbal, admiral of the Carthaginian fleet who has battled for domination of the Mediterranean Sea for Carthage in the First Punic War against Rome
- Agron of Illyria as aforementioned (vid. supra)
- Aristarchus of Samos, Greek astronomer and mathematician (b. c. 310 BC)
