= 230 BC =

230 BC in various calendars
Gregorian calendar	230 BC; CCXXX BC
Ab urbe condita	524
Ancient Egypt era	XXXIII dynasty, 94
Pharaoh	Ptolemy III Euergetes, 17
Ancient Greek Olympiad (summer)	137th Olympiad, year 3
Assyrian calendar	4521
Balinese saka calendar	N/A
Bengali calendar	−823 – −822
Berber calendar	721
Buddhist calendar	315
Burmese calendar	−867
Byzantine calendar	5279–5280
Chinese calendar	庚午年 (Metal Horse); 2468 or 2261 — to — 辛未年 (Metal Goat); 2469 or 2262
Coptic calendar	−513 – −512
Discordian calendar	937
Ethiopian calendar	−237 – −236
Hebrew calendar	3531–3532
- Hindu calendars
Vikram Samvat	−173 – −172
Shaka Samvat	N/A
Kali Yuga	2871–2872
Holocene calendar	9771
Iranian calendar	851 BP – 850 BP
Islamic calendar	877 BH – 876 BH
Javanese calendar	N/A
Julian calendar	N/A
Korean calendar	2104
Minguo calendar	2141 before ROC 民前2141年
Nanakshahi calendar	−1697
Seleucid era	82/83 AG
Thai solar calendar	313–314
Tibetan calendar	ལྕགས་ཕོ་རྟ་ལོ་ (male Iron-Horse) −103 or −484 or −1256 — to — ལྕགས་མོ་ལུག་ལོ་ (female Iron-Sheep) −102 or −483 or −1255

Year 230 BC was a year of the pre-Julian Roman calendar. At the time it was known as the Year of the Consulship of Barbula and Pera (or, less frequently, year 524 Ab urbe condita). The denomination 230 BC for this year has been used since the early medieval period, when the Anno Domini calendar era became the prevalent method in Europe for naming years.

== Events ==
=== By place ===
==== Asia Minor ====
- The city of Pergamum is attacked by the Galatians (Celts who have settled in central Anatolia) because the leader of Pergamum, Attalus I Soter, has refused to pay them the customary tribute. Attalus crushes his enemy in a battle outside the walls of his city and to mark the success he takes the title of king and the name Soter.

==== Greece ====
- King Agron of Illyria dies. Pinnes, the son of Agron and Agron's first wife Triteuta, officially succeeds his father as king, but the kingdom is effectively ruled by Agron's second wife, Queen Teuta (Tefta), who expels the Greeks from the Illyrian coast and then launches Illyrian pirate ships into the Ionian Sea, preying on Roman shipping. She continues her husband's policy of attacking cities on the west coast of Greece and practising large-scale piracy in the Adriatic and Ionian Seas.

==== Roman Republic ====
- With Roman merchants being killed by the Illyrian pirates, envoys are sent by Rome to Illyria. After the Roman ambassador Lucius Coruncanius and the Issaean ambassador Cleemporus are murdered at sea by Illyrian soldiers after causing offence to Queen Teuta, Roman forces occupy the island of Corcyra with the aim of humbling Teuta.

==== Egypt ====
- The Temple of Horus is built by King Ptolemy III.

==== China ====
- The state of Han is conquered by the state of Qin.

==== India ====
- King Kubera rules Bhattiprolu in Guntur, Andhra Pradesh.

== Deaths ==
- Adherbal, admiral of the Carthaginian fleet who has battled for domination of the Mediterranean Sea for Carthage in the First Punic War against Rome
- Agron of Illyria as aforementioned (vid. supra)
- Aristarchus of Samos, Greek astronomer and mathematician (b. c. 310 BC)
