= Illyrian kingdom =

Ancient western Balkan kingdom

- c. 500 BC–135 BC
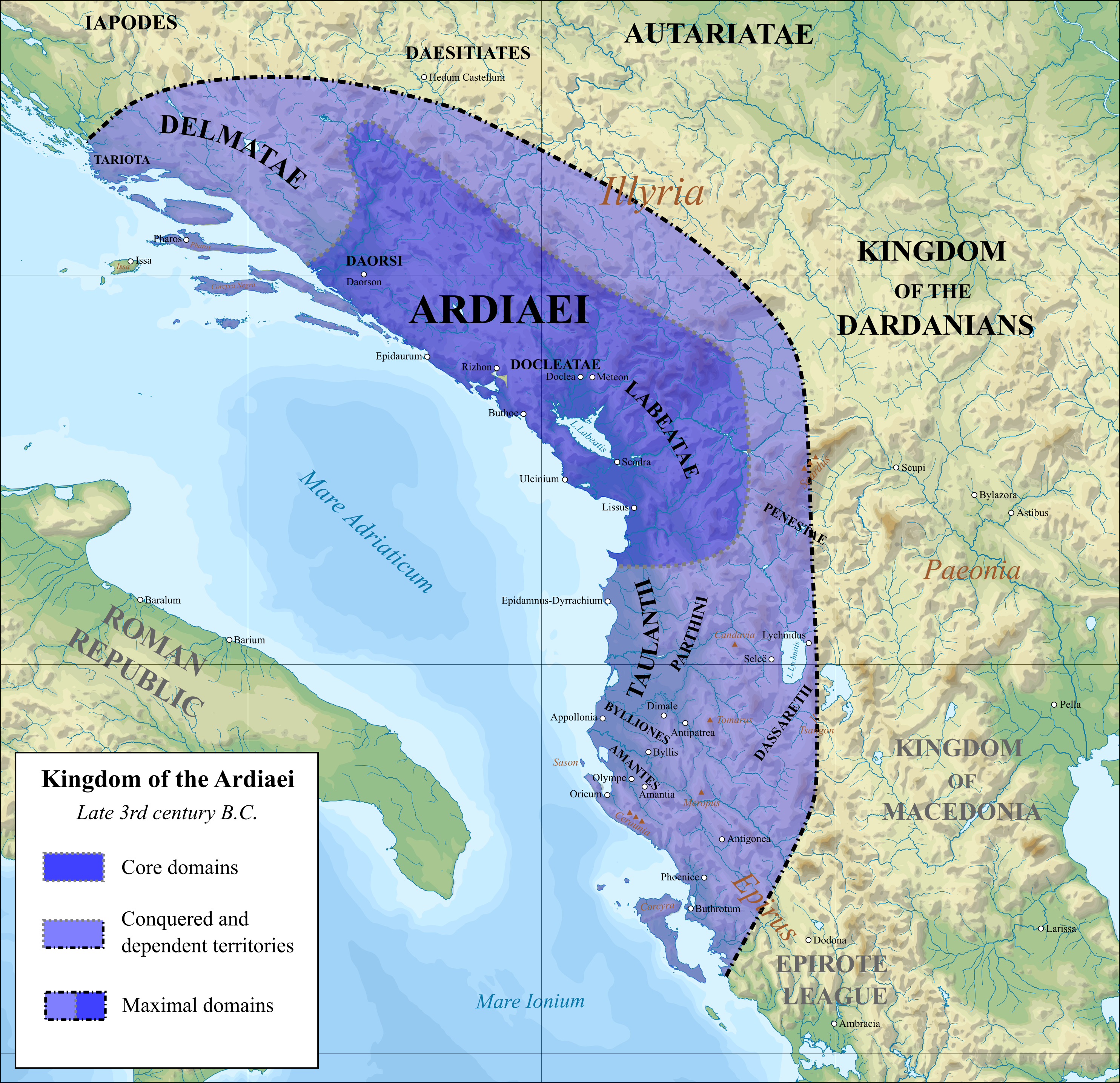
- Kingdom of the Ardiaei under Agron's and Teuta's reign and prior to the war with the Roman Republic in 229 BCE.
- Capital: Known: Rhizon; Skodra
- Common languages: Illyrian language
- Religion: Illyrian religion
- Government: Monarchy
- King
  - c. 400 BC–358 BC: Bardylis (first undisputed)
  - 181 BC–168 BC: Gentius (last known)
- Historical era: Classical antiquity
  - Established: c. 500 BC
  - Disestablished: 135 BC

The Illyrian kingdom was an Illyrian political entity that existed on the western part of the Balkan Peninsula in ancient times. Regardless of the number of the alternately ruling dynasties, of their tribal affiliation, and of the actual extension of their kingdom, it represented an alliance of Illyrian tribes that united under the rulership of a single leader, expressly referred to as "King of the Illyrians" in ancient historical records (whether in Ancient Greek or in Latin). The monarchic superstructure of the Illyrian state coexisted with the Illyrian tribal communities and the republican system of the Illyrian koina.

The Enchele's polity was the earliest to emerge among Illyrians. The earliest known Illyrian king – Bardylis – emerged in southern Illyria around 400 BC, most likely centered in Dassaretis, a region along Lake Ohrid and east to the Prespa Lakes, located on the border between Macedon and Epirus. He aimed to make Illyria a regional power interfering with Macedon. He united many southern Illyrian tribes under his realm and defeated the Macedonians and Molossians several times, expanding his dominion over Upper Macedonia and Lynkestis and subjugating Macedon for several decades until he was decisively defeated by Philip II of Macedon. Before the Rise of Macedon Illyrians were the dominant power in the area. The kingdom of the Taulantii on the south-eastern coast of the Adriatic evidently reached its apex under Glaukias' rule and dominated southern Illyrian affairs in the late 4th century BC, exerting great influence on the Epirote state through the close ties with the Molossian king Pyrrhus. The Ardiaei, Autariatae, and Dardani are described as the strongest Illyrian peoples by Strabo. From the 6th–5th centuries BC they followed their own social-political development in the regions they inhabited, and only the political entity of the Ardiaei, which expanded in the south-eastern Adriatic, came to be identified with the Illyrian kingdom in the 3rd century BC. Under the Ardiaean king Agron and his wife Teuta, the Illyrian kingdom reached its apex. It became a formidable power both on land and sea by assembling a great army and fleet, and directly ruling over a large area made up of different Illyrian tribes and cities that stretched from the Neretva River in the north to the borders of Epirus in the south, while its influence extended throughout Epirus and down into Acarnania. The Ardiaean realm became one of Rome's major enemies, and its primary threat in the Adriatic Sea. The dominant power of the Illyrian kingdom in the region ceased after its defeat in the Illyro-Roman Wars (229–168 BC). The last known "King of the Illyrians" was Gentius, of the Labeatae tribe.

== History ==
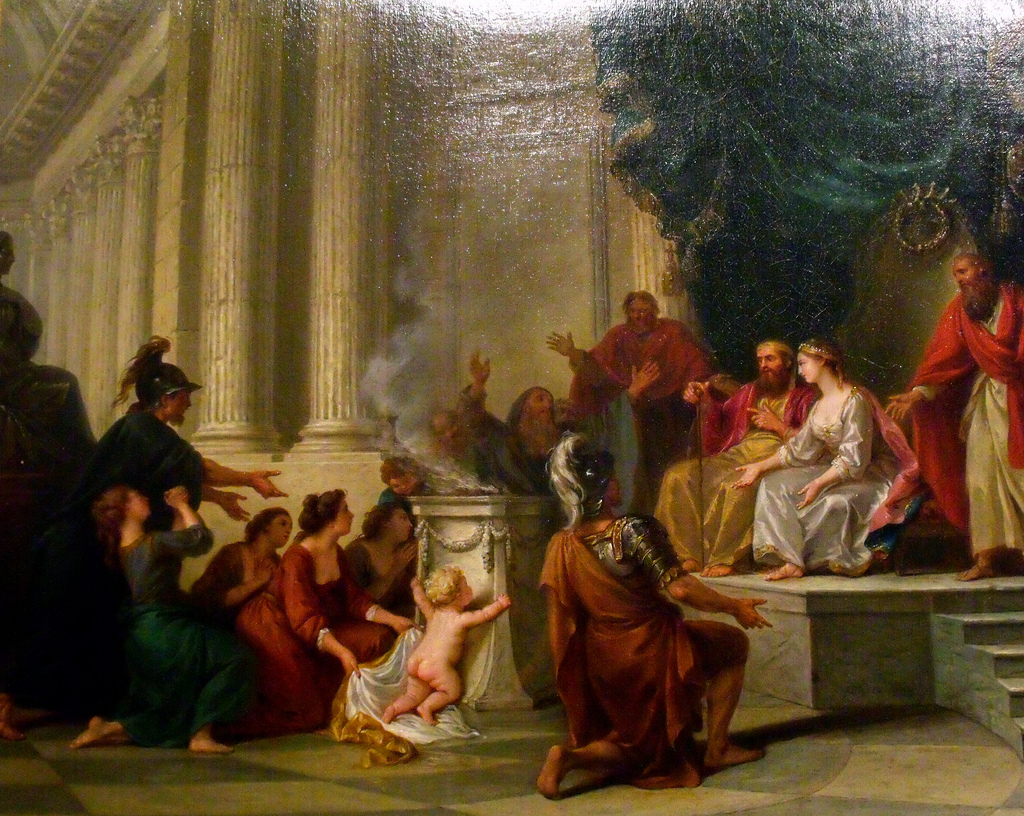
King Pyrrhus when a child, brought before King Glaucia and his wife Queen Beroia – Nicolas-René Jollain, 1779.

In southern Illyria organized realms were formed earlier than in other areas of this region. One of the oldest known Illyrian dynasty is that of the Enchelei, which seems to have reached its height from the 8th–7th centuries BC, but the dynasty fell from dominant power around the 6th century BC. It seems that the weakening of the dynasty of Enchelae resulted in their assimilation and inclusion into a newly established Illyrian realm at the latest in the 5th century BC, marking the arising of the Dassaretii, who appear to have replaced the Enchelei in the Lakeland area of Lychnidus.

The weakening of the Enchelean realm was also caused by the strengthening of another Illyrian dynasty established in its vicinity—that of the Taulantii—which existed for some time along with that of the Enchelei. The Taulantii—another people among the more anciently known groups of Illyrian tribes—lived on the Adriatic coast of southern Illyria (modern Albania), dominating at various times much of the plain between the Drin and the Aous, comprising the area around Epidamnus/Dyrrhachium. When describing the Illyrian invasion of Macedonia ruled by Argaeus I, somewhere between 678–640 BC, the historian Polyaenus (fl. 2nd-century AD) recorded the supposed oldest known king in Illyria, Galaurus or Galabrus, a ruler of the Taulantii who reigned in the latter part of the 7th century BC. Some scholars consider the authenticity of Polyaenus' passage as disputable.

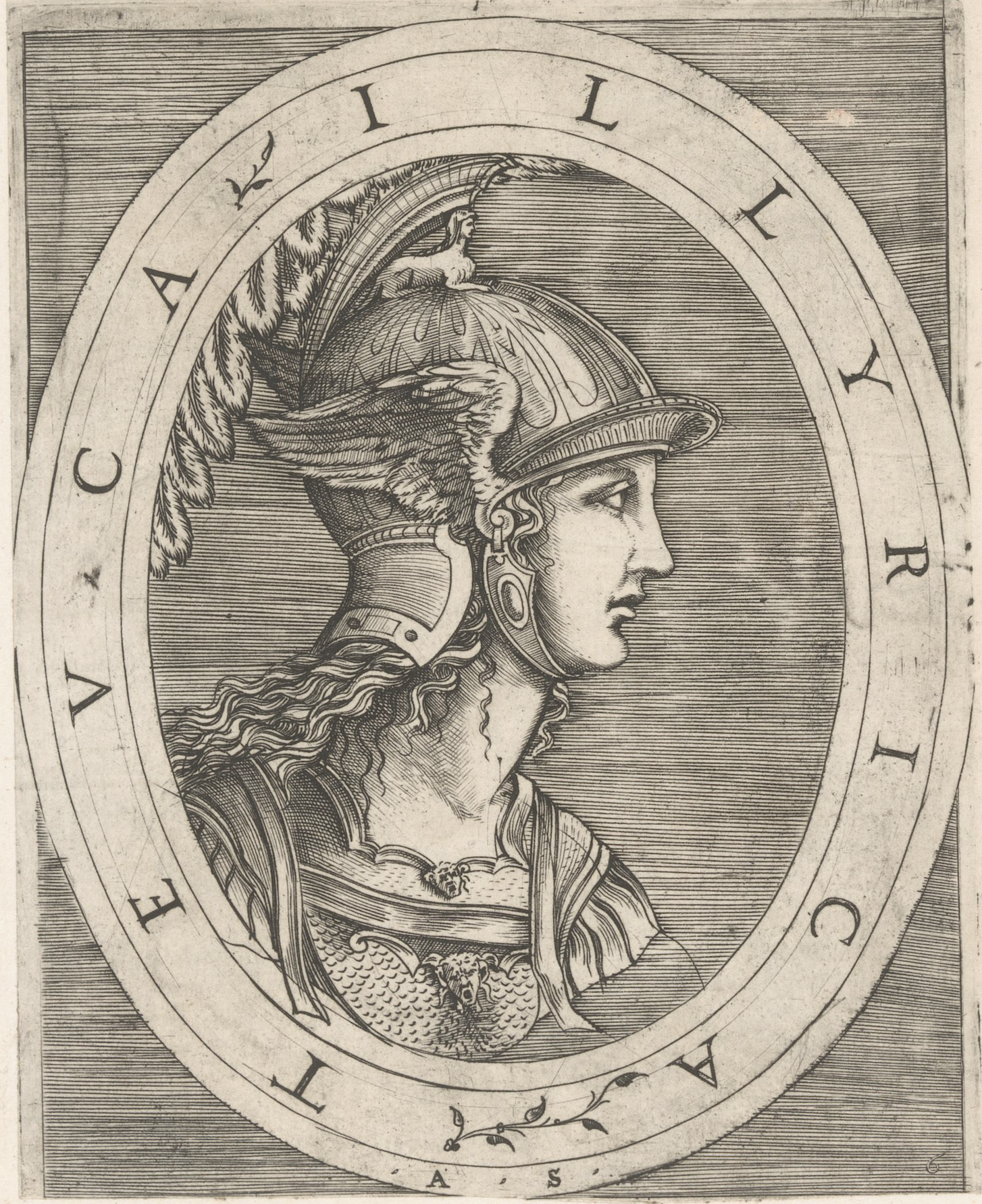
Illyrian Queen Teuta on a 16th-century engraving

Whether or not this account is historically reliable, and despite Polyaenus' interest in the anecdote, it implies the widespread thought throughout antiquity about a significant animosity between the Macedonians and the Illyrians as early as the 7th century BC, if the consensus in modern scholarship in dating the reigning period of Argaeus I is correct. In the 7th century BC the Taulantii invoked the aid of Corcyra and Corinth in a war against the Liburni. After the defeat and expulsion from the region of the Liburni, the Corcyreans founded in 627 BC on the Illyrian mainland a colony called Epidamnus, thought to have been the name of an Illyrian (barbarian) king of the region. A flourishing commercial centre emerged and the city grew rapidly. The Taulantii continued to play an important role in Illyrian history between the 5th and 4th–3rd centuries BC, and in particular, in the history of Epidamnus, both as its neighbours and as part of its population. Notably, they influenced the affairs in the internal conflicts between aristocrats and democrats. The Taulantian dynasty seems to have reached its climax during Glaukias' rule, in the years between 335 BC and 302 BC.

According to some modern scholars the dynasty of Bardylis—the first attested Illyrian dynasty—was Dassaretan. There is also another historical reconstruction that considers Bardylis a Dardani a ruler, who during the expansion of his dominion included the region of Dassaretis in his realm, but this interpretation has been challenged by historians who consider Dardania too far north for the events involving the Illyrian king Bardylis and his dynasty.

After Philip II of Macedon defeated Bardylis (358 BC), the Grabaei under Grabos II became the strongest state in Illyria. Philip II killed 7,000 Illyrians in a great victory and annexed the territory up to Lake Ohrid. Next, Philip II reduced the Grabaei, and then went for the Ardiaei, defeated the Triballi (339 BC), and fought with Pleurias (337 BC). After that Alexander the Great had defeated Illyrian chieftain Clitus forces in 335 B.C. and Illyrian soldiers and tribal leaders participated in his conquest of Persia. After the death of Alexander, Illyrian tribes started to rise to become independent from Macedonian rule. Following that in 312 BC king Glaucius expelled Greeks from Durrës.

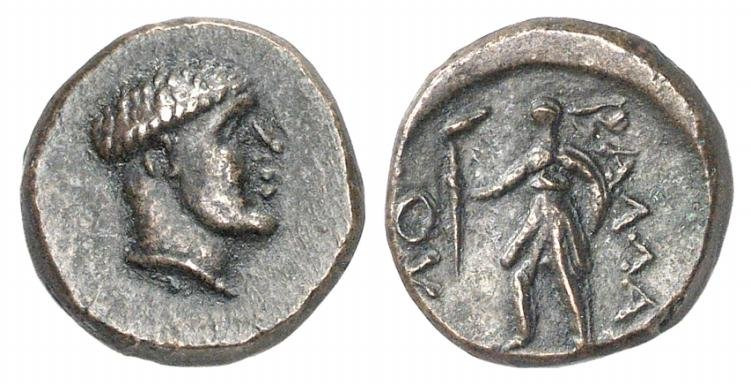
Coins of King Ballaios

During the second part of the 3rd century BC, a number of Illyrian tribes seem to have united to form a proto-state stretching from the central part of present-day Albania up to Neretva river in Herzegovina. The political entity was financed on piracy and ruled from 250 BC by the king Agron. He was succeeded by his wife Teuta, who assumed the regency for her stepson Pinnes following Agron's death in 231 BC. Queen Teuta was famous for having waged wars against the Romans.

At the Neretva Delta, there was a strong Hellenistic influence on the Illyrian tribe of Daors. Their capital was Daorson located in Ošanići near Stolac in Herzegovina, which became the main center of classical Illyrian culture. Daorson, during the 4th century BC, was surrounded by megalithic, 5 meter high stonewalls, composed out of large trapeze stones blocks. Daors also made unique bronze coins and sculptures. The Illyrians even conquered Greek colonies on the Dalmatian islands.

The Illyrian kingdom was composed of small areas within the region of Illyria. Only the Romans ruled the entire region. The internal organization of the south Illyrian kingdom points to imitation of their neighbouring Greek kingdoms and influence from the Greek and Hellenistic world in the growth of their urban centres. Polybius gives as an image of society within an Illyrian kingdom as peasant infantry fought under aristocrats which he calls in Greek Polydynastae (Greek: Πολυδυνάστες) where each one controlled a town within the kingdom. The monarchy was established on hereditary lines and Illyrian rulers used marriages as a means of alliance with other powers. Pliny (23–79 AD) writes that the people that formed the nucleus of the Illyrian kingdom were 'Illyrians proper' or Illyrii proprie dicti. They were the Taulantii, the Pleraei, the Endirudini, Sasaei, Grabaei and the Labeatae. These later joined to form the Docleatae.

The last known King of the Illyrians was Gentius, of the Labeatae tribe, and his capital city was Shkodër.

== Rulers ==
=== 7th century BC rulers ===
- Galaurus: king of Taulantii. Unsuccessfully invaded Macedonia between 678–640 BC. The authenticity of Polyaenus' passage that mentions this early Illyrian king is disputable.

=== 5th-4th centuries BC rulers ===
- Grabos I (5th century BC): attested on an Athenian inscription, he was very likely a person with great political responsibilities. He probably was the grandfather of Grabos II.
- Sirras (437–390 BC), Illyrian or Lynkestian ruler.
- Grabos II (r. 358–356 BC): entered Athenian alliance to resist Philip's power in 356 BC.
- Pleuratus I (r. 356–335 BC): reigned near the Adriatic coast in southern Illyria. In a losing effort in 344 BC, tried to thwart Philip's advances in Illyria.
- Pleurias (r. c. 337/336 BC): Illyrian ruler who campaigned against Philip II about 337 BC. He is considered by some scholars as king of either the Autariatae, the Taulantii, or the Dardani. Some have suggested that he was the same as Pleuratus I; Pleurias is mentioned only in Diodorus (16.93.6), elsewhere unattested in ancient sources.
- Cleitus, son of Bardylis I (r. 335–295 BC): mastermind behind the Illyrian Revolt in Pelion of 335 BC against Alexander the Great.
- Glaucias: king of Taulantii. He aided Cleitus at the Battle of Pelion in 335 BC, raised Pyrrhus of Epirus and was involved in other events in southern Illyria in the late 4th century BC.

=== Early 3rd century BC rulers ===
- Monunius I, (r. 290–270 BC): reigned during the Gallic invasions of 279 BC. He minted his own silver staters in Dyrrhachion.
- Mytilos, successor of Monunius I and probably his son (r. 270–?): waged war on Epirus in 270 BC. He minted his own bronze coins in Dyrrhachion.

=== Ardiaean-Labeatan rulers ===
- Ballaios: ruled from c. 260 – c. 230 BC over the city of Rhizon and surrounding areas;
- Pleuratus II: reigned in a time of peace and prosperity for the Illyrian kingdom., ruled BC 260 ~ BC 250 (before his son Agron)
- Agron of Illyria: reigned from 250 BC to 230 BC (after his father Pleuratus II). In 231 BC, Agron possessed the most powerful land army and navy, of any of the kings who had reigned Illyria before him. He extended the kingdoms' borders in the north and south.
- Queen Teuta (regent for Pinnes): forced to come to terms with the Romans in 227 BC.
- Demetrius of Pharos: surrenders to the Romans at Pharos in 218 BC and flees to Macedonia., ruled B.C 222~B.C 219
- Scerdilaidas: allied with Rome to defeat Macedonia in 208 BC., ruled B.C 218~B.C 206
- Pinnes: too young to become king; ruled under the regency of Teuta, Demetrius and Scerdilaidas., ruled B.C 230~B.C 217
- Pleuratus III: rewarded by the Romans in 196 BC, with lands annexed by the Macedonians., ruled B.C 205~B.C 181
- Gentius: defeated by the Romans in 168 BC during the Third Illyrian War; Illyrian kingdom ceased to exist while the king was taken prisoner., ruled B.C 181~B.C 168

== See also ==
- Illyrology

== Bibliography ==
- Bajric, Amela (2014). "Illyrian Queen Teuta and the Illyrians in Polybius's passage on the Roman mission in Illyria". Vjesnik Arheološkog muzeja u Zagrebu (in Croatian). 46 (1): 29–56.
- Benać, Alojz (1964). "Vorillyrier, Protoillyrier und Urillyrier". Symposium Sur la Délimitation Territoriale et Chronologique des Illyriens à l'Epoque Préhistorique. Sarajevo: Naučno društvo SR Bosne i Hercegovine: 59–94.
- Boak, Arthur Edward Romilly; Sinnigen, William Gurnee (1977), A History of Rome to A.D. 565, Macmillan, ISBN 9780024108005
- Boardman, John (1982), The Cambridge Ancient History, Volume III, Part I: The Prehistory of the Balkans; the Middle East and the Aegean World, Tenth to Eighth Centuries B.C., Cambridge, United Kingdom: Cambridge University Press, ISBN 0-521-22496-9
- Boardman, John; Hammond, Nicholas Geoffrey Lemprière (1982), The Cambridge Ancient History: The Expansion of the Greek World, Eighth to Six Centuries B.C, Cambridge, United Kingdom: Cambridge University Press, ISBN 0-521-23447-6
- Cabanes, Pierre (1988). Les illyriens de Bardulis à Genthios (IVe–IIe siècles avant J.-C.) [The Illyrians from Bardylis to Gentius (4th – 2nd century BC)] (in French). Paris: SEDES. ISBN 2718138416.
- Cabanes, Pierre (2002a) [1988]. Dinko Čutura; Bruna Kuntić-Makvić (eds.). Iliri od Bardileja do Gencia (IV. – II. stoljeće prije Krista) [The Illyrians from Bardylis to Gentius (4th – 2nd century BC)] (in Croatian). Translated by Vesna Lisičić. Svitava. ISBN 953-98832-0-2.
- Cabanes, Perre (2002b). "Taulantii". In Hubert, Cancik; Schneider, Helmuth; Salazar, Christine F.; Orton, David E. (eds.). Brill's New Pauly: Sym–Tub. Brill's New Pauly. Vol. 14. Brill. ISBN 9004142193.
- Ceka, Neritan (2005), The Illyrians to the Albanians, Publ. House Migjeni, ISBN 99943-672-2-6
- Ceka, Olgita (2023). Territorial, political and architectural organisation of koina during the Hellenistic period in Southern Illyria. The example of Byllis (PhD). TU Darmstadt.
- Dzino, Danijel (2014). "'Illyrians' in ancient ethnographic discourse". Dialogues d'histoire ancienne. 40 (2): 45–65. doi:10.3917/dha.402.0045.
- Elsie, Robert (2015). "The Early History of Albania" (PDF). Keeping an Eye on the Albanians: Selected Writings in the Field of Albanian Studies. Albanian Studies. Vol. 16. ISBN 978-1-5141-5726-8.
- Evans, Arthur John (1883–1885). "Antiquarian Researches in Illyricum, I-IV (Communicated to the Society of Antiquaries of London)". Archaeologia. Westminster: Nichols & Sons.
- Evans, Arthur John (1878), Illyrian Letters, Longmans, Green, and Co, ISBN 1-4021-5070-9
- Greenwalt, William S. (2011). "Macedonia, Illyria and Epirus". In Roisman, Joseph; Worthington, Ian (eds.). A Companion to Ancient Macedonia. John Wiley & Sons. pp. 279–305. ISBN 978-1-4443-5163-7.
- Hammond, Nicholas Geoffrey Lemprière (1966). "The Kingdoms in Illyria circa 400-167 B.C.". The Annual of the British School at Athens. 61. British School at Athens: 239–253. doi:10.1017/S0068245400019043. JSTOR 30103175. S2CID 164155370.
- Hammond, N. G. L (1993). Studies concerning Epirus and Macedonia before Alexander. Hakkert. ISBN 9789025610500.
- Hammond, N. G. L. (1994). "Illyrians and North-west Greeks". The Cambridge Ancient History Volume 6: The Fourth Century BC. Cambridge University Press: 422–443. doi:10.1017/CHOL9780521233484.017. ISBN 9781139054331.
- Hammond, Nicholas Geoffrey Lemprière; Griffith, Guy Thompson (1972). A history of Macedonia. Vol. 2. Clarendon Press. ISBN 9780198148142.
- Howe, Timothy; Müller, Sabine; Stoneman, Richard (2017). Ancient Historiography On War and Empire. Oxbow Books. ISBN 978-1785703027.
- Imamovic, Enver. "On elements of political organization of illyrian communities". 'Prilozi', 30, Sarajevo, 2001., pages. 25-41.
- Jaupaj, Lavdosh (2019). Etudes des interactions culturelles en aire Illyro-épirote du VII au III siècle av. J.-C (Thesis). Université de Lyon; Instituti i Arkeologjisë (Albanie).
- Juka, S. S. (1984), Kosova: The Albanians in Yugoslavia in Light of Historical Documents: An Essay, Waldon Press, ISBN 9780961360108
- Kipfer, Barbara Ann (2000). Encyclopedic Dictionary of Archaeology. New York, New York: Kluwer Academic/Plenum Publishers. ISBN 0-306-46158-7.
- Lane Fox, R. (2011). "Philip of Macedon: Accession, Ambitions, and Self-Presentation". In Lane Fox, R. (ed.). Brill's Companion to Ancient Macedon: Studies in the Archaeology and History of Macedon, 650 BC – 300 AD. Leiden: Brill. pp. 335–366. ISBN 978-90-04-20650-2.
- Mortensen, Kate (1991). "The Career of Bardylis". The Ancient World. Vol. 22. Ares Publishers. pp. 49–59.
- Papazoglu, Fanula (1978). The Central Balkan Tribes in Pre-Roman Times: Triballi, Autariatae, Dardanians, Scordisci and Moesians. Amsterdam, the Netherlands: Adolf M. Hakkert. ISBN 90-256-0793-4.
- Šašel Kos, Marjeta (2002). "Pyrrhus and Illyrian Kingdom(s?)". Greek Influence Along the East Adriatic Coast. Knjiga Mediterana. 26: 101–119. ISBN 9531631549.
- Šašel Kos, Marjeta (2004). "Mythological stories concerning Illyria and its name". In P. Cabanes; J.-L. Lamboley (eds.). L'Illyrie méridionale et l'Epire dans l'Antiquité. Vol. 4. pp. 493–504.
- Šašel Kos, Marjeta (2012), "Teuta, Illyrian queen", The Encyclopedia of Ancient History, Wiley-Blackwell, doi:10.1002/9781444338386.wbeah09233, ISBN 978-1-4443-3838-6
- Shehi, Eduard (2023). "Archaic, Classical, and Roman Pottery". In Galaty, Michael L.; Bejko, Lorenc (eds.). Archaeological Investigations in a Northern Albanian Province: Results of the Projekti Arkeologjik i Shkodrës (PASH): Volume Two: Artifacts and Artifact Analysis. Memoirs Series. Vol. 64. University of Michigan Press. ISBN 9781951538699.
- Stipčević, Aleksandar (1976). "Simbolismo illirico e simbolismo albanese: appunti introduttivi". Iliria (in Italian). 5: 233–236. doi:10.3406/iliri.1976.1234.
- Stipčević, Aleksandar (1977), The Illyrians: History and Culture, Noyes Press, ISBN 978-0-8155-5052-5
- Stipčević, Alexander (1989). Iliri: povijest, život, kultura. Zagreb: Školska knjiga. ISBN 9788603991062.
- Strauss, Barry (2009), The Spartacus War, Simon and Schuster, ISBN 978-1-4165-3205-7
- Wilkes, J. J. (1968). Dalmatia. Harvard University Press. ISBN 9780674189508.
- Wilkes, John J. (1969). History of the Provinces of the Roman Empire. London, United Kingdom: Routledge and Kegan Paul.
- Wilkes, J. J. (1992). The Illyrians. Blackwell. ISBN 06-3119-807-5.
- Wilkes, John J. (1995). The Illyrians. Oxford, United Kingdom: Blackwell Publishers Limited. ISBN 0-631-19807-5.
