= King Agron =

King Agron may refer to:

- Agron of Illyria, King of the Ardiaean dynasty (Illyrian Kingdom) from 250 to 231 BC
- Agron of Lydia, legendary fourth King of Maeonia
