= List of Illyrians =

Conglomeration of Indo-European peoples and tribes in the Balkan Peninsula

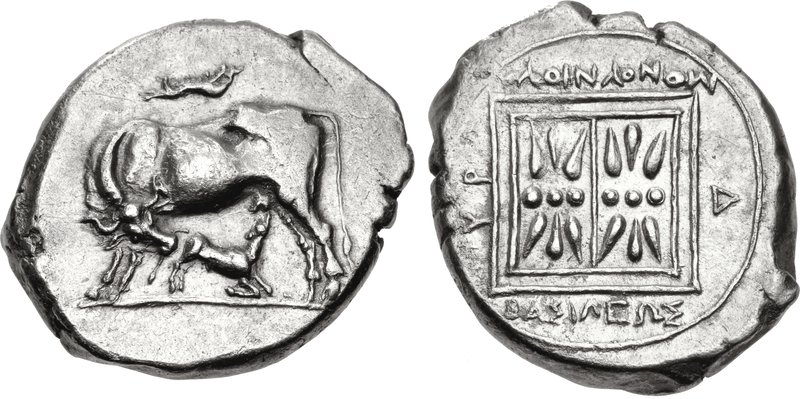
Coin of Monunius I (290-270 BCE)

The Illyrians (Illyrioi; Latin: Illyrii) were a conglomeration of Indo-European peoples and tribes in the Balkan Peninsula, Southeastern Europe. They spoke the Illyrian language and practiced a multitude of common religious and cultural practices. Many Illyrian groups formed a distinct tribal mode of social organisation, which survived much later in the form of the Albanian tribal system.

In late Iron Age and early classical antiquity, the first polities of the area would be created by tribal groupings, including the Taulantii and Dardani. The most powerful Illyrian states of the area, the Ardiaean kingdom, emerged in the 3rd century BC during the rule of Agron and Teuta. The Illyrians came into conflict with Roman Republic and were defeated in the Illyrian Wars, which were followed by many revolts. The largest and last of them was the Great Illyrian Revolt (6-9 BC). The beginning of the integration of the region of Illyria in the Roman world followed the revolt and saw many Illyrians rise through the ranks of the Roman society and the Roman army in particular which produced several emperors of Illyrian origin.

== A ==
Name	Title	Date	Description
Agron	Ruler	Ruled from c. 250 BC to 230 BC	In 231 BC, Agron possessed the most powerful land army and navy, of any of the kings who had reigned before him. He extended the kingdoms' borders in the north and south.
Anastasius I	Emperor	Lived from c. 431 AD to 518 AD	Anastasius I was the Emperor of the Byzantine Empire from 491 to 518.
Artas	Ruler	Ruled from c. 430 BC to 413 BC	Artas was a ruler of Messapia. He supplied the Athenians with one hundred and fifty javelin-throwers in 413 BC for the war against Syracuse.
Astius	Bishop	Died in c. 98 AD	Astius was a bishop in the city of Dyrrachium.
Audata	Queen	Ruled from c. 359 BC to 336 BC	Audata was related to Bardylis and wife of Philip II of Macedon.
Aurelian	Emperor	Lived from c. 214 AD to 275 AD	Aurelian was the Emperor of the Roman Empire from 270 to 275.

== B ==
Name	Title	Date	Description
Ballaios	Ruler	Ruled from c. 260 BC to 230 BC	Ballaios ruled over the eastern Adriatic with capital at Rhizon. He is attested only from silver and bronze coinage, found abundantly along both coasts of the Adriatic. He is considered as the predecessor of Agron.
Bardylis	Ruler	Lived from c. 448 BC to 358 BC	Bardylis was the founder of the first attested Illyrian dynasty. Macedonian campaigns proved successful in 393, 372 and 359 BC and invaded Epirus in alliance with Dionysius of Syracuse.
Bardylis II	Ruler	Ruled from c. 295 BC to 290 BC	Bardyllis II was the son of Cleitus (r. 295–290 BC). He managed to re-create the state of his grandfather in the region of Dassaretis to the west of the Lynkestian lake.
Bato the Breuci	Ruler	Born between c. 35 BC to 30 BC	Bato surrendered to Tiberius in 8 AD on the bank of the Bosna river.
Bato the Daesitiate	Ruler	Born between c. 35 BC to 30 BC	Bato was defeated by the Romans in 9 AD during the Great Illyrian Revolt; end of final Illyrian resistance to Roman occupation.
Bato the Dardanian	Ruler	Ruled from c. 206 BC to 176 BC	Bato clashed with Ancient Macedonia in 199 BC, in order to liberate Paeonia.
Bircenna	Queen	Ruled from c. 292 BC to 272 BC	Bircenna was the daughter of Bardylis II and a wife of Pyrrhus of Epirus.

== C ==
Name	Title	Date	Description
Caeria	Queen	Died in 344 BC or 343 BC	Caeria was an Illyrian queen, who reigned in the 4th century BC.
Caius	Pope	Served from 17 December 283 to 22 April 296	In accordance with Christian tradition, Caius is a native from Dalmatia and a relative of Diocletian.
Constantine the Great	Emperor	Lived from 25 July 306 to 22 May 337	Flavius Valerius Constantinus was the Emperor of the Roman Empire from 306 to 337.
Constantius II	Emperor	Lived from 7 August 317 to 3 November 361	Flavius Julius Constantius was the Emperor of the Roman Empire from 337 to 361.

== D ==
Name	Title	Date	Description
Diocletian	Emperor	Lived from 22 December 242/245 to 3 December 311/312	Gaius Aurelius Valerius Diocletianus was born in Dalmatia and served as the emperor of the Roman Empire from 284 to 305.

== E ==
Name	Title	Date	Description
Etuta	Queen	Ruled from c. 169 BC to 168 BC	Etuta was the wife of Gentius.

== I ==
Name	Title	Date	Description
Irenaeus	Bishop	Died in 304 AD	Irenaeus was a bishop in Sirmium, Pannonia.

== J ==
Name	Title	Date	Description
Jerome	Priest	Lived from c. 342 or 347 to 420	Early Church Farther credited for translating the Bible into Latin
Jovian	Emperor	Lived from 331 to 364	Flavius Jovianus was the Emperor of the Roman Empire from 363 to 364.
Justin I	Emperor	Lived from 2 February 450 to 1 August 527	Flavius Iustinus was the Emperor of the Byzantine Empire from 518 to 527.
Justinian the Great	Emperor	Lived from 11 May 482 to 14 November 565	Flavius Petrus Sabbatius Iustinianus was the Emperor of the Byzantine Empire from 527 to 565.

== K ==
Name	Title	Date	Description
Kratill Mahata	Gymnasiarch	fl. 3rd century BC	A gymnasiarch from the ancient illyrian city of Nikaia who lived in the 3rd century BC.

== M ==
Name	Title	Date	Description
Mark Lugari	Schoolteacher	fl. late 3rd century and early 2nd century BC	A schoolteacher from the ancient city of Apollonia (Illyria) who lived in the late 3rd century and early 2nd century BC.

== S ==
Name	Title	Date	Description
Sabinianus Magnus	military leader	fl. 5th century CE	General of the Eastern Roman Empire(magister militum per Illyricum), who fought in the rebellion of Theodoric Strabo against Emperor Zeno.
Sabinianus	military and political leader	fl. 505-508	Son of Sabinianus Magnus. Consul and magister militum per Illyricum.

== T ==
Name	Title	Date	Description
Teuta	Ruler	Ruled from c. 231 BC to 228/227 BC	Teuta was the spouse of Agron and the ruler of the Ardiaei tribe upon Agron's death.

== V ==
Name	Title	Date	Description
Valens	Emperor	Lived from 328 to 378	Flavius Valens was the Emperor of the Roman Empire from 364 to 378. He was born into an Illyrian family in Cibalae, Pannonia Secunda.
Valentinian I	Emperor	Lived from 3 July 321 to 17 November 375	Flavius Valentinianus was the Emperor of the Roman Empire from 364 to 375. He was born into an Illyrian family in Cibalae, Pannonia Secunda.
Valentinian II	Emperor	Lived from 371 to 392	Flavius Valentinianus II was the Emperor of the Roman Empire from 375 to 392.

== Historical rulers ==
=== Enchelean-Taulantian rulers ===
- Galaurus: king of Taulantii. Unsuccessfully invaded Macedonia between 678 and 640 BC.
- Grabos I (5th century BC): attested on an Athenian inscription, he was very likely a person with great political responsibilities. He probably was the grandfather of Grabos II.
- Sirras (437–390 BC), ruler in Lyncestis.
- Grabos II (r. 358–356 BC): entered Athenian alliance to resist Philip's power in 356 BC.
- Pleuratus I (r. 356–335 BC): reigned near the Adriatic coast in southern Illyria. In a losing effort in 344 BC, tried to thwart Philip's advances in Illyria.
- Pleurias (r. c. 337/336 BC): Illyrian ruler who campaigned against Philip II about 337 BC. He is considered by some scholars as king of either the Autariatae, the Taulantii, or the Dardani. Some have suggested that he was the same as Pleuratus I; Pleurias is mentioned only in Diodorus (16.93.6), elsewhere unattested in ancient sources.
- Cleitus, son of Bardylis I (r. 335–295 BC): mastermind behind the Illyrian Revolt in Pelion of 335 BC against Alexander the Great.
- Glaucias: king of Taulantii. He aided Cleitus at the Battle of Pelion in 335 BC, raised Pyrrhus of Epirus and was involved in other events in southern Illyria in the late 4th century BC.
- Monunius I, (r. 290–270 BC): reigned during the Gallic invasions of 279 BC. He minted his own silver staters in Dyrrhachion.
- Mytilos, successor of Monunius I and probably his son (r. 270–?): waged war on Epirus in 270 BC. He minted his own bronze coins in Dyrrhachion.

== Ardiaean-Labeatan rulers ==
- Pleuratus II: reigned in a time of peace and prosperity for the Illyrian kingdom., ruled BC 260 ~ BC 250
- Teuta (regent for Pinnes): forced to come to terms with the Romans in 227 BC.
- Demetrius of Pharos: surrenders to the Romans at Pharos in 218 BC and flees to Macedonia., ruled B.C 222~B.C 219
- Scerdilaidas: allied with Rome to defeat Macedonia in 208 BC., ruled B.C 218~B.C 206
- Pinnes: too young to become king; ruled under the regency of Teuta, Demetrius and Scerdilaidas., ruled B.C 230~B.C 217
- Pleuratus III: rewarded by the Romans in 196 BC, with lands annexed by the Macedonians., ruled B.C 205~B.C 181
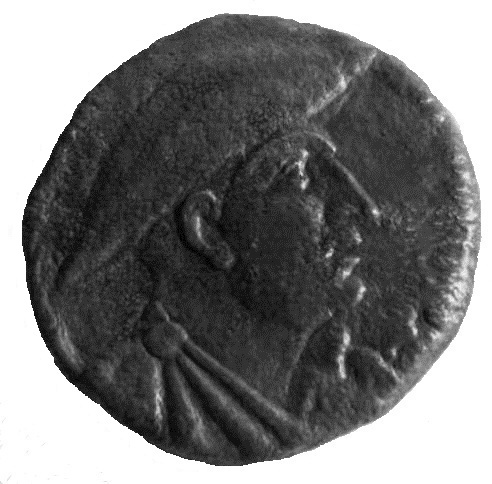
- Coin of Gentius.
  Gentius: defeated by the Romans in 168 BC during the Third Illyrian War; Illyrian kingdom ceased to exist while the king was taken prisoner., ruled B.C 181~B.C 168

== Dardanian rulers ==
- Longarus: invaded northern borders of the Illyrian kingdom in 229 BC while Teuta was dealing with campaigns in Epirus.
- Bato of Dardania fought alongside the Romans against Macedon during the Second Macedonian War. Bato is known for using advanced war tactics against Athenagoras.
- Monunius of Dardania: repelled the Bastarnae Invasion of Dardania in 175 BC.

== Other rulers ==
Histria

- Epulon, ruler of Histria: thwarted Roman advances in the Istrian peninsula until his death in 177 BC.

Dalmatae

- Verzo, ruler of the Dalmatae: took the city of Promona from the Liburni in order to ambush Octavian in 34 BC.
- Testimos, ruler of the Dalmatae: defeated by the Romans in 33 BC; Dalmatia incorporated into Roman Republic.

Messapia

- Opis of Messapia: attacked by Taras in 460 BC at Hyria, in which he died.

Pannonia

- Pinnes of Pannonia: led Pannonians in the Great Illyrian Revolt from 6 AD.

Minor rulers

- Ionios (king): ruled over Issa and the surrounding region in the first half of the 4th century BC, probably after the fall of Dionysius of Syracuse in 367 BC.
- Caeria: Illyrian queen who ruled to 344/343BC.

== See also ==
- List of ancient Illyrian peoples and tribes
- List of settlements in Illyria

== Bibliography ==
- Bilić, Tomislav (2020). "Greek-Illyrian coinage of the central Adriatic region: an overview". TEME. 2 (LATINA & GRAECA – NOVA SERIJA 38): 7–20. ISSN 1820-7804.
- Cabanes, Pierre (2002) [1988]. Dinko Čutura; Bruna Kuntić-Makvić (eds.). Iliri od Bardileja do Gencia (IV. – II. stoljeće prije Krista) [The Illyrians from Bardylis to Gentius (4th – 2nd century BC)] (in Croatian). Translated by Vesna Lisičić. Svitava. ISBN 953-98832-0-2.
- Croke, Brian; Marcellin, Ammien (2001). Count Marcellinus and his chronicle. Oxford University Press. ISBN 0198150016.
- Dyczek, Piotr (2019). "Illyrian King Ballaios, King Agron and Queen Teuta from ancient Rhizon". ANODOS Studies of the Ancient World (13/2013). Trnavská univerzita v Trnave, Filozofcká fakulta: 195–202. ISSN 1338-5410.
- Galaty, Michael L. (2002). "Modeling the Formation and Evolution of an Illyrian Tribal System: Ethnographic and Archaeological Analogs". In William A. Parkinson (ed.). The Archaeology of Tribal Societies. Berghahn Books. ISBN 1789201713.
- Howe, Timothy; Müller, Sabine; Stoneman, Richard (2017). Ancient Historiography On War and Empire. Oxbow Books. ISBN 978-1785703027.
- Šašel Kos, Marjeta (2002). "Pyrrhus and Illyrian Kingdom(s?)". Greek Influence Along the East Adriatic Coast. Knjiga Mediterana. 26: 101–119. ISBN 9531631549.
- Villar, Francisco (1996). Los indoeuropeos y los orígenes de Europa (in Spanish). Madrid: Gredos. ISBN 84-249-1787-1.
