= Galaurus =

Illyrian king

- Reign: 678–640 BC
- Predecessor: unknown
- Successor: unknown
- Dynasty: Taulantii

Galaurus (fl. 678–640 BC) was an Illyrian king of the Taulantii State who reigned in the middle of the 7th century BC. After the first Illyrian invasion of Macedonia in 691 BC because of the interruption of friendly relations, the Illyrians did considerable damage by their ravages. Galaurus invaded Macedonia somewhere between 678–640 BC during the reign of Argaeus I. However the invasion was unsuccessful because Argaeus cut off great numbers and forced the remaining Illyrians to leave, although further invasions continued right to the time of Philip II.

The historian Polyaenus relates this battle:

"In the reign of Argaeus, the Illyrian Taulantii under Galaurus invaded Macedonia. Argaeus, whose force was very small, directed the Macedonian virgins (parthenoi), as the enemy advanced, to show themselves from mount Ereboea (Ἐρέβοια). They accordingly did so; and in a numerous body they poured down, covered by wreaths, and brandishing their thyrsi instead of spears. Galaurus, intimidated by the numbers of those, whom instead of women he supposed to be men, sounded a retreat; whereupon the Taulantii, throwing away their weapons, and whatever else might retard their escape, abandoned themselves to a precipitate flight. Argaeus, having thus obtained a victory without the hazard of a battle, erected a temple to Dionysus Pseudanor; and ordered the priestesses of the god, who were before called Klοdones by the Macedonians, to ever afterwards be distinguished by the title of Mimallones."

== See also ==
- Illyrian kingdom
- List of rulers of Illyria

== Bibliography ==
- Cabanes, Perre (2002). "Taulantii". In Hubert, Cancik; Schneider, Helmuth; Salazar, Christine F.; Orton, David E. (eds.). Brill's New Pauly: Sym–Tub. Brill's New Pauly. Vol. 14. Brill. ISBN 9004142193.
- Jaupaj, Lavdosh (2019). Etudes des interactions culturelles en aire Illyro-épirote du VII au III siècle av. J.-C (Thesis). Université de Lyon; Instituti i Arkeologjisë (Albanie).
