= Teuta (name) =

Female given name

Teuta is an Albanian feminine given name, derived from an Illyrian word or title meaning "people".

People bearing the name include:

- Teuta, Illyrian Queen
- Teuta Arifi (born 1969), Macedonian politician of Albanian origin
- Teuta Cuni (born 1973), retired Swedish boxer
- Teuta Krasniqi (born 1982), Kosovo Albanian actress
- Teuta Kurti (born 1986), Kosovo Albanian singer
- Teuta Matoshi, Kosovo Albanian fashion designer
- Teuta Selimi (born 1976), Kosovo Albanian singer
- Teuta Topi (born 1961), former First Lady of Albania

== Other ==
- KFF Teuta, an Albanian women's football club
- KF Teuta B, an Albanian football club
- KF Teuta Durrës, an Albanian football team
- BC Teuta Durrës, an Albanian basketball team
- Teuta Vissarion, the eponymous character of Bram Stoker's 1909 novel The Lady of the Shroud
