= Ardiaei =

Illyrian tribe

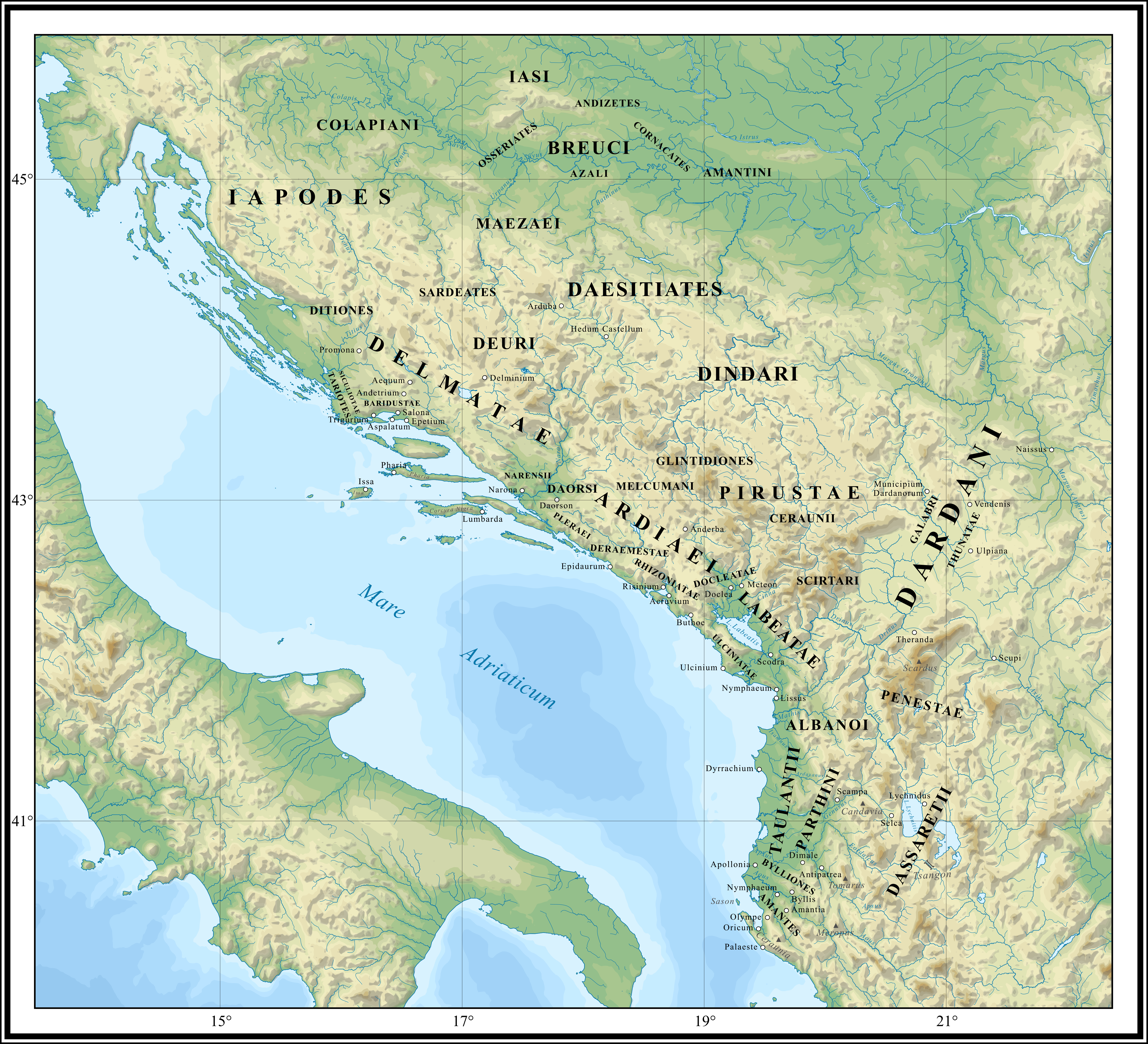
The Adriaei with other Illyrian tribes in the 1st–2nd centuries AD

The Ardiaei (Note: Their name was written in Ancient Greek as Ἀρδιαῖοι, Ardiaioi, or Οὐαρδαῖοι, Ouardaioi, and in Latin as Vardiaei or Vardaei.) were an Illyrian people who resided in the territory of present-day Bosnia and Herzegovina, Albania, Kosovo, Montenegro, and Croatia between the Adriatic coast on the south, Konjic on the north, along the Neretva river and its right bank on the west, and extending to Lake Shkodra to the southeast. From the 3rd century BC to 168 BC the capital cities of the Ardiaean State were Rhizon and Scodra.

The Ardiaean kingdom was transformed into a formidable power—both on land and sea—under the leadership of Agron of Illyria. During this time, Agron captured parts of Epirus, Corcyra, Epidamnos, and Pharos in succession, establishing garrisons there. The Ardiaean realm became one of Rome's major enemies, and the primary threat to it in the Adriatic Sea. A series of wars were fought between the Roman Republic and the Illyrian (Ardiaean-Labaeatan) kingdom in the 3rd–2nd centuries BC. Polybius (203 BC–120 BC) wrote that they were subdued by the Romans in 229 BC. The Epitome of Livy reports the Roman consul Fulvius Flaccus put down an uprising in 135 BC undertaken by Ardiaei and Pleraei in Roman Illyria.

In earlier times, the Ardiaei were enemies of the Autariatae for a long period over salt sources. Appian (95–165) wrote that the Ardiaei were destroyed by the Autariatae and that in contrast to the Autariatae they had maritime power.

== Name ==
=== Attestation ===
The Ardiaei are attested since the 3rd century BC. They often appear in ancient accounts describing the Illyrian Wars and Macedonian Wars. Their name was written in Ancient Greek as Ἀρδιαῖοι, Ardiaioi, or Οὐαρδαῖοι, Ouardaioi, and in Latin as Vardiaei or Vardaei.

=== Etymology ===
According to Elsie, the tribal name Ardiaei may be related to the Latin ardea meaning "heron", a symbol of animal totemism. However, the presence of an initial V in the name calls this proposal into question.

== Location ==
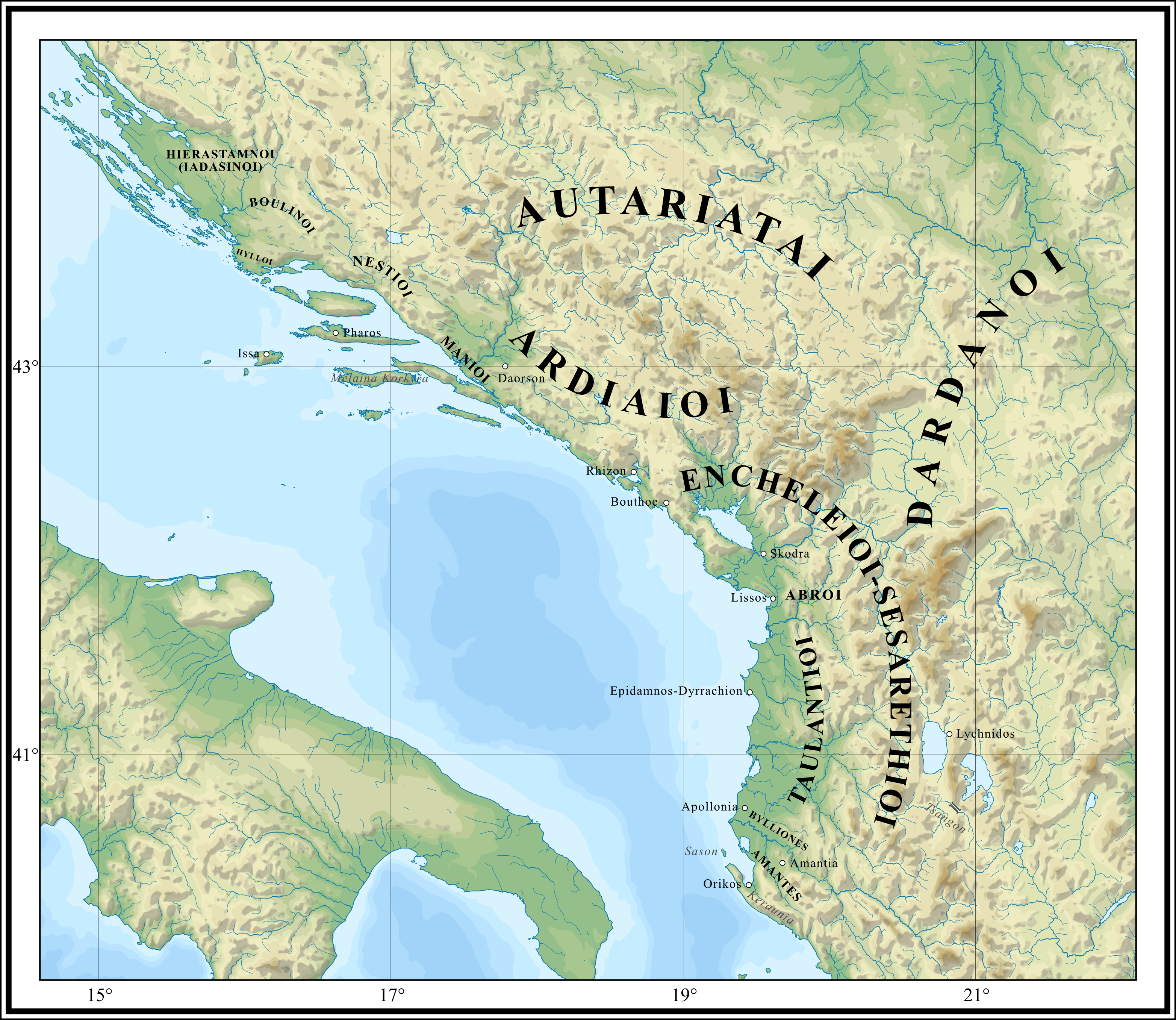
Illyrian tribes in the 7th–4th centuries BCE.

Accounts in ancient sources create much confusion about the original location of the Ardiaei. Up to the 4th century BC, the Ardiaei were not a coastal people, as they were described by later Roman historiography from the mid-3rd century BC onwards. Their inland location in older times can be inferred by the cause of war between them and the Autariatae – a long-running conflict over the possession of salt sources near their common border. If they had inhabited the Adriatic coastal area, they would not have had such a pronounced need to undertake a dangerous war because of the mountain salt springs.

The arrival of the Ardiaei on the coast must have occurred at some time after the mid-4th century BC, as the Periplus of Pseudo-Skylax dating back to that time does not mention this Illyrian tribe at all. At that time the lower course of the Naro river was inhabited by the Manioi, while the middle course was likely inhabited by the Ardiaei. The territory of the Ardiaei and Autariatae must have met somewhere along the upper Naro valley near the 'Great Lake', which was attested in the Periplus and has been identified with Hutovo Blato. The Autariatae most likely inhabited the other side of the lake. During the 2nd century BC the Manioi disappeared from historical sources, being replaced in some of their former regions by the Ardiaei and Daorsi, while some of the earlier Autariatan territories were inhabited by the Narensii. Their tribal name indicates that Narensii certainly inhabited some of the areas along the Naron river, and that they probably appeared in historical sources after the disintegration of the coalition that was dominated by the Autariatae.

In the 3rd century BC, the Ardiaei attained political importance and conquered territories from the Autariatae until they acquired control of the entire Adriatic coast, from the region of the Daorsi at the mouth of the Naro river down to Labeatae around Lake Scodra. It is possible that at that time their capital was in Rhizon in present-day Montenegro. In Roman times the Ardiaei were attested in the area of southern Illyria that was centered around the Bay of Kotor, with Rhizon as a capital city, expanding from the Naro river in present-day Bosnia and Herzegovina and Croatia, along the Adriatic coast southwards to Scodra (another capital of the Illyrian kingdom) in present-day Albania, as well as to the broad region of Lissus.

== History ==
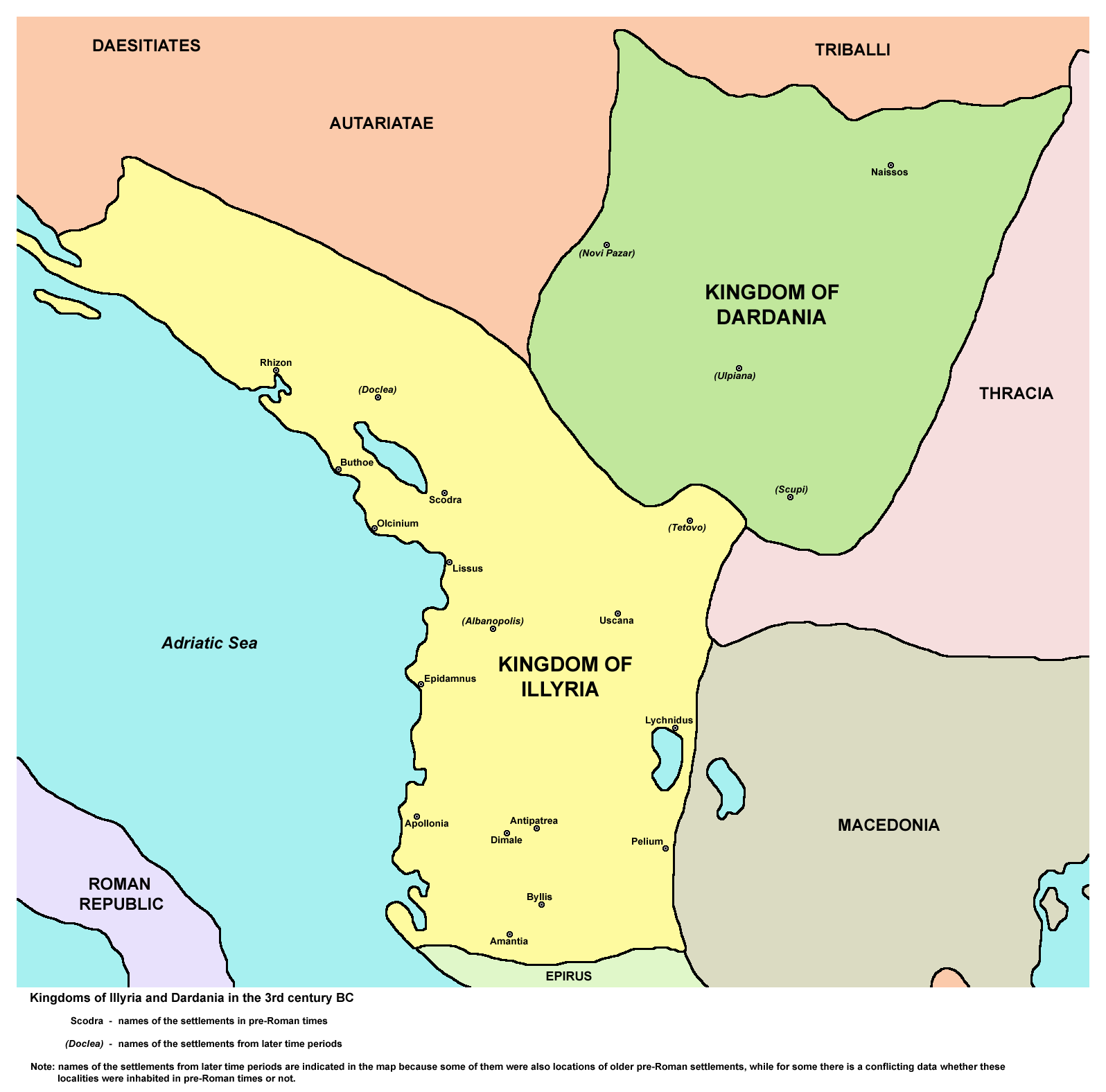
Approximate extension of the Illyrian (Ardiaean) realm under King Agron's rule in the 3rd century BC.

Ardiaei and other Illyrian tribes were protecting their homelands and resisting to the Romans expansion in Adriatic, so the Romans campaigned against them in the Illyrian Wars. They were viewed as fierce warriors by the Greeks.

In earlier times the Ardiaei feuded with the Autariatae over a salt source near a shared border. The Ardiaei briefly attained military might in 230 B.C. under the reign of king Agron (an Ardiaean by tribal origin). His widow, Queen Teuta, attempted to gain a foothold in the Adriatic but failed due to Roman intervention. Historic accounts hold that King Agron was hired by King Demetrius II to repel the invasion of Macedonia by the invading Aetolians. The Ardiaei had 20 decuriae. (Note: A group of ten men.)

The ancient geographer Strabo listed the Ardiaei as one of the three strongest Illyrian peoples – the other two being the Autariatae and the Dardani. Strabo writes;

“Because they pestered the sea through their piratical bands, the Romans pushed them back from it into the interior and forced them to till the soil. But the country is rough and poor and not suited to a farming population, and therefore the tribe has been utterly ruined and in fact has almost been obliterated. And this is what befell the rest of the peoples in that part of the world; for those who were most powerful in earlier times were utterly humbled or were obliterated, as, for example, among the Galatae the Boii and the Scordistae, and among the Illyrians the Autariatae, Ardiaei, and Dardanii, and among the Thracians the Triballi; that is, they were reduced in warfare by one another at first and then later by the Macedonians and the Romans.”

King Agron, son of Pleuratus who belonged to the ruling house of the Ardiaei, disposed of the most powerful forces, both by land and sea, of any of the kings who had reigned in Illyria before him.

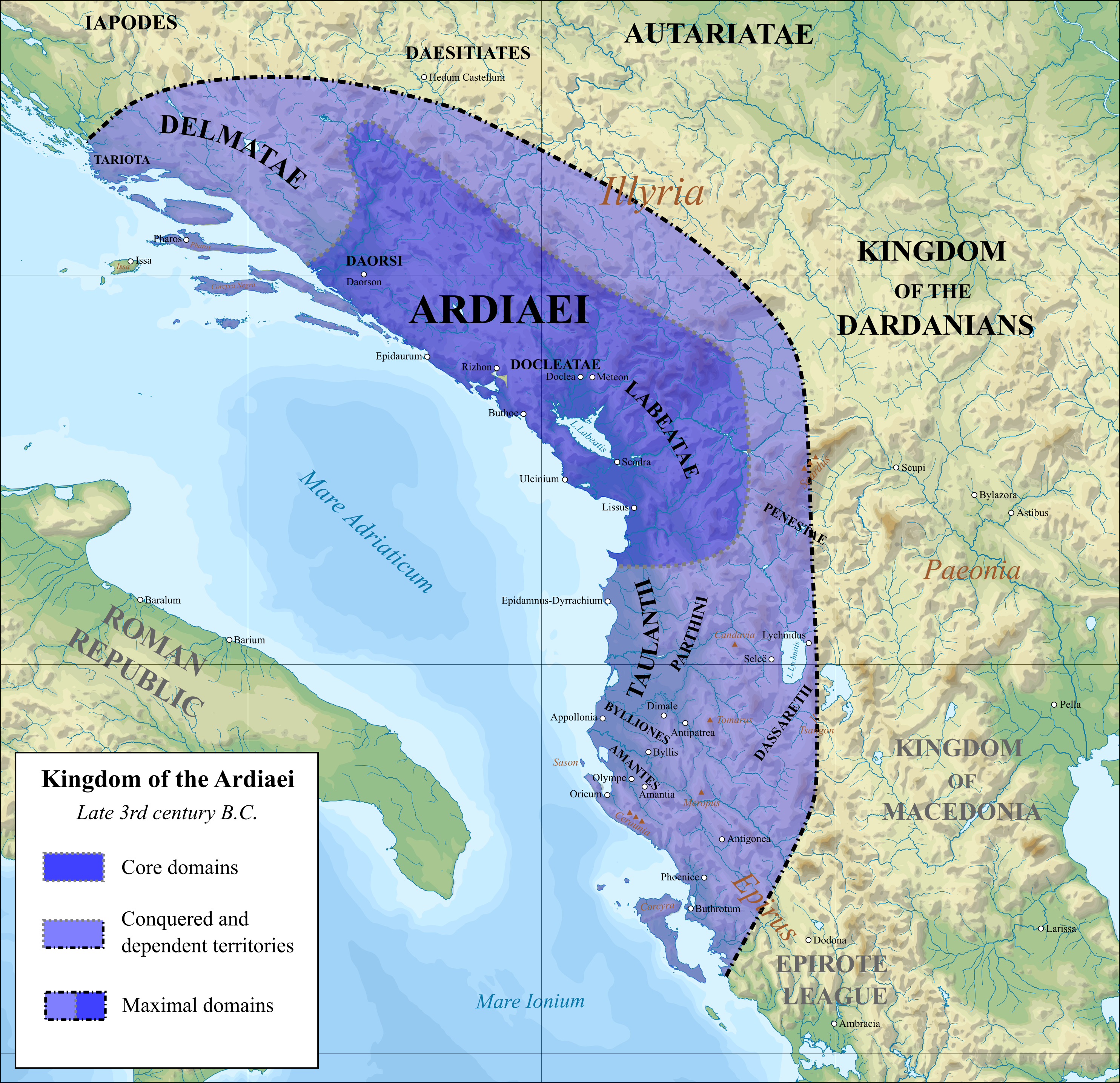
Kingdom of the Ardiaei in the late 3rd century BCE, prior to their war with Rome in 229 BCE.

Theopompus in the second book of his Philippics (History of Philip II of Macedon) write that Ardiaei had 300,000 slaves, who were called Prospelatae, and they were like the Helots.

== Ardiaean dynasty ==
The following list reports the members of the Ardiaean dynasty documented as such in ancient sources or coinage:

- Pleuratus (fl. c. 280 BC): father of Agron;
- Ballaios (fl. c. 260–230 BC): attested only from silver and bronze coinage, found abundantly along both coasts of the Adriatic;
- Agron (– 231 BC): son of Pleuratus; married Triteuta with whom he had Pinnes; he then divorced his first wife and married Teuta;
- Teuta (231 – 228): married Agron and was queen regent for Pinnes after Agron's death;
- Demetrius (fl. c. 228 – 219 BC): married Triteuta and was king regent for Pinnes after Teuta's abdication;
- Pinnes (220 – after 217): son of Agron and Triteuta.

The branch of Scerdilaidas, and his successors Pleuratus III and Gentius, is generally considered a Labeatan dynasty, that emerged after the fall of Agron and Teuta in the First Roman–Illyrian War. Indeed, the Illyrian king Gentius is also attested as reigning among the Labeatae. It is possible that the decline of the Ardiaean dynasty after Queen Teuta's defeat in the First Illyrian War against Rome caused the emergence of the Labeatan dynasty on the political scene.

== See also ==
- List of Illyrian peoples and tribes

== Sources ==
- Bearzot, Cinzia (2004). "Celti in Illiria. A proposito del frg. 40 di Teopompo". In Urso, Gianpaolo (ed.). Dall'Adriatico al Danubio: l'Illirico nell'età greca e romana : atti del convegno internazionale, Cividale del Friuli, 25-27 settembre 2003. I convegni della Fondazione Niccolò Canussio (in Italian). ETS. pp. 63–78. ISBN 884671069X.
- Dyczek, Piotr (2019). "Illyrian King Ballaios, King Agron and Queen Teuta from ancient Rhizon". ANODOS Studies of the Ancient World (13/2013). Trnavská univerzita v Trnave, Filozofcká fakulta: 195–202. ISSN 1338-5410.
- Dyczek, Piotr (2020). "Rhizon – capital of the Illyrian kingdom – some remarks". In Krzysztof Jakubiak; Adam Lajtar (eds.). Ex Oriente Lux. Studies in Honour of Jolanta Młynarczyk. Wydawnictwa Uniwersytetu Warszawskiego. pp. 423–433.
- Dzino, Danijel (2005). "Late Republican Illyrian Policy of Rome 167-60 BC: the Bifocal Approach". In C. Deroux (ed.). Studies in Latin Literature and Roman History. Vol. 12. Latomus. pp. 48–73. ISBN 9782870312285.
- Dzino, Danijel (2010). Illyricum in Roman Politics, 229 BC–AD 68. Cambridge University Press. ISBN 978-0-521-19419-8.
- Dzino, Danijel (2014). "'Illyrians' in ancient ethnographic discourse". Dialogues d'histoire ancienne. 40 (2): 45–65. doi:10.3917/dha.402.0045.
- Elsie, Robert (2015). "The Early History of Albania" (PDF). Keeping an Eye on the Albanians: Selected Writings in the Field of Albanian Studies. Vol. 16. ISBN 978-1-5141-5726-8.
- Ferone, Claudio (2004). "Appiano, "Illyr." 3 e la pirateria illirica nel IV sec.A.C." [Appian, "Illyr." 3 and the Illyrian piracy in the 4th century BC]. Hermes (in Italian). 132 (3). Franz Steiner Verlag: 326–337. JSTOR 4477612.
- Hammond, N. G. L. (1982). "Illyris, Epirus and Macedonia". In John Boardman; N. G. L. Hammond (eds.). The Cambridge Ancient History: The Expansion of the Greek World, Eighth to Sixth Centuries B.C. Vol. III (part 3) (2 ed.). Cambridge University Press. ISBN 0521234476.
- Hammond, N. G. L. (1994). "Illyrians and North-west Greeks". The Cambridge Ancient History Volume 6: The Fourth Century BC. Cambridge University Press: 422–443. doi:10.1017/CHOL9780521233484.017. ISBN 9780521233484.
- Jaupaj, Lavdosh (2019). Etudes des interactions culturelles en aire Illyro-épirote du VII au III siècle av. J.-C (Thesis). Université de Lyon; Instituti i Arkeologjisë (Albanie).
- Katičić, Radoslav (1976). Ancient Languages of the Balkans. Mouton. p. 158.
- Lippert, Andreas; Matzinger, Joachim (2021). Die Illyrer: Geschichte, Archäologie und Sprache. Kohlhammer Verlag. ISBN 9783170377103.
- Mesihović, Salmedin (2014). ΙΛΛΥΡΙΚΗ (Ilirike) (in Bosnian). Sarajevo: Filozofski fakultet u Sarajevu. ISBN 978-9958-0311-0-6.
- Mesihović, Salmedin; Šačić, Amra (2015). Historija Ilira [History of Illyrians] (in Bosnian). Sarajevo: Univerzitet u Sarajevu [University of Sarajevo]. ISBN 978-9958-600-65-4.
- Papazoglu, Fanula (1978). The Central Balkan Tribes in pre-Roman Times: Triballi, Autariatae, Dardanians, Scordisci and Moesians. Amsterdam: Hakkert. ISBN 9789025607937.
- Šašel Kos, Marjeta (2005). Appian and Illyricum. Narodni Muzej Slovenije. ISBN 978-961-6169-36-3.
- Severyn Bernolak; Vladoila Kolarić (1912). Iz povjesti Bosne i Hercegovine: Ardijejci. vlast. nakl.
- Šašel Kos, Marjeta (2007). "The Illyrian King Ballaeus – Some Historical Aspects". In Berranger, Danièle; Centre de recherches sur les civilisations antiques (eds.). Épire, Illyrie, Macédoine: Mélanges offerts au Professeur Pierre Cabanes. Presses Universitaire Blaise Pascal. ISBN 978-2-84516-351-5.
- Šašel Kos, Marjeta (2013). "The 'great lake' and the Autariatai in Pseudo-Skylax". Mélanges de l'École française de Rome: Antiquité. 125 (1): 247–257. doi:10.4000/mefra.1376.
- Shehi, Eduard (2023). "Archaic, Classical, and Roman Pottery". In Galaty, Michael L.; Bejko, Lorenc (eds.). Archaeological Investigations in a Northern Albanian Province: Results of the Projekti Arkeologjik i Shkodrës (PASH): Volume Two: Artifacts and Artifact Analysis. Memoirs Series. Vol. 64. University of Michigan Press. ISBN 9781951538699.
- Stipčević, Aleksandar (1974). The Illyrians: history and culture (1977 ed.). Noyes Press. ISBN 978-0815550525.
- Vickers, Miranda (1999). The Albanians: a modern history. New York: I. B. Tauris. ISBN 978-1-86064-541-9.
- Wilkes, John J. (1992). The Illyrians. Oxford, United Kingdom: Blackwell Publishing. ISBN 0-631-19807-5.
- Waterfield, Robin (2014). Taken at the Flood: The Roman Conquest of Greece. OUP Oxford. ISBN 978-0-19-166414-4.
