= Demotic =

Demotic may refer to:

- Demotic Greek, the modern vernacular form of the Greek language
- Demotic Egyptian script, an ancient Egyptian script
- Demotic Egyptian language, a stage in the development of the ancient Egyptian language
- Chữ Nôm, the demotic script for writing Vietnamese

== See also ==
- Demos (disambiguation)
- Domotics
- Territorial nationalism
