= Triteuta =

Illyrian queen

- Successor: Teuta
- Spouse: Agron (1st); Demetrius of Pharos (2nd)

Triteuta (Ancient Greek: Τριτεύτα; fl. 230–219 BC) was an Illyrian queen and the first wife of the Illyrian king Agron of the Ardiaei (r. 250–231 BC), with whom she had a son named Pinnes.

Sometime before his death (231/230 BC), Agron divorced Triteuta and married Teuta. Their son, crown prince Pinnes, was placed under the guardianship of step-mother Teuta (the Queen regent) until after the First Illyrian War (228 BC). It is believed that, at some point, Teuta abdicated, died, or was removed, and the regency for Pinnes was taken by Demetrius of Pharos.

According to Dio Chrysostom, Demetrius of Pharos married Triteuta and became regent for Pinnes, after the war, thus becoming the most powerful of the Illyrian rulers in the 220s BC.

== Sources ==
- A. E. Astin (7 December 1989). The Cambridge Ancient History. Cambridge University Press. pp. 91–. ISBN 978-0-521-23448-1.
- Dzino, Danijel (21 January 2010). Illyricum in Roman Politics, 229 BC–AD 68. Cambridge University Press. pp. 51–. ISBN 978-1-139-48423-7.
- Šašel Kos, Marjeta (2005). Appian and Illyricum. Narodni muzej Slovenije. ISBN 961616936X.
- Šašel Kos, Marjeta (2007). "The Illyrian King Ballaeus – Some Historical Aspects". In Berranger, Danièle; Centre de recherches sur les civilisations antiques (eds.). Épire, Illyrie, Macédoine: Mélanges offerts au Professeur Pierre Cabanes. Presses Universitaire Blaise Pascal. ISBN 978-2-84516-351-5.
