= Salmedin Mesihović =

Bosnian historian and archaeologist (born 1975)

Prof. Dr. Salmedin Mesihović
- Born: April 5, 1975 (age 51); Sarajevo, SR Bosnia and Herzegovina, SFR Yugoslavia
- Occupations: Associate professor, Assistant professor, Head of the Department of Archaeology
- Years active: 2000-2009; 1009-2012; 2009-2013; 2013-present
- Title: Associate professor

Academic background
- Education: University of Zagreb
- Thesis: Daesitiates: the cultural and ethno-political community in Illyricum and the conquest of the Octavian era (2007)

Academic work
- Era: Ancient history
- Discipline: Ancient history and archaeology
- Sub-discipline: Ancient Southeast Europe and Bosnia and Herzegovina, Illyricum and Illyrians under Romans
- Institutions: Faculty of Philosophy Department of History University of Sarajevo
- Main interests: Roman Republic and Great Illyrian revolt
- Notable works: Bitka za Ilirik- Battle for Illyricum

Salmedin Mesihović (born 5 April 1975) is a Bosnian professor of history and archaeology at the Faculty of Philosophy, Department of History, at University of Sarajevo, Bosnia and Herzegovina.

== Education ==
He is a trained historian and archaeologist. He studied history at the Department of History of the Faculty of Philosophy, at the University of Sarajevo and graduated in 1999. His postgraduate and magisterial came in 2004 at the Archaeology postgraduate studies of the Faculty of Philosophy, of the University of Zagreb, defending his master's thesis: Problem kulturne i etničke zajednice Autarijata (transl. Problem of the Cultural and Ethnic Community of Autariatae). At the same university, he defended his doctoral dissertation in 2007 entitled: Dezitijati: kulturna i narodnosno-politička zajednica u Iliriku i osvajanja Oktavijanova doba (transl. Daesitiates: the cultural and ethno-political community in Illyricum and the conquest of the Octavian era).

== Employment and works ==
He has been working at the Department of History of the Faculty of Philosophy in Sarajevo since 2000. He became assistant professor in 2009, and an associate professor of Ancient history from 2013. He participated in a number of scientific conferences.
He was the Head of the Department of Archaeology at the Faculty of Philosophy of the University of Sarajevo from 2009 to 2012.
As an author Mesihović has written a number of papers, published in various domestic and international scientific and professional journals and periodicals, such as Godišnjak Centra za balkanološka ispitivanja (transl. Yahrbuch/Yearbook of the Center for Balkan Studies - is the journal of the Centre for Balkan Studies of the Academy of Sciences and Arts of Bosnia and Herzegovina), Prilozi Instituta za istoriju (transl. Contributions of the Institute of History), Historijska traganja (transl. Historical Searches), Znakovi vremena (transl. Signs of Time), Bosna Franciscana (transl. Bosnia Franciscana).
He is a co-author of several textbooks, schoolbooks for primary and secondary education level schools.

== Bibliography ==
- „RES PVBLICAE SCRIBONIANI“, p.1-33, © 2010, UniBook, Self Publishing & Printing On Demand.
- „Progresivni komunizam“ © 2010, UniBook, Self Publishing & Printing On Demand.
- Rimski vuk i ilirska zmija. Posljednja borba, Filozofski fakultet Sarajevo, Elektronsko izdanje, Sarajevo, 2011
- Revolucije stare Helade i Rimske republike, Filozofski fakultet Sarajevo, Elektronsko izdanje, Sarajevo, 2011
- Antiqui homines Bosnae, Filozofski fakultet Sarajevo, Elektronsko izdanje, Sarajevo 2011

== Literature ==
- Monument 60th Anniversary of the Faculty of Philosophy in Sarajevo (1950-2010), Faculty of Philosophy, Sarajevo 2010, p. 140-141.
- Curriculum vitae, Salmedin Mesihovic
