= Pleuratus II =

Illyrian king of the Ardiaean Kingdom c.250 BC

- King

King of the Ardiaean
- Reign: c. 260 – c. 250 BC
- Successor: Agron of Illyria
- Ancient Greek: Πλευρᾶτος
- Dynasty: Ardiaean

Pleuratus II (Ancient Greek: Πλευρᾶτος; ruled c. 260 – c. 250 BC) was an Illyrian king of the Ardiaean Kingdom.

== Biography ==
Pleuratus was the founder of the Ardiaean Kingdom and the Ardiaean dynasty which controlled much of the Adriatic for the next one hundred years. Many historians believe that there was no interruption between the dynasty founded by Bardyllis and that of Pleuratus. Pleuratus's name is strikingly similar to that of Pleuratus I who in 344 BC clashed with Philip II. For this reason he may belong to the dynastic line of Glaucias. However Pleuratus was an Illyrian dynastic name borne by a number of Illyrian monarchs and nobles and nothing is known for sure. The most accepted theory is that Pleuratus did indeed create his own dynasty. Pleuratus was succeeded by his son Agron of Illyria in 250 BC.

By the coming of Pleuratus to the throne and particularly Agron, the most known events of Illyrian history begins.

== See also ==
- Illyrian warfare
- List of rulers of Illyria
