= Demetrius of Pharos =

Ruler of Pharos, king of part of Illyria

- King

King of Ardiaean
- Reign: c. 222 – 219 BC
- Predecessor: Teuta
- Successor: Scerdilaidas
- Died: 214 BC; Messene
- Consort: Triteuta
- Ancient Greek: Δημήτριος ἐκ Φάρου
- Dynasty: Ardiaean

Demetrius of Pharos (also Pharus; Ancient Greek: Δημήτριος ἐκ Φάρου and Δημήτριος ὁ Φάριος) was a ruler of Pharos involved in the First Illyrian War, after which he ruled a portion of the Illyrian Adriatic coast on behalf of the Romans, as a client king.

Demetrius was a regent ruler to Pinnes, the son of Agron who was too young to rule as king. When the Romans were occupied with their own problems, he had grown stronger as an ally of Macedonia and also by conquering Dimallum. Together with Scerdilaidas, he sailed south of Lissus and broke the Roman treaty, attacking Roman allies in the Adriatic and devastating and plundering many cities in the Cyclades and the Peloponnese. He was expelled from Illyria by Rome after the Second Illyrian War and became a trusted counselor at the court of Philip V of Macedon. He became a strong political influence to Philip V and encouraged him to clash with Rome. Demetrius remained there until his death at Messene in 214 BC while attempting to take the city.

== Early career ==
Mediterranean in 218 BC

Demetrius, described as Greek, half-Greek, or Illyrian, was from the Greek colony on the island of Pharos (modern Hvar, founded in 385 BC, in Croatia), in the Adriatic Sea off the coast of Dalmatia. Under the Illyrian king Agron, he ruled Pharos, from his stronghold (Stari Grad), overlooking a sheltered harbor. After Agron's death in 230 BC, Demetrius continued as ruler of Pharos under the regency of Queen Teuta, Agron's second wife and stepmother of Agron's son Pinnes, who was too young to rule.

== First Illyrian War ==
In 229 BC, continuing the expansion of Illyrian power that Agron had begun, Teuta systematically attacked Issa, the polis of Korkyra and Epidamnus. Lissus, Apollonia and Corcyra Nigra were all threatened. In a naval battle off the island of Paxos the Illyrian fleet, arguably commanded by Demetrius, defeated the allied Achaeans and Aetolians. As a result, the Korkyreans were forced to accept an Illyrian garrison in their city which was put under the command of Demetrius.

When the Romans were on their way to relieve Corcyra during the First Illyrian War, Demetrius felt that he was slandered by Teuta. Fearing her wrath, he betrayed her and gave up Corcyra to the Romans. Going over to the Roman side, he now acted as their guide for their campaign in Illyria. With Demetrius' help Rome achieved a quick victory, Teuta fled to Rhizon in Dalmatia (modern Risan, Montenegro), and Demetrius was placed in charge of most of the rest of Ardiaean Kingdom, as a client of Rome. Demetrius was rewarded with the rule of his birthplace, the island of Pharos, and a part of the land next to it, but this was only temporary. The Romans annexed the southern conquests of Teuta and following the war, due to one of the conditions imposed by Rome, Illyrian warships south of Lissus were expressly prohibited.

== Revival of power ==
The decade after 229 BC witnessed a revival of Illyrian power under Demetrius who succeeded Teuta. In or around 222 BC Demetrius became official regent of the Ardiaean Kingdom by marrying Triteuta, Agron's first wife and the mother of Pinnes. Personally beneficial for Demetrius, the marriage also gave the kingdom a competent regency for the first time since 229 BC. The king began to renew traditional Illyrian ties with Macedonia. In 222 BC an Illyrian corps of 1600 men under the command of Demetrius fought with distinction at the Battle of Sellasia, where the Macedonians won a conclusive victory over the Spartans. After Sellasia, Demetrius began attempting to extend his control over Illyria at the expense of Rome.

Before 222 BC Rome was preoccupied with a war against the Celtic peoples of the Po (225-222 BC), Demetrius detached the Illyrian Atintani from their Roman alliance. In addition, he sailed south of Lissus and engaged in piracy in contravention of the settlement in 228 BC. In 221 BC Demetrius also created an alliance with the Illyrian Histri at the head of the Adriatic, who were interfering with Roman supply ships. A Roman fleet soon attacked the Histri. Early in the summer of 221 BC, when tension was rising in Greece as Macedonia made an alliance with the Achaean League against the Aetolian League, the Illyrians attacked in their traditional manner.

In 220 BC Demetrius and the Illyrian commander, Scerdilaidas sailed south of Lissus with ninety lembi. After an assault on Pylos in the western Peloponnese had failed they separated their forces, with Demetrius taking his chances in plundering the Cyclades while Scerdilaidas returned north. On putting in at Naupactus with forty ships Scerdilaidas was encouraged by his brother-in-law Amynas, king of the Athamanes, to join the Aetolians in their planned invasion of Achaea. With help from Cynaethan traitors, they attacked, seized and burned Cynaetha, a town in the north of Arcadia, located on the northern slope of the Aroanian Mountains. They also attacked but failed to take Cleitor. Meanwhile, Demetrius continued on into the Aegean with 50 ships. He sailed to the Cyclades, where he extorted tribute from some of the islands and plundered the others. Chased by Rhodian warships, Demetrius put into Cenchreae, the Aegean port of Corinth. At the same time the Macedonian commander in Corinth, Taurion, learned of Scerdilaidas' and the Aetolians' invasion. Taking his cue from the Aetolians, Taurion agreed to drag Demetrius' ships across the Isthmus to bring them into play in the Gulf of Corinth, in return for Demetrius' assistance against the Aetolians. Although Demetrius conducted a few raids on the Aetolian coast, he was too late to hinder the Aetolians' return from Achaea.

After returning to the Ardiaean Kingdom, Demetrius continued operations during the following winter, attacking and seizing Roman allied cities and communities in southern Illyria. The Romans who hitherto ignored the activities of their former ally, decided that the harbors on the coast of the Ardiaean Kingdom had now to be made secure, in view of the threat of another war with Carthage. These events precipitated the Second Illyrian War.

== The Second Illyrian War ==
Unlike Teuta in 229 BC, Demetrius was well prepared for the Roman invasion. He first placed a garrison in Dimallum, an Illyrian city-fortress near Apollonia. He eliminated his opponents in other places, those Illyrians who opposed his rule, and stationed 6,000 of his best men on his home island Pharos. As before, both consuls of the year accompanied the Roman expedition, but the leading role was given to Aemilius Paullus, who was to be killed in the great Roman disaster at Cannae three years later. The Adriatic took on particular importance in Rome's preparations for the Second Punic War which was to last from 218 to 201 BC. Anticipating a long and difficult war far away from Rome, the Roman Senate decided first to set matters right in Illyria.

In 219 BC, having decided that Dimallum was crucial to Demetrius' power in the region, the consul prepared to besiege the city but was able to take it by direct assault within seven days. As a result, all the Illyrian towns and cities of the area submitted to Roman protection, each receiving the appropriate terms and conditions. Next, the Romans moved against Demetrius on the island of Pharos, who awaited the attack with good troops, ample provisions and war materials behind strong fortifications, that of the city of Issa (modern Vis). In order to avoid a long siege, Aemilius decided to risk another frontal attack. The Roman army moved from the mainland to a wooded area of the island. The next day, a small force of ships was sent out to tempt Demetrius from behind his fortifications. Demetrius marched down to the harbor to oppose the Roman landing. The strategy worked, and when the main Roman army appeared from another direction on the island, the Illyrian army was forced to give battle cut off from their city. Attacked on two sides, and cut off from the protection of the city walls, the battle was lost. In 218 BC, the Illyrian forces soon surrendered while Demetrius deserted the island and fled to Macedonia, making his way to the court of Philip V of Macedon, who was now the Macedonian king following the death of Antigonus.

=== Aftermath ===
The Romans destroyed the fortifications of Pharos and before the summer was over Aemilius was back in Rome receiving congratulations for a job well done. Any threat to the Roman holdings in Illyria had been eliminated, all the gains of the First Illyrian War had been secured, and the old restrictions of movement reimposed on the Illyrian kings. Demetrius may have returned to the Ardeaian State and have been attacked by another Roman force, although the regime of Pinnes, now confirmed as king, was left intact. Rome supported a small Ardeaian State ruled by Pinnes and his successors. The Roman republic called for the extradition of Demetrius, but Phillip refused. Pinnes was ordered to pay the arrears of tribute and reparations imposed after the war.

The weak Ardaeai State soon fell prey to Macedonia while the partial destruction brought onto the scene the urban koina of the Parthini, Byllines, Amanatini and others.

== Court counselor of Macedonia ==
Demetrius was received warmly by the young king whose father was also called Demetrius, becoming one of Philip's most trusted advisors. According to Polybius, Demetrius was instrumental in turning Philip's ambitions toward Illyria and Rome. In 217 BC when Philip learned of the victory of Hannibal, the Carthaginian general, over the Romans, at Lake Trasimene, Philip at first showed the letter only to Demetrius. Perhaps seeing a chance to recover his possessions in Illyria and exact a measure of revenge on Rome, Demetrius immediately advised the young king to make peace with the Aetolians, with whom Philip was at war, and turn his attentions westward. In summarising the strategy needed for the situation, Polybius states that Demetrius said:

For Greece is already entirely obedient to you, and will remain so: the Achaeans from genuine affection; the Aetolians from the terror which their disasters in the present war have inspired them. Italy, and your crossing into it, is the first step in the acquirement of universal empire, to which no one has a better claim than yourself. And now is the moment to act when the Romans have suffered a reverse.

Philip was easily convinced and followed Demetrius' advice. Evidence of Demetrius' influence can be seen in the treaty of alliance between Philip and Hannibal of 215 BC. One of its articles specified that any peace made with Rome would include as terms that the Romans would relinquish control of Corcyra, Apollonia, Epidamnus, Pharos, Dimale, Parthini, and Atintania and to restore to Demetrius of Pharos all those of his territories now in the dominion of Rome. In 217 BC Philip made war against Scerdilaidas, to recover some territory recently lost and to expand his control westward. Polybius gives as Philip's (and Demetrius') motives that:

… he thought it a matter of the most vital importance to bring Illyria into a state of good order, with a view to the success of all his projects, and above all of his passage into Italy. For Demetrius was so assiduous in keeping hot these hopes and projects in the king's mind, that Philip even dreamed of them in his sleep, and thought of nothing else but this Italian expedition. The motive of Demetrius in so acting was not a consideration for Philip, for he certainly did not rank higher than third in the calculations of Demetrius. A stronger motive than that was his hatred of Rome: but the strongest of all was the consideration of his own prospects. For he had made up his mind that it was only in this way that he could ever recover his principality in Pharos.

Such "dreams" eventually led to war with Rome, the First Macedonian War, and then the Second Macedonian War.

Polybius also blamed Demetrius' influence for Philip's tyrannical behavior. One incident involved Philip's apparent role in a massacre carried out by the people against their leaders that occurred at Messene in 215 BC. Arriving on the scene the day after the massacre and wanting to seize the acropolis, Philip asked his advisors whether the entrails of a sacrifice which had been made indicated that he should quit the citadel or hold it. Demetrius responded by saying: if you have the heart of an augur, quit it as quick as you can, but as a gallant and wise king, keep it, lest if you quit it now you may never have so good an opportunity again, for it is by thus holding the two horns that you can alone keep the ox under your control.

However, in this instance Philip took the more moderate advice of Aratus of Sicyon, who advised him to leave. Nevertheless, the incident at Messene marked, the beginning of Philip's deterioration of character, as well as his loss of popularity. Comparing Demetrius to Aratus, Polybius says that the life of Aratus sufficiently proved that he would not have committed such an act of wickedness, but that such principles exactly suited Demetrius of Pharos. The moderating influence of Aratus had caused the Greeks to regard Philip with favour, owing to the greatness of character which he displays, while under Demetrius' guidance, Philip lost the goodwill of the allies and his credit with the rest of Greece

Demetrius was killed the following year attempting to take Messene. After having rejected Demetrius' advice the previous year, Philip had returned in 214 BC, resolved to follow it.

== See also ==
- Illyrian warfare
- Illyrian Wars
- Macedonian Wars
- List of rulers of Illyria
- Scerdilaidas
- Philip V
