= Agron of Illyria =

Illyrian king

Agron
- King

King of Ardiaean
- Reign: 250–231 BC
- Predecessor: Pleuratus II
- Successor: Teuta (de facto), as regent of Pinnes (de jure)
- Died: 231 BC; Illyria
- Consort: Teuta, Triteuta
- Issue: Pinnes
- Dynasty: Ardiaei
- Father: Pleuratus II

Agron (/ˈæɡrən, ˈæɡˌrɒn/; Ancient Greek: Ἄγρων) was an Illyrian king of the Ardiaean Kingdom in the 3rd century BC, ruling c. 250–231 BC. The son of Pleuratus II, Agron succeeded in reconquering southern Illyria, which had been under the control of Epirus since the time of Pyrrhus, and in extending Illyrian rule over many cities in the Adriatic region, including Corcyra, Epidamnos, and Pharos.

He is most famed for his decisive victory over the Aetolian League, a state in western Greece. Around 231 BC, Agron suddenly died after his triumph over the Aetolians. Pinnes, his son with his first wife Triteuta, officially succeeded his father as king in 231 BC, but the kingdom was ruled by Agron's second wife, Queen Teuta.

== History ==
Agron was mentioned by two Greek historians, Appian (95–165 AD) in his Foreign Wars and Polybius (203–120 BC) in his Histories. Polybius wrote of him as "Agron, king of the Illyrians, was the son of Pleuratus, and possessed the most powerful force, both by land and sea, of any of the kings who had reigned in Illyria before him." The fact that he was mentioned as the son of another ruler indicates that Agron was a successor who managed to expand the power inherited from his ancestors.

Agron extended his rule over other neighboring tribes as well. He annexed part of Epirus, Epidamnus, and the islands of Korkyra (Corfu) and Pharos (Hvar), and garrisoned them. His state stretched from Narona in Dalmatia south to the river Aoos and Korkyra. During his reign, the Ardiaean state reached the height of its power. The Ardiaean army and fleet made it a major regional power in the Balkans and the southern Adriatic. Agron gained control of the Adriatic with his warships (lembi), a domination once enjoyed by the Liburnians. None of his neighbors were nearly as powerful. Agron gave the city of Pharos to Demetrius of Pharos to rule as its governor.

In 234 BC, the royal succession in Epirus came to an end, and a federal republic was instituted. In the south, the western part of Acarnania seceded from this arrangement. Their independence was soon threatened by the Aetolians, who began to occupy territory around the Gulf of Ambracia, including Pyrrhus' old capital, Ambracia, which forced the Epirotes to establish a new center at Phoenice. Besieged at Medion, the Acarnanians sought assistance from Demetrius II of Macedonia, who for the most of his reign had been at war with the Aetolian and Achaean Leagues. In response, the king brought Agron into the conflict. The Illyrian attack under Agron, mounted in either 232 or 231 BC, is described by Polybius:

One hundred lembi with 5000 men on board sailed up to land at Medion. Dropping anchor at daybreak, they disembarked speedily and in secret. They then formed up in the order that was usual in their own country, and advanced in their several companies against the Aetolian lines. The latter were overwhelmed with astonishment at the unexpected nature and boldness of the move; but they had long been inspired with overweening self-confidence, and having full reliance on their own forces were far from being dismayed. They drew up the greater part of their hoplites and cavalry in front of their own lines on the level ground, and with a portion of their cavalry and their light infantry they hastened to occupy some rising ground in front of their camp, which nature had made easily defensible. A single charge, however, of the Illyrians, whose numbers and close order gave them irresistible weight, served to dislodge the light-armed troops, and forced the cavalry who were on the ground with them to retire to the hoplites. But the Illyrians, being on higher ground, and charging down on from it upon the Aetolian trrops formed up on the plain, routed them without difficulty. The Medionians joined the action by sallying out of the town and charging the Aetolians, thus, after killing a great number, and taking a still greater number prisoners, and becoming masters also of their arms and baggage, the Illyrians, having carried out the orders of Agron, conveyed their baggage and the rest of their booty to their boats and immediately set sail for their own country.

The defeat of the Aetolians, famed for their victory over the invading Gauls a generation before, caused a sensation in Illyria. Agron was beside himself with delight when his ships returned and he learned of the victory from his commanders. Agron then drank so much by way of celebration, it was reported, that this and other similar indulgences, brought on an attack of pleurisy which killed him within a few days. Agron died in the winter of 231 BC.

The Greek cities (poleis) on the coast of Illyria were systematically attacked and perhaps already conquered by Agron's forces. Rome answered an appeal from the island of Vis (Issa), threatened by Agron, by sending envoys. They never got there. They were attacked en route by Illyrian vessels, and one of them was killed, together with an Issaean ambassador. Rome thereupon undertook military action against Agron's wife, Teuta, Agron having died in the interim. His son, Pinnes, succeeded him and ruled de jure (though never de facto) for thirteen years. Tritueta was Agron's first wife and the mother of Pinnes. Agron divorced her. Agron's second wife was Queen Teuta, who acted as regent after Agron's death.

== See also ==
- List of rulers of Illyria
- Agron (given name)

== Bibliography ==
- Astin, A. E. (1998). The Cambridge Ancient History: Rome and the Mediterranean to 133 B.C., Volume 8. Cambridge University Press. ISBN 0-521-23448-4.
- Berranger, Danièle; Cabanes, Pierre; Berranger-Auserve, Danièle (2007). Épire, Illyrie, Macédoine: Mélanges offerts au Professeur Pierre Cabanes. Presses Universitaire Blaise Pascal. ISBN 978-2-84516-351-5.
- Edwards, Iorwerth Eiddon Stephen; Gadd, C. J.; Hammond, Nicholas Geoffrey Lemprière; Seltman, Charles Theodore; Boardman, John; Bury, John Bagnell; Cook, Stanley Arthur; Adcock, Frank Ezra; Charlesworth, M. P.; Walbank, F. W.; Ling, Roger; Astin, A. E. (1977). The Cambridge Ancient History, Volume 7, Issue 1. Cambridge University Press. ISBN 0-521-23445-X.
- Hammond, Nicholas Geoffrey Lemprière; Walbank, F. W. (1988). A History of Macedonia: Volume III: 336-167 B.C. Oxford University Press, USA. ISBN 0-19-814815-1.
- Hammond, Nicholas Geoffrey Lemprière (1967). Epirus: The Geography, the Ancient Remains, the History and Topography of Epirus and Adjacent Areas. Clarendon Press.
- Hammond, Nicholas Geoffrey Lemprière (1993). Studies concerning Epirus and Macedonia before Alexander. Hakkert. ISBN 9789025610500.
- Mesihović, Salmedin; Šačić, Amra (2015). Historija Ilira [History of Illyrians] (in Bosnian). Sarajevo: Univerzitet u Sarajevu [University of Sarajevo]. ISBN 978-9958-600-65-4.
- Šašel Kos, Marjeta (2014). "Agron, Illyrian". The Encyclopedia of Ancient History. Wiley-Blackwell. doi:10.1002/9781444338386.wbeah09015. ISBN 978-1-4443-3838-6.
- Wilkes, John (1969). Dalmatia. Routledge & K. Paul. ISBN 9780710062857.
- Wilkes, John (1995). The Illyrians. Wiley-Blackwell. ISBN 0-631-19807-5.

Agron of Illyria Ardiaean kingdom Born: Unknown Died: 231 BC
| Preceded by Pleuratus II | King of the Ardiaei; 250–231 BC | Succeeded by Pinnes, though regent Teuta ruled |
