= Pinnes (Ardiaean) =

King of Ardieai

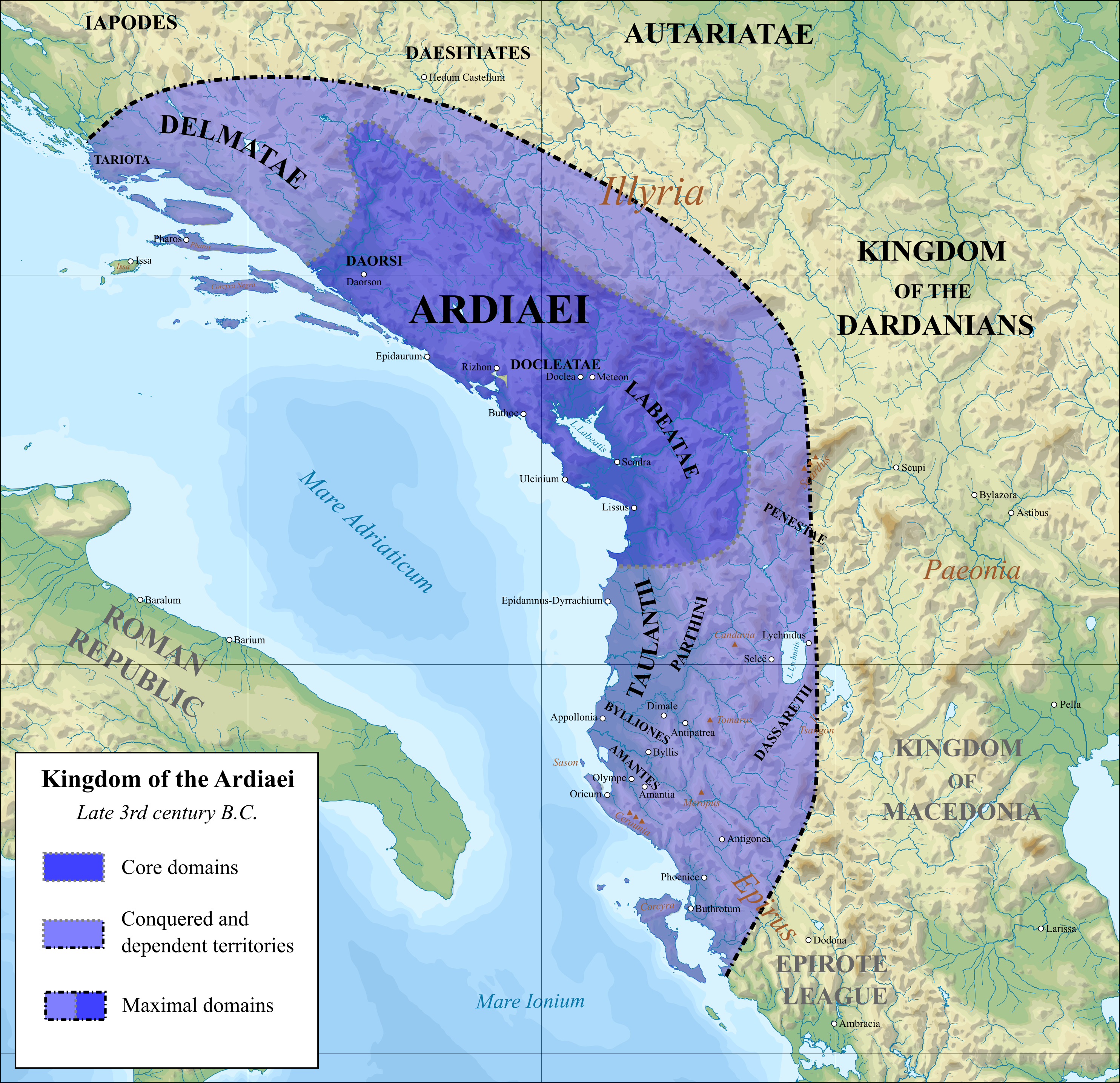
Kingdom of Teuta of the Ardiaei (230s–228 BC), regent to Pinnes

Pinnes (Ancient Greek: Πίννης; also Pinnius; c. 230 – 217 BC) was the son of Agron, king of the Ardiaei in Illyria, and Agron's first wife Triteuta. He officially succeeded his father as king in 230 BC, but the Ardiaean kingdom was ruled by Agron's second wife, Queen Teuta.

== Biography ==
Pinnes was only a young boy when his father died in 230 BC, and his stepmother Teuta assumed de facto control. Local chiefs demanded greater power and autonomy for their regions and Teuta, who feared losing her status, appeased the aggressors. This act was seen as a sign of weakness and no ship in the Adriatic and Ionian sea was safe from Illyrian pirates who raided regardless of a ship's country or the damage it would do to Illyria's foreign relations.

Greece was the most affected by this new danger as their economy depended on the seas. Rome, wanting to protect trade routes between Magna Graecia and Greece, sent delegates to mediate the situation, but war broke out due to a disagreement between Teuta and Rome's ambassadors. She ordered the assassinations of the delegates and sparked the First Illyrian War in 229 BC. Teuta surrendered and accepted Rome's peace terms which included her abdication and the reinstatement of Pinnes.

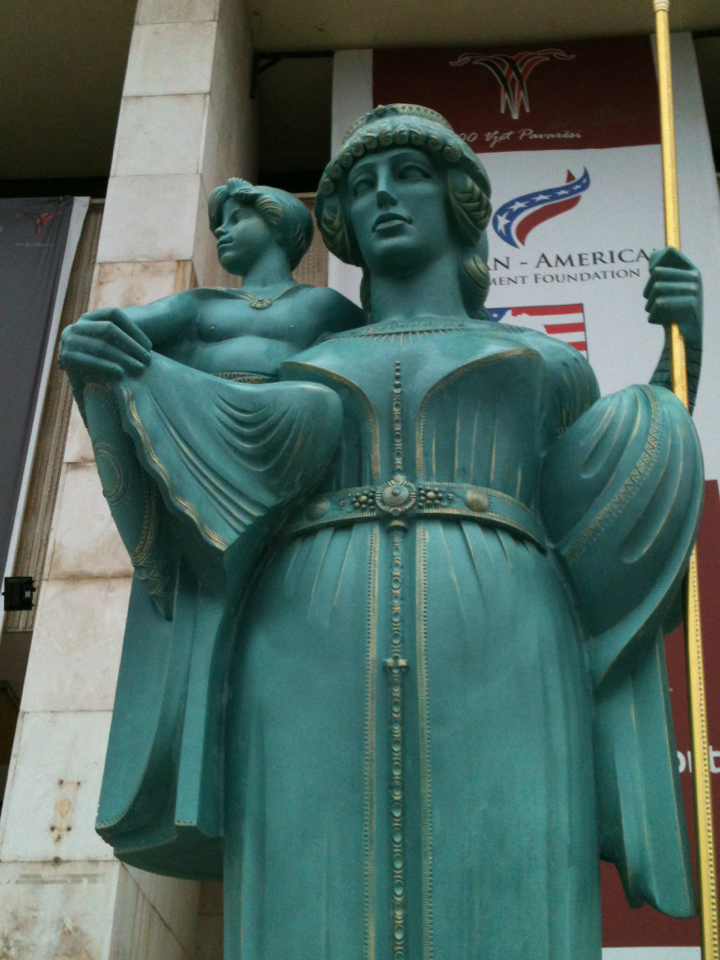
Modern statue in Tirana of Pinnes in the arms of his stepmother Teuta

Pinnes once again lost his throne when Demetrius of Pharos (Pharos is today the island of Hvar) married Triteuta and declared himself king. Demetrius ignored the treaty with Rome and allied Illyria with Rome's long term enemy Macedon. The Second Roman-Illyrian War began in 219 BC when a Roman army was sent to Illyria. Demetrius fled to Macedon and Pinnes finally became king, though his sudden death in 217 BC at the age of about 15 meant that he never actually ruled.

Pinnes is not even mentioned by Polybius, though Appian and Cassius Dio refer to him as the legitimate heir. Appian writes that Pinnes asked for the aid of the Romans but nothing seems to have come of it.

== See also ==
- List of rulers of Illyria

Pinnes (Ardiaean) Ardiaean kingdom Born: 230 Died: 217
Preceded by Agron	King of the Ardieai; Teuta ruled in his place	Succeeded by Gentius
