= Teuta =

Queen regent of the Ardiaei

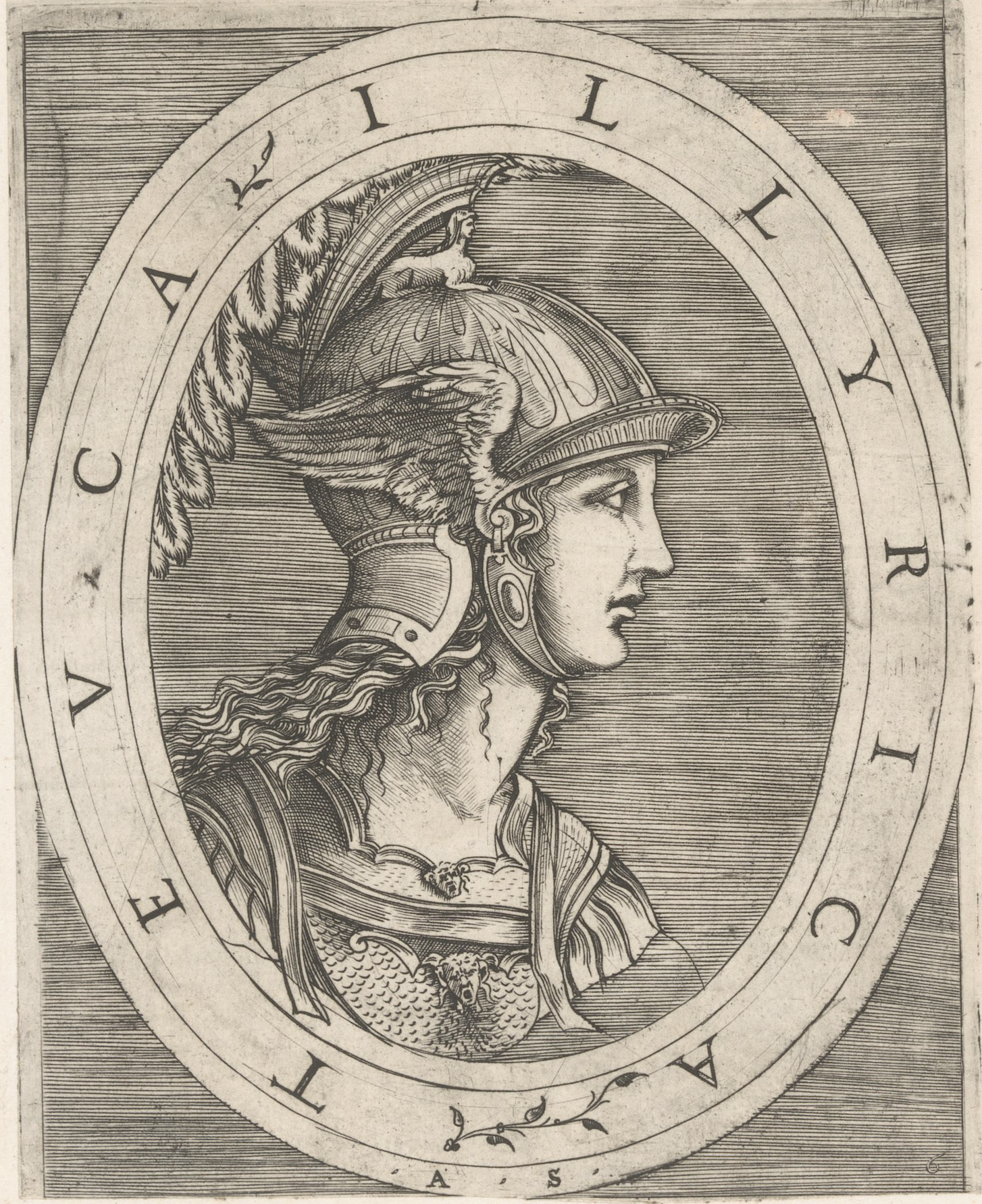
- TEV[U]C[T]A ILLYRICA on a 16th-century Italian engraving

Queen regent of the Ardiaei
- Regency: 231–228/227 BC
- Predecessor: Agron of Illyria
- Successor: Demetrius of Pharos
- Monarch: Pinnes
- Spouse: Agron
- House: Ardiaei
- Dynasty: Ardiaean

Teuta (Illyrian: *Teutana, 'mistress of the people, queen'; Ancient Greek: Τεύτα; Latin: Teuta) was the queen regent of the Ardiaei tribe in Illyria, who reigned approximately from 231 BC to 228/227 BC.

Following the death of her spouse Agron in 231 BC, she assumed the regency of the Ardiaean Kingdom for her stepson Pinnes, continuing Agron's policy of expansion in the Adriatic Sea, in the context of an ongoing conflict with the Roman Republic regarding the effects of Illyrian piracy on regional trade.

The death of one of the Roman ambassadors at the hands of Illyrian pirates gave Rome the occasion to declare war against her in 229 BC. She surrendered after losing the First Illyrian War in 228. Teuta had to relinquish the southern parts of her territory and pay a tribute to Rome, but was eventually allowed to keep a realm confined to an area north of Lissus, modern day Lezhë, Albania.

Biographical details on the life of Teuta are biased by the fact that the surviving ancient sources, which were written by Greek and Roman authors, were generally hostile to Illyrians and to their queen.

== Name ==
Her name is known in Ancient Greek as Τεύτα (Teúta) and in Latin as Teuta, both used as a diminutive form of the Illyrian name *Teuta(na) ('queen'; literally 'mistress of the people'). It descends from the Proto-Indo-European (PIE) stem *teutéh₁- ('the people', perhaps 'the people under arms'), attached to the PIE suffix *-nā ('mistress of'; masc. *-nos).

The Illyrian name *Teuta(na) is an exact cognate of the Gothic masculine form 𐌸𐌹𐌿𐌳𐌰𐌽𐍃 (þiudans 'king'), itself derived from an earlier *teuto-nos ('master of the people').

== Biography ==
=== Background ===
After the death of her husband Agron (250–231 BC), the former king of the Ardiaei, she inherited his kingdom and acted as regent for her young stepson Pinnes. The exact extent of the kingdom of Agron and Teuta remains uncertain. From what we know, it stretched on the Adriatic coast-land from central Albania up to the Neretva river, and they must have controlled most of the Illyrian inland. According to Polybius, Teuta soon addressed the neighbouring states malevolently, ordering her commanders to treat all of them as enemies and supporting the piratical raids of her subjects, which eventually brought Roman forces to cross the Adriatic for the first time, since those activities increasingly interfered with their trade route in the Adriatic and the Ionian Sea.

=== Early reign (231–230 BC) ===
In 231 BC, Teuta's armies attacked the regions of Elis and Messenia in the Peloponnese. On their way home, they captured the Epirote city of Phoenice, at that time the most prosperous place of Epirus and a centre for the growing commerce with the Italian Peninsula. The city was soon liberated and a truce accepted against the payment of a fee and freeborn prisoners. The seizure of an urban centre, as opposed to looting in the countryside, represented an escalation in the threat posed by Illyrians to Greeks and Romans alike. During their occupation of Phoenice, some Illyrian pirates looted Italian merchant ships in such a high number that the Roman Senate, after ignoring earlier complaints, was compelled to dispatch ambassadors to the city of Scodra in order to solicit reparations and demand an end to all pirate expeditions. The vivid account of the event, given by the Greek historian Polybius and overtly hostile to Teuta, was probably influenced by an earlier Roman tradition originally intended to justify the invasion of Illyria.

On their arrival, the Roman ambassadors found Queen Teuta celebrating the end of an internal Illyrian rebellion as her armies were about to lay siege to the Greek island city of Issa. She promised that no royal force would hurt them, but that piracy was a traditional Illyrian custom she was unable to put an end to. Teuta also implied that "it was contrary to the custom of the Illyrian kings to hinder their subjects from winning booty from the sea". One of the envoys reportedly lost his temper and replied that Rome would make it her business to "improve relations between sovereign and subject in lllyria", since "[they had] an admirable custom, which is to punish publicly the doers of private wrongs and publicly come to the help of the wronged."

The ambassador expressed himself to the queen so disrespectfully that her attendants were ordered to seize their ship as it embarked back for Rome, and the insolent envoy was murdered on his homeward voyage, allegedly on Teuta's order. In Polybius's account, the Roman ambassadors are named Gaius and Lucius Coruncanius. Cassius Dio's account suggests that they were more than two ambassadors, and that some of them were murdered while others were made prisoners. In Appian's version, the two ambassadors, one Roman (Coruncanius) and one Issaian (Kleemporos), were captured and murdered by some Illyrian lemboi before they landed on Illyrian land while Agron was still alive, implying that the interview between Teuta and the ambassadors may not have occurred. In any case, news of the murder caused the Romans to prepare for war: legions were enlisted and the fleet assembled.

=== War with Rome (229–228 BC) ===
In 229 BC, Rome declared war on Illyria and, for the first time, the Roman armies crossed the Adriatic Sea to set foot in the western Balkans. An army consisting of approximately 20,000 troops, 200 cavalry units and an entire Roman fleet of 200 ships, led by Gnaeus Fulvius Centumalus and Lucius Postumius Albinus, was sent to conquer Illyria.

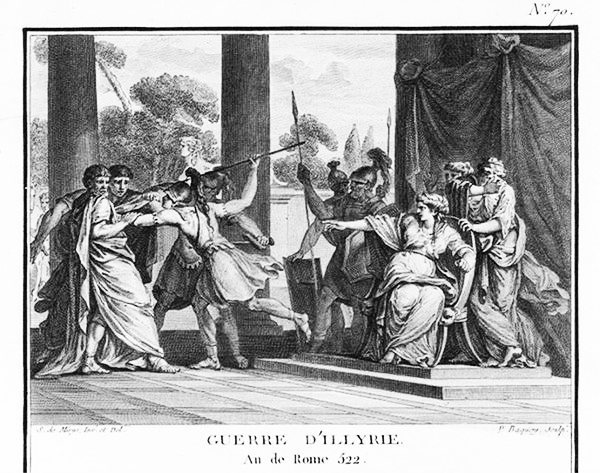
Teuta orders her guards to murder the Roman envoys – Augustyn Mirys

The Roman attack seems to have caught Teuta by surprise, since she had ordered a large naval expedition involving most of her ships against the Greek colony of Corcyra in the winter of 229. When the 200 Roman ships arrived at Corcyra, Teuta's governor Demetrius betrayed her and surrendered the city to the Romans, before turning into their advisor for the remaining time of the war. At the end of the conflict in 228 BC, the Romans awarded him the position of governor of Pharos and the adjacent coasts. In the meantime, the remainder of the Roman army landed further north at Apollonia. The combined army and navy proceeded northward together. After subduing one town after another, they eventually besieged the capital, Scodra. Teuta herself had retreated with a few followers to the fortified and strategically well-placed city of Rhizon, the principal base of the Illyrian fleet.

According to Polybius, she made a treaty in the early spring of 228 BC by which she consented to pay an annual tribute, to reign over a restricted and narrow region north of Lissus (modern Lezhë), and not to sail beyond Lissus with more than two unarmed ships. He also reports that they required her to acknowledge the final authority of Rome. According to Cassius Dio, she abdicated later in 227 BC.

=== Later life ===
Appian mentions that, after the defeat, Teuta sent an embassy to Rome to deliver captives and to apologize for the events that had occurred during her spouse Agron's reign, but not under hers.

== Ancient depictions ==
=== Reliability of accounts ===
The most detailed account of Teuta's short reign is that of Polybius (c. 200–118 BC), supplemented by Appian (2nd c. AD) and Cassius Dio (c. AD 155–235). According to scholar Marjeta Šašel Kos, the most objective portrait of Teuta is that of Appian. Historian Peter Derow also argues that Appian's version, especially the story of the murder of the ambassadors, is more plausible than that of Polybius.

Polybius's narrative, written almost one century after the events and generally hostile to Illyrians and their queen alike, was probably inherited from an earlier account written by the Roman chronicler Quintus Fabius Pictor (fl. 200 BC), a contemporary of Teuta who was strongly biased towards his own nation. But if Polybius was ready to accept the negative picture of the existing tradition, as it confirmed his own negative views on women, he was also aware of Fabius's own prejudices and opposed them on some occasions.

== Legacy ==
According to a legend with its roots in the town of Risan, Teuta ended her life in grief by throwing herself from Orjen mountains at Lipci.

Teuta is a common given name among Albanian women. The Albanian sporting club Teuta Durrës was named after her in 1930.

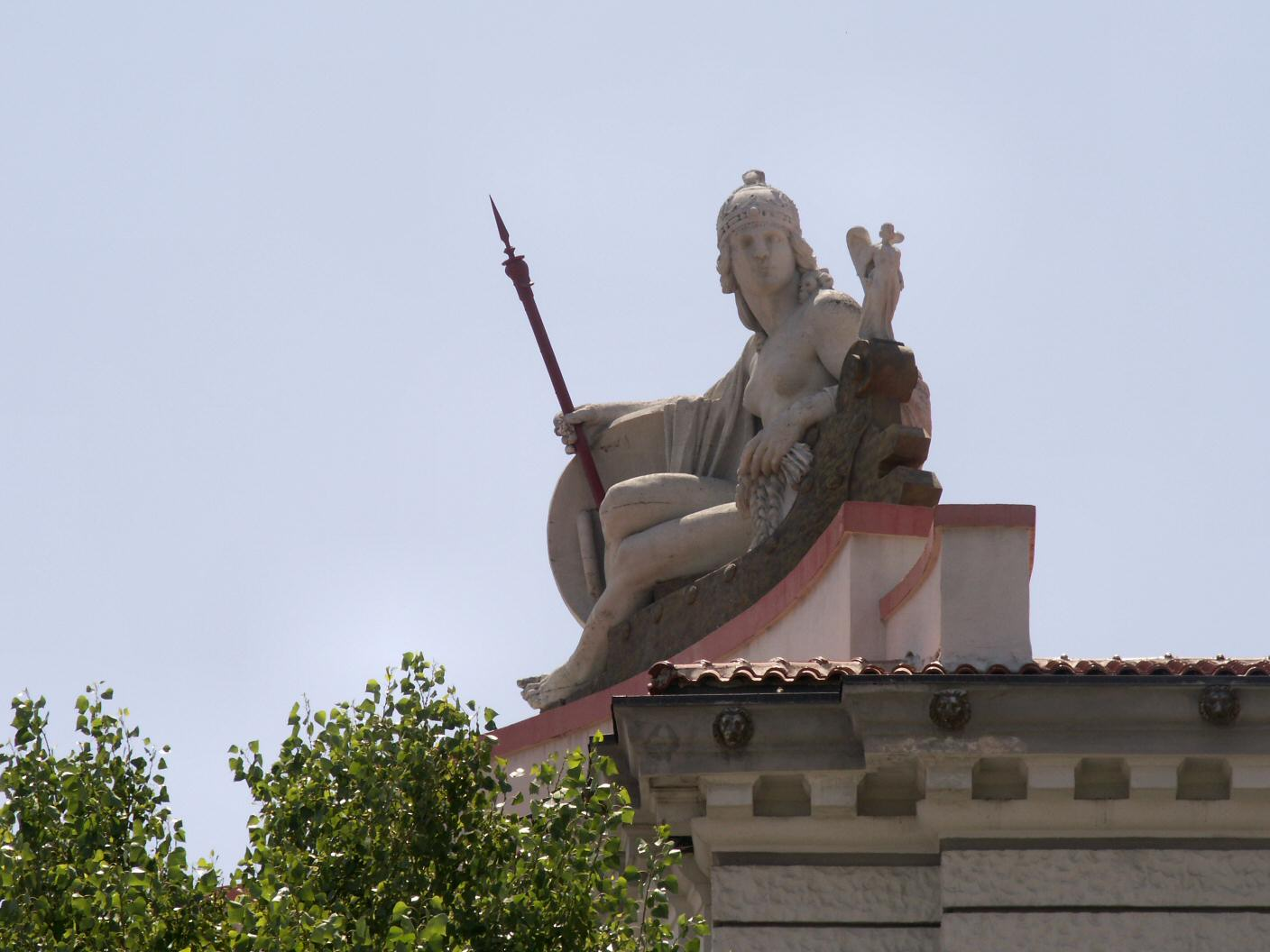
20th-century statue of Teuta on a public building in Durrës.

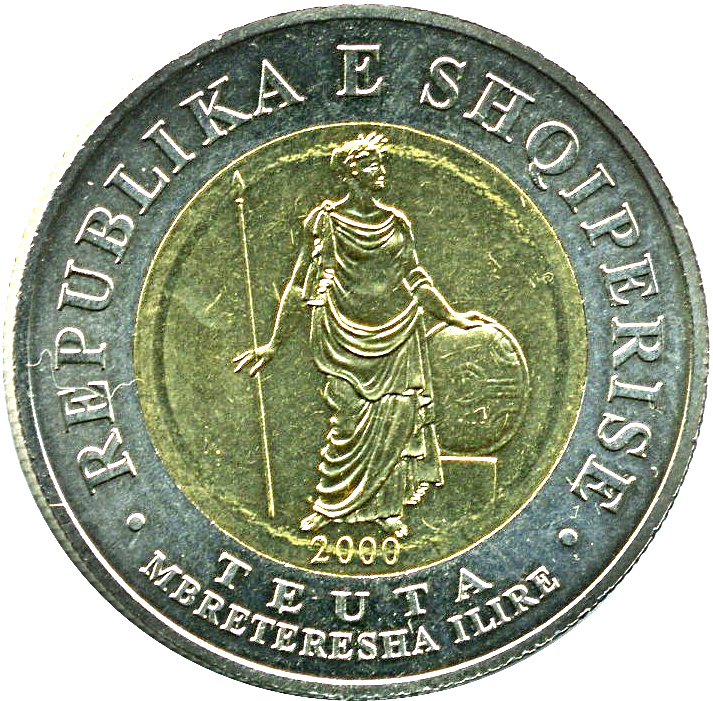
Teuta on the reverse of an Albanian coin (100 Lek).

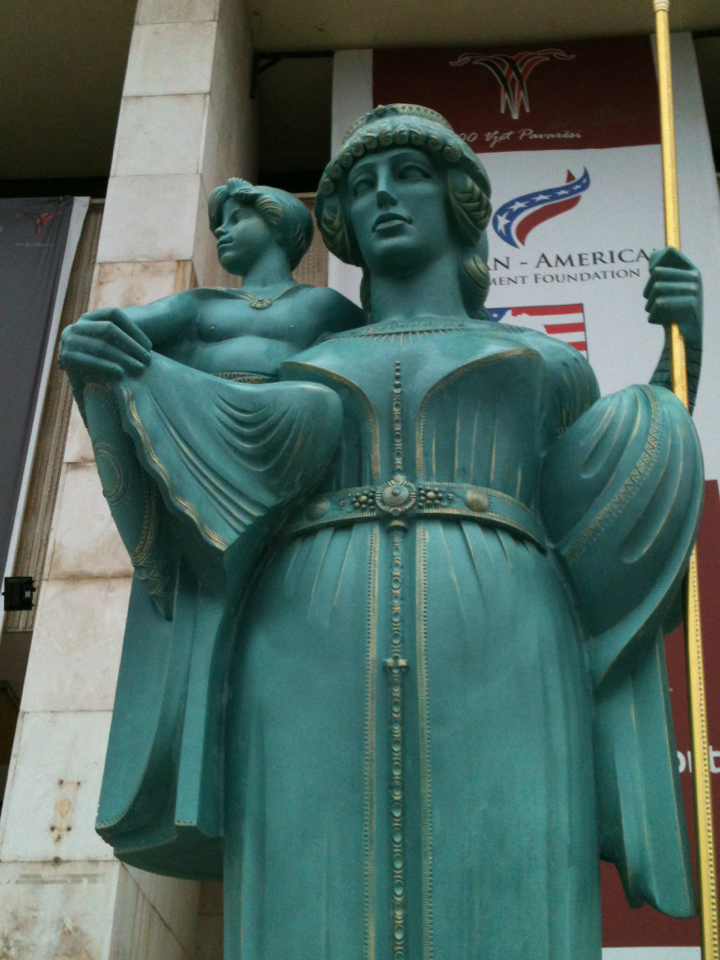
Modern statue of Teuta with her stepson Pinnes in Tirana, Albania.

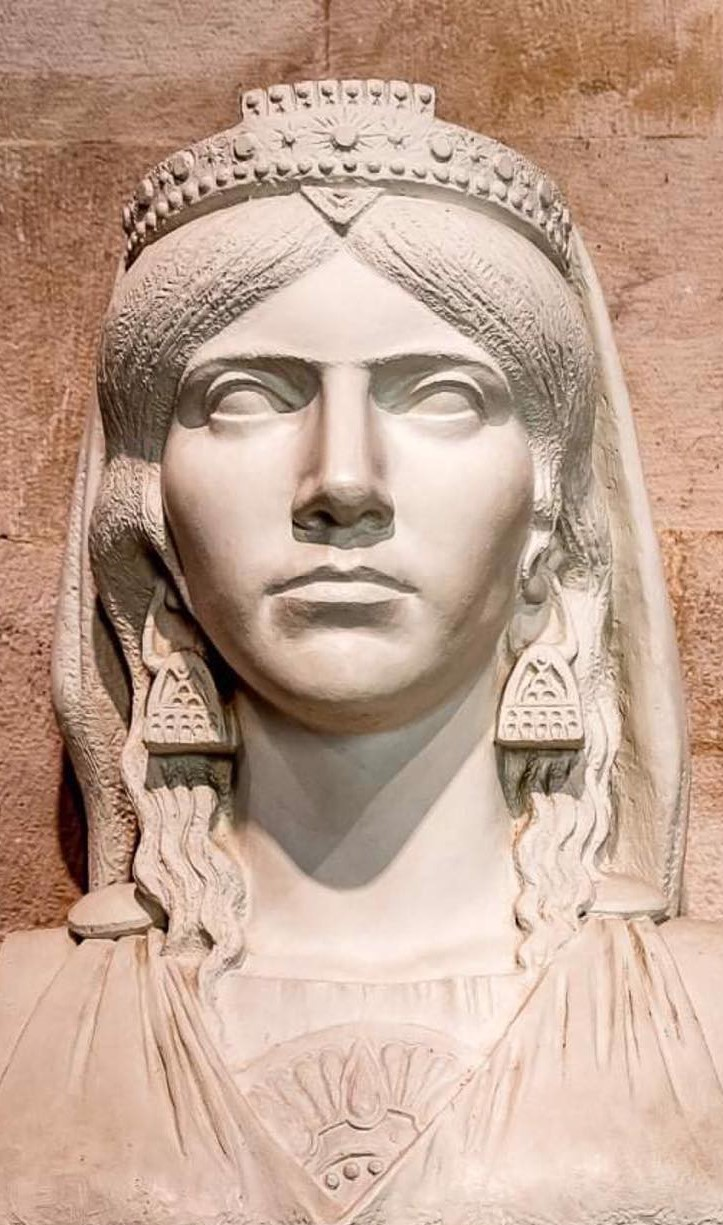
Modern bust of Teuta from the Skanderbeg Museum in Krujë.

== See also ==
- Illyrian warfare
- List of rulers of Illyria
- Teuta – Female given name

Teuta Illyrian kingdom Born: Unknown Died: Unknown
Preceded by Agron	Queen of the Ardiaei (regent to Pinnes); 231–227 BC	Succeeded by Gentius
