= Siege of Issa =

229 BCE siege

- Part of Illyrian Wars
Date	230 BC – 229 BC (Note: Appian's version of events is different from that of Polybius. His report is vaguer than that of Polybius and was written four centuries later, and so seems less reliable. He states that the siege begun in 229 BC and ended with Roman intervention in 228 BC, whilst Polybius states that the siege took place between 230 BC and 229 BC.)
Location	Issa (modern day Vis, Croatia)
Result	Illyrian defeat; Romans lift the siege

Belligerents
Issa; Roman Republic (229 BC)	Ardiaean Kingdom of Illyria

Commanders and leaders
Gnaeus Fulvius (229 BC); Aulus Postumius (229 BC)	Queen Teuta (Note: Appian states that Agron begun the siege in 229 BC and then died in 228 BC, leaving Teuta to continue the siege in 228 BC until her surrender. On the other hand, Polybius states that Agron had died in 231 BC after his victory at Medion, before the siege had begun, and the siege was in full carried out by Teuta between 230 BC and 229 BC.); Demetrius of Pharos (230 BC)

Strength
200 ships under Fulvius; 20,000 infantry and 200 cavalry under Postumius	Unknown

The siege of Issa took place from 230 BC to 229 BC between the forces of the Ancient Greek colony of Issa, aided by the Roman Republic, and the Ardiaean Kingdom of Illyria.

== Prelude ==
Earlier in 230 BC, Illyrian forces under Queen Teuta (Note: Appian states that Agron had invaded Epirus, not Teuta (which in his version only took power in 228 BC) whilst Polybius claims that Agron died after his victory at Medion in 231 BC and that Teuta ordered the invasion of Epirus the following year.) and Scerdilaidas had invaded Epirus through both land and by sea, capturing Phoenice and much of Epirus, passing Antigoneia and nearing Helicranum (modern Ioannina). Despite an Illyrian victory at the Battle of Phoenice, a pro-Dardanian rebellion in the north-east of the Kingdom forced Teuta to call back Illyrian forces from Epirus. Teuta quickly crushed the rebellion, and now turned towards Issa, situated off the coastline of Illyria.

== Siege ==
Shortly after defeating the rebels, Illyrians under Teuta and Demetrius, commander of neighbouring Pharos island, begun to siege Issa. Soon after the siege begun, Rome sent ambassadors to meet Teuta at Issa. Teuta ordered the killing of one of the ambassadors who had offended her. Following this, Rome declared war, starting the First Illyrian War in 230 BC, and invaded Illyrian occupied Corcyra. The commander of the Illyrian garrison in Corcyra was Demetrius, who surrendered his forces, along with control of Corcyra and Pharos, to the Romans and betrayed Teuta. The Romans then landed at southern Illyria with the guidance of Demetrius, and after much success, they sailed north to relieve the siege of Issa in 229 BC. The Romans defeated the Illyrian besiegers and relieved the Issaeans, with the island coming under Roman protection. The Illyrian besiegers acting under Demetrius were spared by the Romans, whilst those under Teuta retreated to Arbo.

== Cause of the war ==
Polybius says that the Romans had sent ambassadors to Illyria due to the killings of Romans and numerous attacks on Roman vessels by the Illyrians. Appian, on the other hand, says that Romans intervened after Issa requested Roman support. A later historian, Gruen, states that Appian (who reported the siege almost four centuries after Polybius) and later historians misinterpreted Roman intervention, saying it was just a coincidence that the Illyrians were besieging Issa, and that Roman intervention just to liberate Issa was an inadequate excuse for war (though it is possible that Issa did indeed request Roman assistance). As well as this, after the Romans begun the First Illyrian War in 230 BC, they first captured many other territories, leaving Issa to be besieged for over a year, before finally liberating the island towards the end of the campaign.
