= Scerdilaidas =

Illyrian ruler

- Reign: 218–206 BC
- Predecessor: Demetrius of Pharos
- Successor: Pleuratus III
- Died: 206 BC
- Consort: Sister of Amynas
- Father: Pleuratus II

Scerdilaidas or Skerdilaid (Ancient Greek: Σκερδιλαΐδας; ruled 218–206 BC) was an Illyrian ruler of the Illyrian kingdom under the Labeatan dynasty. Before taking the throne, Scerdilaidas was commander of the Illyrian armies and played a major role in the Illyrian Wars against the Romans.

Scerdilaidas was one of the youngest brothers of Agron and father of Pleuratus III and grandfather of Gentius. Scerdilaidas took part in many expeditions in the Ionian and Aegean with Demetrius and his brother-in-law Amynas of Athamania. During his early reign Scerdilaidas was an ally of Rome. In 217 BC Scerdilaidas later adopted Roman rule and became an enemy of Macedonia for parleying with Rome. With the Romans invested by Hannibal, Philip V of Macedon sought to take southern Illyria from Scerdilaidas and made several advancements into the Ardiaean State from 214 BC to 210 BC.

In reaction, the Aetolian League and the Dardanians under Longarus joined with Scerdilaidas to defeat the Macedonians in 208 BC. With no chance of victory, Philip V accepted peace in 205 BC. Unlike most other Illyrian kings of which there is only sparse data, Scerdilaidas is mentioned in the writings of the historian Appian, Livy and Polybius, and in their chronicles of the Roman and Greek wars.

== Commander ==
=== Under Queen Teuta ===
The Adriatic coast during the reign of Scerdilaidas.

Long before he became king, Scerdilaidas was a leader who helped determine Illyrian policy. He was the commander of the Illyrian army during the reign of his brother, Agron. Scerdilaidas also served under Teuta and even Demetrius of Pharos. He was one of the leading supporters of Queen Teuta when she took on the regency of Pinnes. He played a determining role in the plans of Teuta to create an Adriatic front against Rome.

Under the reign of Teuta, Scerdilaidas was the commander of a large land force of 5,000 during the Invasion of Epirus in 230 BC. Scerdilaidas marched south through the pass at Antigoneia to assist Teuta's forces at the Epirote capital of Phoenice. News that Scerdilaidas was on his way caused the Epirotes to send part of their forces north to secure the city. After the Illyrian victory at the Battle of Phoenice, Epirus begged for assistance from the Greek Leagues, while Teuta's army, having joined up with the forces led by Scerdilaidas, marched inland to Halicranum deep in the heart of Epirus, on the plain of modern Ioannina.

Scerdilaidas chose a good position and prepared the army for battle against the Leagues the next day which he believed he would win. Orders to withdraw arrived from Teuta because some of the revolting Illyrians within the Ardiaean State had joined the influential Dardanian State under Longarus who wanted to invade the northern regions of Teuta's state. Scerdilaidas was forced to return and secure the Ardiaean State's northern borders from Longarus. As Scerdilaidas marched north, Teuta secured a peace treaty in favour of the Ardiaean State. While still in Epirus Scerdilaidas led a fleet of lembi on the Ionian Sea and swept through Corfu and Onchesmos and intercepted and plundered some merchant vessels of Rome.

After the defeat of Teuta during the First Illyrian War in 228 BC, young Pinnes, formally King of Illyria under Teuta's regency, was confirmed to remain king of a limited Ardiaean State by the victorious Romans. Soon the regency was taken over by Demetrius of Pharos, who married Pinnes' mother, Triteuta, the divorced wife of Scerdilaidas' brother Agron. This happened most probably without consent of Rome, even if Demetrius was their ally.

=== Under Demetrius ===
In 220 BC Demetrius and Scerdilaidas made a joint expedition down the Ionian coast to the Peloponnese with 90 lembi, and thus Demetrius violated the treaty with Rome by sailing south of the coastal city of Lissus. After an assault on Pylos in the western Peloponnese was successful, they divided their force. Demetrius with fifty ships sailed on a raiding expedition in the Aegean against the Cyclades, while Scerdilaidas with the remaining forty ships agreed to support the Aetolians in an invasion of the Achaean League. On putting in at Naupactus, Scerdilaidas was encouraged by his brother-in-law Amynas, king of the Athamanes, to join them in the planned invasion of Achaea. Scerdilaidas and his allies also attacked but failed to take Cleitor. While Scerdilaidas collaborated with the Aetolians, Demetrius was persuaded to assist the Macedonian cause against Aetolia on his return via the Isthmus of Corinth. Demetrius returned to the Ardiaean State and began to revive Illyrian power. However, he was beaten by the Romans in 219 BC during the Second Illyrian War.

== Relations with Macedon ==
After the Second Illyrian War, Pinnes was again proclaimed king. Pinnes was not favoured among the Illyrians and in 218 BC Scerdilaidas took over his nephew's role and became king. Under pressure from the Carthaginians in Spain, the Romans did not intervene. In 220 BC Scerdilaidas entered into an alliance with Philip V of Macedon. Scerdilaidas had aided Philip during the Social War against the Spartans but this produced little profit for him. Scerdilaidas' support for Macedon against the Aetolians was curtailed by 'plots and conflicts' caused by rulers of various cities.

In 217 BC, Scerdilaidas ceased his support for Philip V, maintaining that a promised subsidy was unpaid and long overdue. He dispatched 15 ships, ostensibly to collect and escort the payment, but at the island of Leucas south of Corcyra his forces killed two of Philip's Corinthian allies and seized their four ships. Scerdilaidas' fleet then sailed south and began to plunder shipping around Cape Malea in the southern Peloponnese. In response, Philip prepared a strong naval force of twelve decked ships, eight open vessels and thirty hemioliae, which headed south at full speed to deal with Scerdilaidas. This counterattack by Philip was too slow and missed its targets. Scerdilaidas went on to march into Dassaretia, taking several cities and invading parts of western Macedonia. He looted Pissaeum in Pelagonia and overran some frontier districts of Macedon. Before the winter Philip had occupied the area of Lyncestis, cutting off the direct route from Illyria, and extended his power to Dassaretia. Philip was planning an invasion of Illyria. However, in doing so, he would face not only the lembi of Scerdilaidas, but also the heavier warships of the Roman navy.

=== First Macedonian War ===
Scerdilaidas soon entered into an alliance with Rome. Influenced by Demetrius, Philip's first target was the Illyrian coast. In 216 BC he had built a fleet of one hundred light warships, using Illyrian shipwrights. He led his fleet around the Peloponnese into the Adriatic, gambling that Rome, deeply involved in the Hannibal crisis, would not intervene. Scerdilaidas appealed for help and the Romans sent ten heavy quinqueremes from Sicily. Philip fled and the invasion of Illyria was avoided for the moment. Twice thwarted in attempts at invasion of Illyria by sea, and now constrained by Laevinus' fleet in the Adriatic, Philip spent 213 BC and 212 BC making advances in Illyria by land. Keeping clear of the coast, he took the inland towns of Atintania and Dimale, and subdued the tribe of the Dassaretii and the Illyrian Parthini and the southern part of the Ardiaean State.

Scerdilaidas, with his son Pleuratus III, Longarus of the Dardanian State and Epirus, together with the Aetolian League allied with each other in prepratiuon for Rome's response. During the conflict, Scerdilaidas fought to recover the lands lost during First Illyrian War but the Treaty of Phoenice in 205 BC formally acknowledged the favourable position of Macedonia, including the capture of the southern Illyrian communities. He died sometime before the treaty in 205 BC as only his son Pleuratus III is listed among those present at Phoenice.

== See also ==
- List of rulers of Illyria

== Bibliography ==
- Cabanes, Pierre (2002) [1988]. Dinko Čutura; Bruna Kuntić-Makvić (eds.). Iliri od Bardileja do Gencia (IV. – II. stoljeće prije Krista) [The Illyrians from Bardylis to Gentius (4th – 2nd century BC)] (in Croatian). Translated by Vesna Lisičić. Svitava. ISBN 953-98832-0-2.
- Dzino, Danijel (2010). Illyricum in Roman Politics, 229 BC–AD 68. Cambridge University Press. ISBN 978-0-521-19419-8.
- Stipčević, Aleksandar (1974). The Illyrians: history and culture (1977 ed.). Noyes Press. ISBN 978-0815550525.
- Wilkes, John J. (1992). The Illyrians. Oxford, United Kingdom: Blackwell Publishing. ISBN 0-631-19807-5.
