= Dimale =

Ancient town in Illyria

Coordinates: 40°42′59″N 19°47′49″E

- Διμάλη (Greek)
- Διμάλλον, Dimallum
- Location within Albania
- Type: Settlement
- Periods: Iron Age, Classical, Hellenistic, Roman
- Cultures: Illyrian, Greek, Roman
- Location: Krotinë, Berat County, Albania
- Region: Illyria

Site notes
- Owner: Public

Dimale or Dimallum (Illyrian: Διμάλη /Dimálē; Ancient Greek: Διμάλη or Διμάλλον; Latin: Dimallum) was a town in southern Illyria in classical antiquity which was situated in the vicinity or within the territory of the Parthini, an Illyrian tribe. It was built on a hill of 450 m above sea level, in the hinterland of Apollonia, about 30 km from the eastern coast of the Adriatic. It is located in today Krotinë, Berat County, Albania.

The first walls of Dimale were built around mid-4th century BC when the Illyrians went through a dynamic development founding their own cities. The urban settlement was built on an already existent Illyrian hilltop proto-urban area dating back to the previous century. In the Hellenistic period (between the 3rd and 2nd centuries BC) the town experienced its climax, during a phase marked by intense urban planning, including the construction of a new city wall and the building of several stoas, a temple, and a theater, showing a significant influence of the Ancient Greek culture on the local Illyrian inhabitants. Manufacturing and materials seem to witness an intense exchange with nearby Apollonia.

The fortified town of Dimale was regarded as impenetrable by Illyrians. It was involved in the Second Roman-Illyrian War and the First Roman-Macedonian War.

== Name ==
The Illyrian toponym is attested in literary sources and epigraphic material, written as Διμάλη in Greek script and Dimallum in Latin script.

The toponym belongs to the southeast Dalmatian onomastic area of Illyrian. It is a compound of di + mal. The root mal – is reflected in many ancient Balkan (Illyrian or Thracian) toponyms such as Malontum, Maloventum, Malontina, Dacia Maluensis etc. The Illyrian toponym Dimallum has been connected to Albanian di-male, meaning "two mountains", with the Proto-Albanian form of the second component reconstructed as mol-no. The Illyrian reconstruction of the first component has been rendered as *d(ṷ)i-, 'two'. Therefore Dimale must have meant '(settlement between) two mountains' in Illyrian.

== History ==
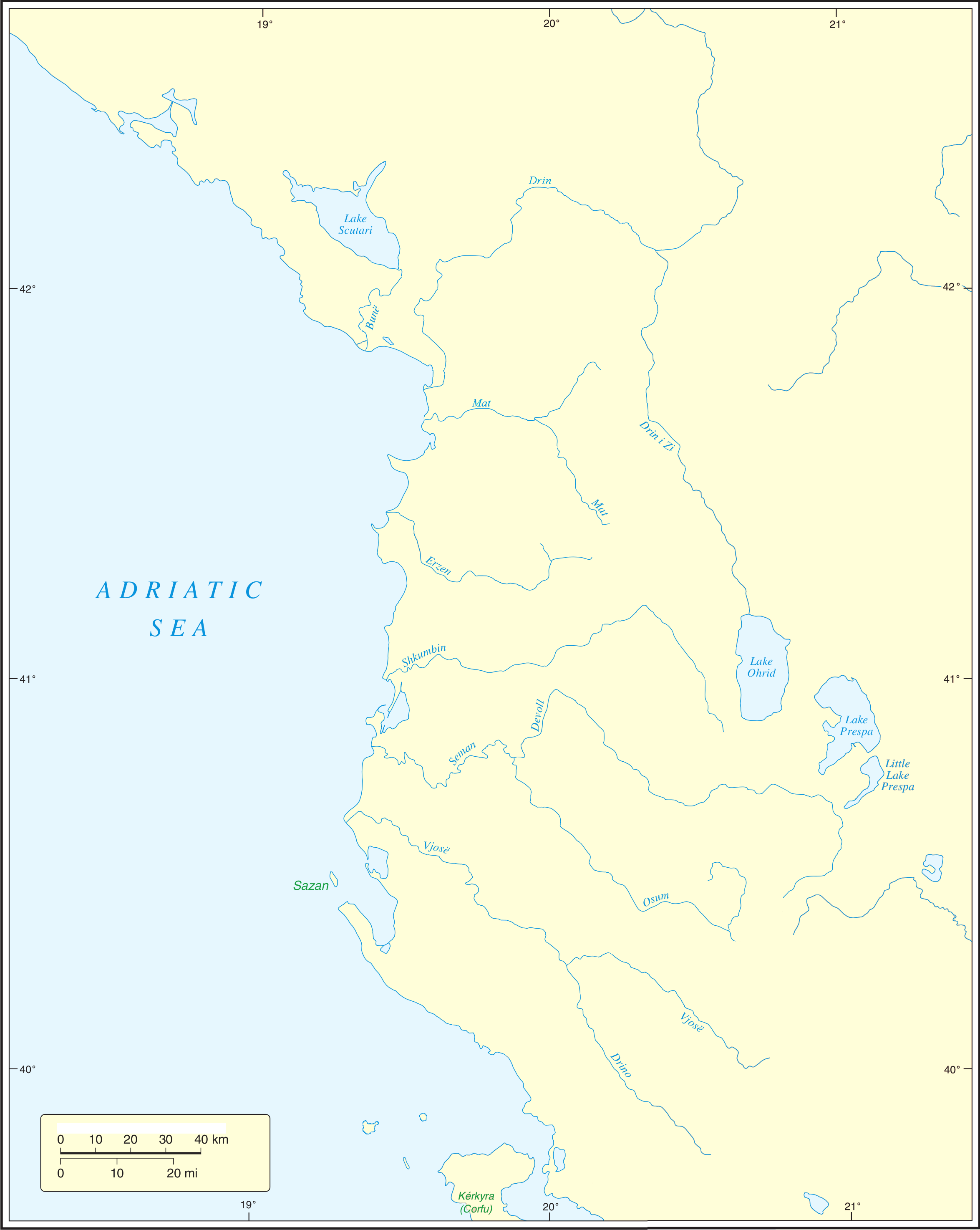

At Dimale an Illyrian pre-urban and proto-urban settlement of the 5th-4th centuries BC is confirmed by pottery found in the site. However physical architectural remains of this period have not been preserved. The Illyrian settlement seems to have included initially only a small inhabited area on the hill, which was fortified in the 4th century BC, representing one of the proto-urban centres that were established in the hinterland of southern Illyria (today Albania), especially during the developed Iron Age. These proto-urban centres were fortified sites different to the small unwalled villages known as komai. The processes of the development of these proto-urban settlements are unclear to scholars, who also have not yet completely understood the role of these sites, whether they were hilltop shelters, towns or meeting centres of regional trading.

The development and prosperity of the town occurred in the 3rd and 2nd centuries BC. During this period a new wall was built replacing the first fortification. The new wall comprised the whole hill of Dimale. The town made available sufficient financial resources to undertake a social and religious construction program. Several stoas, a temple, and a theater were built, showing a significant influence of the Ancient Greek culture on the local Illyrian inhabitants. It has been indicated that the city was a centre of the Illyrian tribe of Parthini, and was belatedly Hellenized under the influence of Apollonia and the Epirote League.

=== Roman period ===
Dimale appears in ancient sources of the Roman period that describes the wars involving the Roman Republic. During the Second Illyrian War in 219 BC, Demetrius of Pharos, after expelling all his opponents from Dimale, fortified the city against an imminent Roman attack and left to defend Pharos. In spite of the fortress of Dimale being considered impregnable, the Romans, under the command of L. Aemilius Paullus, captured the city in a seven-day siege with local Illyrian help. After Demetrius' complete defeat at Roman hands and ultimate flight to Macedonia, Dimale entered into a friendly relationship (amicitia) with Rome. During the First Macedonian War, in 213 or 212 BC, Philip V of Macedon managed to take control of the city but, after an unsuccessful Roman assault led by P. Sempronius Tuditanus in 205 BC, the city reverted to its previous status in the negotiations between Philip V and Rome Phoenice (Treaty of Phoenice) the same year.

== Findings and organization ==
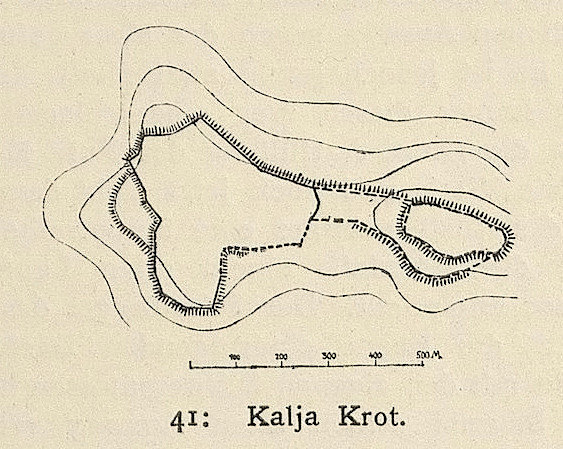
Sketch of the fortress of Dimale at the site of Krotinë by Camillo Praschniker, 1918.

The identification of the site of Krotinë with the ancient Illyrian city became possible thanks to the discovery of ancient tiles stamped with the word DIMALLITAN (Greek: ΔΙΜΑΛΛΙΤΑΝ). The epigraphic material found at Dimale is mainly constituted by stamps on tiles datable between the 3rd and 2nd century BC, and by some stone inscriptions. The inscriptions are written in northwest Doric Greek. The name of the polis is written in the form Διμάλλας, Dimallas, while the name of the ethnicon is written in the genitive plural Διμαλλίταν, Dimallitan.

Epigraphy in Dimale mentions a number of Greek offices such as prytanis, grammateus and phylarchos as well as a single dedication to Phoebus. The inscriptions bear both non-Greek onomastics and Greek onomastics with names typical of Epirus and the Corinthian colonies. The city hosted a number of monuments, typical of the ancient Greek architectural style, such as a stoa. The indication of the office of phylarchos, also attested at Epidamnos, would imply that the Illyrian city of Dimale adopted in Hellenistic times a system of phylai on the model of the nearby Corinthian poleis. Archaeological investigation suggests the economic and cultural influence of nearby Apollonia, however, in terms of institutional organization, the office of phylarchos at Dimale is hardly attributable to the Apollonian influence. It is difficult to determine whether Dimale was the capital of a koinon or organized as a city-state. The inscriptions of the ethnicon depicted on coins do not provide a definitive answer. The proximity of the theater and the agora seems to be closer to the Illyrian-Epirote model rather than to the Greek city model. It can therefore be assumed that the theater was used as a place for political assemblies.

== See also ==
- List of ancient cities in Illyria

== Bibliography ==
- Bengtson, Hermann (2009). Griechische Geschichte: von den Anfängen bis in die römische Kaiserzeit. C.H.Beck. ISBN 978-3-406-58940-9.
- Christ, Karl (1974). Hannibal. Wissenschaftliche Buchgesellschaft. ISBN 978-3-534-06077-1.
- Dautaj, Burhan (2009). "Qeramika e pikturuar helenistike e Dimalit". Iliria (in Albanian). 34: 281–321. doi:10.3406/iliri.2009.1090.
- De Simone, Carlo (2018). "Illyrian". In Klein, Jared; Joseph, Brian; Fritz, Matthias (eds.). Handbook of Comparative and Historical Indo-European Linguistics. Walter de Gruyter GmbH & Co KG. ISBN 978-3-11-054243-1.
- Doçi, Rexhep (2008). "Illyrian-Albanian Toponyms". In Eichler, Ernst; Hilty, Gerold; Löffler, Heinrich; Steger, Hugo; Zgusta, Ladislav (eds.). Namenforschung / Name Studies / Les noms propres. 1. Halbband. Walter de Gruyter. ISBN 978-3110203424.
- Errington, R. M. (1989). "Rome and Greece to 250 B.C.". In A. E. Astin; F. W. Walbank; M. W. Frederiksen; R. M. Ogilvie (eds.). The Cambridge Ancient History: Rome and the Mediterranean to 133 B.C. Vol. VIII (2 ed.). Cambridge University Press. pp. 81–106. ISBN 0-521-23448-4.
- Fiedler, M.; Lahi, B.; Shehi, E.; Pánczél, S.-P.; Velo, K.; Döhner, Gregor (2021). "Ausgrabungen in der Kleinsiedlung Babunjë bei Apollonia (Albanien) Bericht zu den Kampagnen 2018–2019". Mitteilungen des Deutschen Archäologischen Instituts, Römische Abteilung (RM). 127: 110–144.
- Gruen, Erich S. (1986). The Hellenistic world and the coming of Rome. University of California Press. ISBN 978-0-520-05737-1.
- Hatzopoulos, M. B. (1997). "The Borders of Hellenism in Epirus during Antiquity". In M. V. Sakellariou (ed.). Ηπειρος: 4000 χρόνια ελληνικής ιστορίας και πολιτισμού. Ekdotike Athenon. ISBN 9789602133712.
- Illyés, Elemér (1992) [1988]. 2nd (revised) edition 1992). Ethnic continuity in the Carpatho-Danubian area, p. 220].
- Jaupaj, Lavdosh (2019). Etudes des interactions culturelles en aire Illyro-épirote du VII au III siècle av. J.-C (Thesis). Université de Lyon; Instituti i Arkeologjisë (Albanie).
- Kaffka, Thomas (2007). Der Erste Makedonische Krieg: Imperialismus, Hegemoniestreben oder Expansion?- Rom und die östliche Mittelmeerwelt im 2./1. Jh. V. Chr. GRIN Verlag. ISBN 978-3-638-84946-3.
- Lasagni, Chiara (2019). Cresci Marrone, Giovannella; Culasso Gastaldi, Enrica (eds.). Le realtà locali nel mondo greco: Ricerche su poleis ed ethne della Grecia occidentale. Studi e testi di epigrafia. Edizioni dell'Orso. ISBN 978-88-6274-962-6.
- Lippert, Andreas; Matzinger, Joachim (2021). Die Illyrer: Geschichte, Archäologie und Sprache. Kohlhammer Verlag. ISBN 9783170377103.
- Muka, Belisa; Heinzelmann, Michael (2012). "Dimal". Iliria (in Albanian). 36: 387–391. doi:10.3406/iliri.2012.2402.
- Muka, Belisa; Heinzelmann, Michael (2014). "Dimal: new results of the Albanian-German research project". In Molla, Nevilla (ed.). Proceedings of the International Congress of Albanian Archaeological Studies: 65th Anniversary of Albanian Archaeology (21-22 November, Tirana 2013). Tiranë: Botimet Albanologjike. pp. 223–231. ISBN 9789928141286.
- Myrto, Halil (1998). Albania archeologica: bibliografia sistematica dei centri antichi. Vol. 1: A-D. Bari: Edipuglia.
- Papadopoulos, John (2016). "Komai, Colonies and Cities in Epirus and Southern Albania: The Failure of the Polis and the Rise of Urbanism on the Fringes of the Greek World". In Molloy, Barry P.C. (ed.). Of Odysseys and Oddities: Scales and Modes of Interaction Between Prehistoric Aegean Societies and their Neighbours. Oxbow Books. pp. 435–460. ISBN 978-1-78570-232-7.
- Rubini, Mario; Zaio, Paola (2015). "A Paleoanthropological and Paleopathological Approach to the Dimal Population (3rd–2nd Century BCE, Albania)". Kölner und Bonner Archaeologica. 15.
- Šašel Kos, Marjeta (2005). Appian and Illyricum. Narodni Muzej Slovenije. ISBN 978-961-6169-36-3.
- Stipčević, Aleksandar (1974). The Illyrians: history and culture (1977 ed.). Noyes Press. ISBN 978-0815550525.
- Stipčević, Aleksandar (1989). Iliri: povijest, život, kultura [The Illyrians: history and culture] (in Croatian). Školska knjiga. ISBN 9788603991062.
- Wilkes, John J. (1992). The Illyrians. Oxford, United Kingdom: Blackwell Publishing. ISBN 0-631-19807-5.
- Winnifrith, Tom J. (2002). Badlands-borderlands: a history of Northern Epirus/Southern Albania. London: Duckworth. ISBN 0-7156-3201-9.
