= Battle of Phoenice =

Battle between Epirus and the Ardiaeanii

- Part of the Illyrian Wars
Date	230 BC
Location	Phoenice, Chaonia, Epirus
Result	Illyrian victory

Belligerents
Ardiaean Kingdom	Epirote League

Commanders and leaders
Queen Teuta; Scerdilaidas	Unknown

The Battle of Phoenice took place in 230 BC between the forces of the Epirote League and the Ardiaean Kingdom of Illyria.

== Battle ==
Phoenice had been previously taken by Illyrians acting under Queen Teuta, in 230 BC, after a Gaulish garrison of 800 men surrendered to the larger Illyrian force. In reaction, the Epirote League sent in an army to retake Phoenice. They took up positions at a river outside of Phoenice. Meanwhile, 5,000 Illyrians under Scerdilaidas had advanced inland into Epirus from Southern Illyria and reached a pass just outside Antigoneia. The Epirotes reacted by dividing their army, sending a small detachment to protect Antigoneia whilst keeping their main body outside of Phoenice. The Illyrians at Phoenice, seeing the Epirote army was divided, advanced towards their camp and crossed the river. The next day, the forces engaged each other in battle. The Epirote forces were routed and badly defeated, with many being killed or captured, and the remnants of the army fled to Atinania.

== Further advances, preparation for a second battle, and truce ==
Following the battle, the Epirote league had failed to take control of Phoenice, the most powerful city of Epirus. Scerdilaidas forces had also occupied all areas of northern Epirus up until Antigoneia. The Epirotes requested assistance from the Aetolian and Achaean Leagues, with the former having been defeated previously by Illyrians under Agron at Medion in 232 BC. Both leagues sent a combined relief army to the Epirotes which arrived at Helicranum, nearby modern Ioannina, in 230 BC. The Illyrians at Phoenice and those outside Antigoneia under Scerdilaidas joined forces in Epirus and advanced towards Helicranum at the heart of Epirus, preparing to engage the Hellenic force in battle. Illyrians would have probably won again but the course of events in the north made them to be called back to Illyria by Teuta before the battle begun, following an Illyrian revolt in support of the other Illyrian Kingdom of Dardania. The Dardanian ruler, Longarus, had invaded the Ardeai Kingdom of Illyria, sparking an insurrection. Thus, after briefly plundering the Epirote coast, the Illyrians made a truce with the Epirotes and retreated. They also gave up the freemen they had captured at the battle along with the city of Phoenice for a ransom. Afterwards, taking slaves and booty the Illyrians returned to Illyria by sea, whilst the 5,000 under Scerdilaidas retreated northwards to the pass of Antigoneia.

== Aftermath ==
Following the battle and eventual withdrawal of Illyrian forces, the Epirotes saw that the Greek leagues could not protect them. The Epirote League and Acarnania sent ambassadors to Teuta and entered into an alliance with Illyria against the Achaean and Aetolian leagues.

== Sources ==
- Gruen, Erich S. (1986). The Hellenistic World and the Coming of Rome, Volume 1. Berkeley and Los Angeles, California: University of California Press. ISBN 0-520-05737-6.
- Ormerod, Henry Arderne (1997). Piracy in the Ancient World: An Essay in Mediterranean History. Baltimore, Maryland: Johns Hopkins University Press. ISBN 0-8018-5505-5.
- Polybius (1979). Walbank, F. W. (ed.). Polybius: The Rise of the Roman Empire. Translated by Scott-Kilvert, Ian. Penguin Books.
- Sakellariou, M. V. (1997). Epirus, 4000 Years of Greek History and Civilization. Athens, Greece: Ekdotikē Athēnōn. ISBN 960-213-371-6.
- Wilkes, John (1995). The Illyrians. Oxford, United Kingdom: Blackwell Publishers Limited. ISBN 0-631-19807-5.
