= Siege of Medion =

230 BCE siege

- Part of First Illyrian War
Date	June – September 231 BC
Location	Medion, Acarnania (modern-day Greece)
Result	Illyrian victory

Belligerents
Medion; Ardiaean Kingdom of Illyria	Aetolian League

Commanders and leaders
King Agron	Unknown

Strength
Illyrian relief force of 100 lembi and 5,000 men	Unknown

Casualties and losses
Unknown	'A great number' of Aetolians killed 'A still greater number' captured

The siege of Medion was a siege carried out by the Aetolian League in 231 BC against the Ancient Greek city of Medion in Acarnania. The siege triggered an invasion by an Illyrian relief force and ended in the Battle of Medion with an Aetolian defeat.

== Siege ==
Earlier in 231 BC, after the dissolution of the Epirote League, the Aetolian League had requested the city of Medion to join it, but the Acarnanians refused. The Aetolians decided to take Medion by force, beginning the siege in June. The king of Macedon Demetrius II Aetolicus, a rival of the Aetolian League, being himself engaged against the Dardanians, requested Agron of Illyria to intervene and help the Acarnanians. Agron accepted and sent a fleet of 100 lembi and 5,000 men to Medion. This was the largest force any Illyrian king had ever assembled. The Illyrians and Macedon were not necessarily allied, but the former was instead hired to assault the Aetolians at Medion as mercenaries for the latter.

A modern historian, Erich S. Gruen, says that the fact that Demetrius of Macedon had to call the Illyrians to relieve Medion shows that he was incapable of doing so himself. This is supported by another historian, Grainger, who says that Demetrius was preoccupied in northern Macedon in a war against Dardania. As the Illyrians were also at war against the Dardanians, Grainger states it made Agron and Demetrius 'allies'. Polybius, on the other hand, who wrote a contemporary report, simply states that Agron was bribed by Macedon to attack the Aetolians. Polybius possibly wrote this to enforce his previous and later statements that the Illyrians were pirates.

== Battle of Medion ==
The Illyrians landed on the Acarnanian coast in September and marched to Medion to attack the Aetolian besiegers. The Aetolians reacted by sending their own light infantry and cavalry to a higher ground, but a single Illyrian charge, using their close formation and numbers to their advantage, forced the cavalry to retire to the Aetolian hoplites. From their higher ground the Illyrians then charged downwards on the combined Aetolian army, quickly routing them. When at last the Acarnanians from inside the city joined the attack, the Aetolians were defeated and lost many fighters.

== Aftermath ==
After taking many prisoners and much booty, the Illyrians left Medion and sailed to Illyria. Upon their arrival, they reported their victory over the Aetolians to King Agron, in late 231 BC. He is said to have died shortly afterwards, due to his excessive victory celebrations. He was succeeded by his wife, Queen Teuta, the same year. (Note: Appian wrote a vaguer report than Polybius regarding the Illyrians, and wrote it four centuries later, and so seems less reliable. He states that Agron died in 228 BC and was succeeded by Teuta that same year. On the other hand, Polybius states that Agron had died in 231 BC after his victory at Medion and Teuta succeeded him that year.) It is assumed that after the Illyrians defeated the Aetolians at the siege, Medion and the rest of Acarnania allied with Illyria against the Aetolian League to protect the region from future attacks. This is evident as in the naval battle of Paxos, two years later, the Illyrian navy was enforced by ships from Acarnania.
