= Phytia =

Coordinates: 38°40′59″N 21°08′24″E

Epirus in antiquity

Phytia (Ancient Greek: Φυτία), or Phoeteiae or Phoiteiai (Φοιτεῖαι), or Phoetiae or Phoitiai (Φοιτίαι), was a town in the interior of ancient Acarnania, situated on a height west of Stratus, and strongly fortified. It lay on the road from Stratus to Medeon and Limnaea. After the time of Alexander the Great it fell into the hands of the Aetolians, together with the other towns in the west of Acarnania. It was taken by Philip V of Macedon in his expedition against Aetolia in 219 BCE; but the Aetolians, doubtless, obtained possession of it again, either before or after the conquest of Philip by the Romans. It is mentioned as one of the towns of Acarnania in a Greek inscription found at the site of Actium, the date of which is probably prior to the time of Augustus. In this inscription the ethnic form Φοιτιάν occurs.

Its site is located near modern Ag. Georgios, formerly Porta.

== See also ==
- List of cities in ancient Epirus
