= Pleuratus III =

- King

King of Ardiaean
- Reign: c. 205 – c. 181 BC
- Predecessor: Scerdilaidas
- Successor: Gentius
- Died: 181 BC
- Spouse: Eurydice
- Ancient Greek: Πλευρᾶτος
- Dynasty: Ardiaean
- Father: Scerdilaidas

Pleuratus III (Ancient Greek: Πλευρᾶτος; ruled c. 205 – 181 BC) was a ruler of the Illyrian kingdom under the Labeatan dynasty. He was the son of Scerdilaidas. Pleuratus continued his father's pro-Roman policy even more decidedly, so much that his loyalty to Rome was well known, even to other dynasts. He managed to extend the boundaries of the Illyrian State in the south when he was rewarded land annexed by Philip V of Macedon. He became one of the most prominent Illyrian kings of the time all because of his loyalty to the Romans. Pleuratus was succeeded by his son Gentius, who was the last Illyrian king.

== Military activities ==
Pleuratus is listed among the parties to the Treaty of Phoenice in 205 BC. There is evidence that Pleuratus may have reigned with his father as co-regents prior to 205 BC. He may have been preparing for his future as sole king of the Ardiaean State. By 200 BC Pleuratus was ruling alone when he appeared at the Roman headquarters in Dassaretia offering to assist the expedition against Macedonia. The Roman consul P. Sulpicius Galba declined the offer but promised to seek Pleuratus' help when his army was in Macedonia. Pleuratus was allied with Bato of Dardania, and they both invaded Macedonia in 199 BC. Although Pleuratus invaded the territories of Philip V at least once, his contribution to Roman victory in 197 BC would appear to be minimal. It was mostly Bato who caused the Macedonians damage and became a greater threat to its northern borders.

Nonetheless in 196 BC Pleuratus was rewarded with possession of the strategic region of Lynkestis, which had been in Macedonian hands for nearly two centuries after the defeat of Bardyllis in 358 BC. The Ardiaean State was also given control over the Illyrian Parthini, former Roman allies in the Shkumbin valley and cities in Illyria which had been subdued by Philip. Earlier he had perhaps received some regions formerly controlled by the Ardiaean State and annexed by Philip, although this is not certain. This placed under the control of Pleuratus, the route to attack Macedonia from the west, but the Roman intention was rather to deny control to Macedonia than to signal their regard for Pleuratus. Bato on the other hand was given no territorial gains, such as Paeonia which the Dardanians had long longed for.

By 189 BC he was regarded as one of the most ideal client kings of the Romans. in the same year the king of Pergamum and a long-standing ally of the Romans, Eumenes, complained in the Senate that Pleuratus had not deserved so much increase of his power in Illyria. Euemenes insisted that Pleuratus did not actually do anything for the Romans, his only merit lay in the fact that he did not cause them any damage. Be this as it may, Pleuratus became famous for what he had gained from loyalty to the Romans, and Polybius reports that in return for doing nothing he was made the greatest of the rulers of Illyria. Pleuratus also had the Dalmatians in northern Illyria under his control which later got their independence when Gentius came to the throne.

Some of Pleuratus' authority, or indeed most of it, was based on a relatively strong fleet of lembi. Pleuratus was permitted to plunder and devastate the coast of Aetolia with sixty lembi during the next round of warfare in 189 BC, but received no gains of territory at the conclusion of hostilities. This was with no doubt done with the knowledge of the Romans or even on their behalf. In 181 BC Pleuratus died and was succeeded by his son, Gentius. Unlike Pleuratus, Gentius developed bad relations with Rome and finally fought against them in the Third Illyrian War. Pleuratus had three sons, Gentius and Plator, while Caravantius was only the son of his wife Eurydice.

== See also ==
- Illyrian warfare
- List of rulers of Illyria
