= Labeatae =

Illyrian people

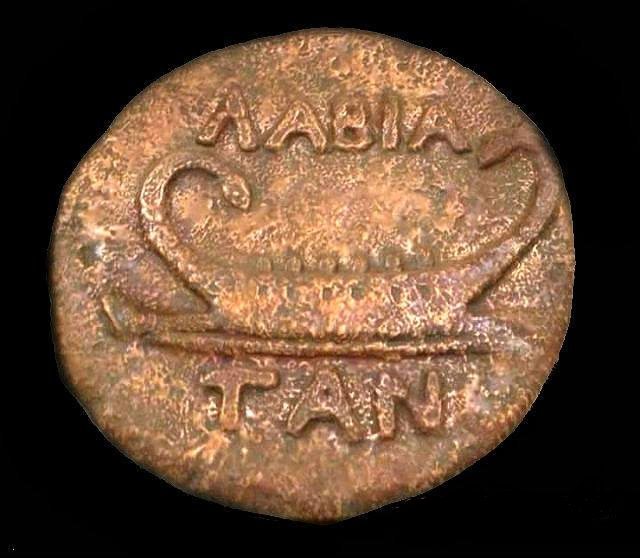
A bronze coin bearing the legend ΛΑΒΙΑΤΑΝ (LABIATAN) and depicting an Illyrian lembus with figureheads of serpents.

The Labeatae, Labeatai or Labeates (Ancient Greek: Λαβεᾶται; Latin: Labeatae) were an Illyrian people that lived on the Adriatic coast of southern Illyria, between modern Albania and Montenegro, around Lake Scodra (the ancient Lacus Labeatis).

Their territory, which was called Labeatis in classical antiquity, seems to have stretched from Lissus at the river Drin in the south, or probably even from the valley of Mat, up to Meteon in the north. Their centre and main stronghold was Skodra, which during the last period of the Illyrian kingdom was the capital city. The Labeatan kingdom was also in possession of Rhizon, the Ardiean capital.

The dynasty of the last Illyrian kings (Scerdilaidas, Pleuratus, Gentius) was Labeatan. It is possible that the decline of the Ardiaean dynasty after Queen Teuta's defeat in the First Illyrian War against Rome caused the emergence of the Labeatan dynasty on the political scene. In Roman times the Labeatae minted coins bearing the inscription of their ethnicon.

== Name ==
=== Attestation ===
Labeatan lands around Lacus Labeatis.

The name is attested for the first time in The Histories by Polybius (2nd century BC), who mentioned the region Λαβεᾶτις Labeatis. Livy in his Ab Urbe Condita Libri mentioned several times the tribal name Labeatae, the region Labeatis and palus Labeatis/lacus Labeatum (Lake Scodra). Coins bearing the inscription of the ethnicon ΛΑΒΙΑΤΑΝ have been found in northern Albania.

=== Etymology ===
The name of the Labeatae is formed by the Lab- particle which is frequently found in the southern Illyrian onomastic area and the common Illyrian suffix -at(ae). The Lab- particle represents a metathesis from Alb- > Lab-, which itself could be related to the appearance of the ethnonym of the Albanians in the same area. It is present in hydronyms like the Llapi river and toponyms like Llapashticë along the later Roman route from Lissus to Ulpiana and indicates the movement of Illyrian tribes from the interior of Illyria to the coastline or vice versa.

== Geography ==
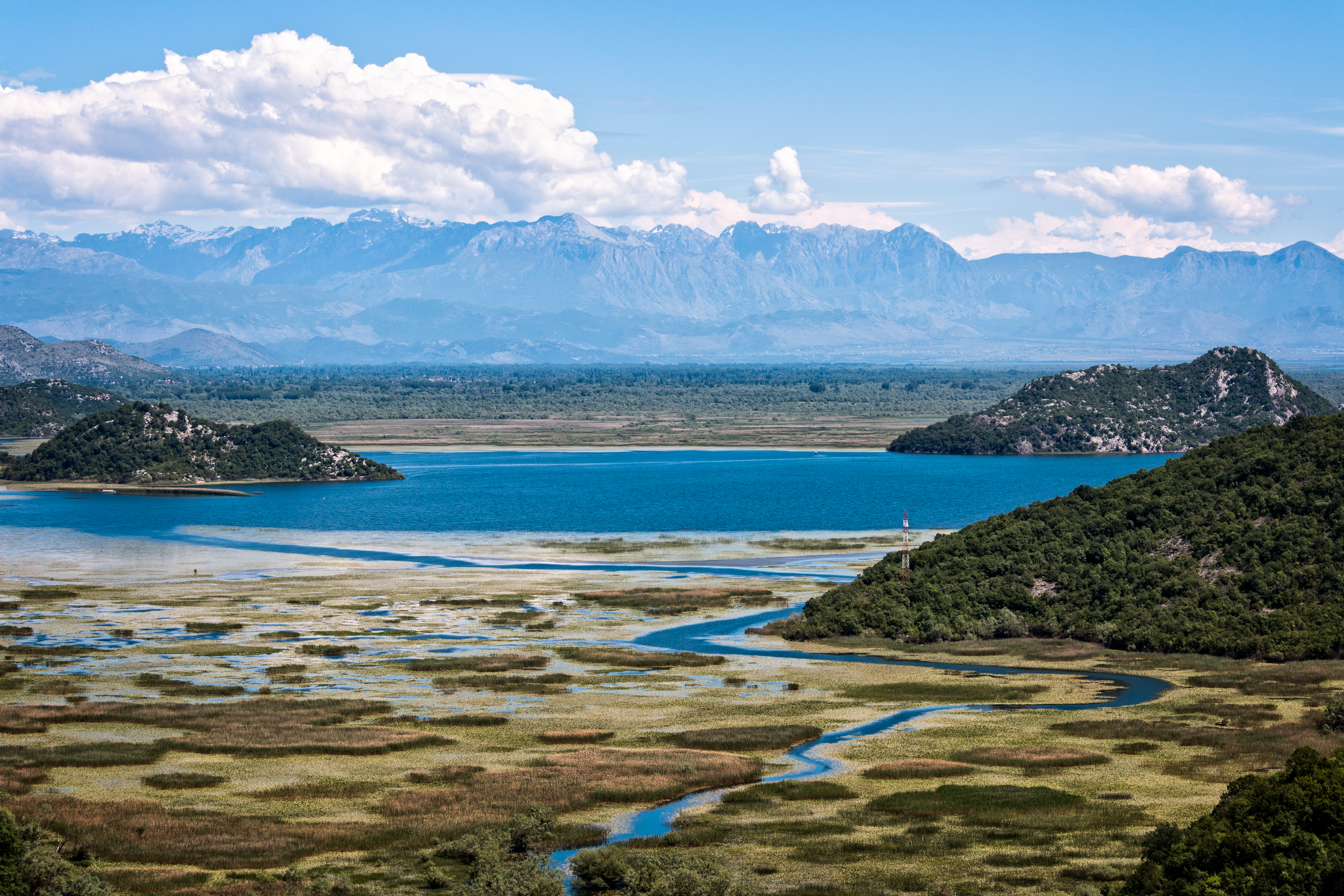
View of Lake Scodra, known as Lacus Labeatis in classical antiquity.

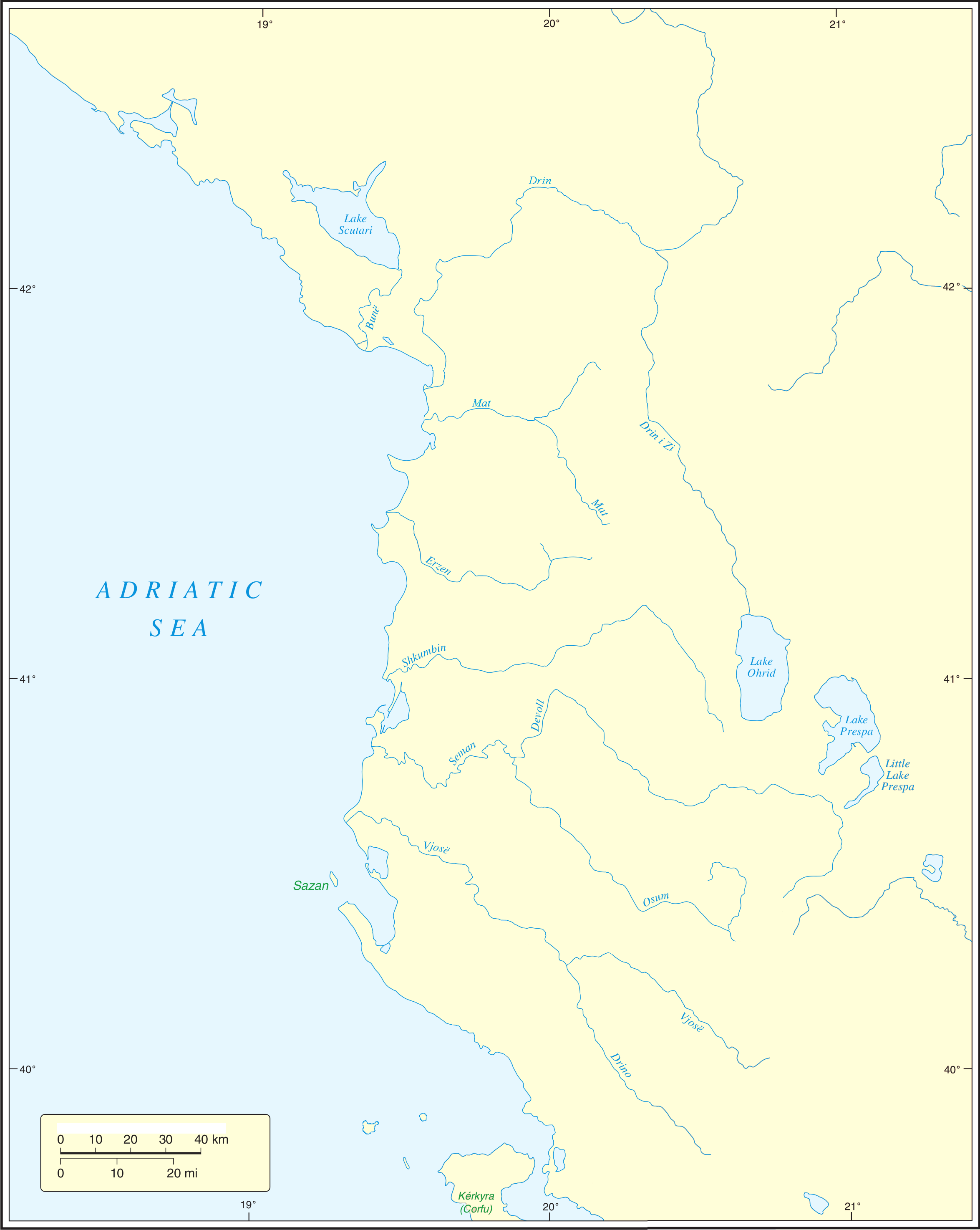

Unlike other Illyrian tribes, the extent of the territory of the Labeatae can be determined with relative precision through some important literary informations from ancient sources. In the accounts of the Roman-Illyrian war involving Gentius, Livy (c. 1st century BC – 1st century AD) described the location of Skodra reporting that the Illyrian king was ruler of the Labeatae and referring to the Lake Shkodra as Lacus Labeatium. The core of the Labeatan territory must therefore have been the area around this lake. The Labeatan king Genthius was also in possession of Rhizon, the capital of the Ardiaean kingdom.

In the description of the place where the envoy of Gentius and Perseus met in 168 BC, Polybius (c. 2nd century BC) reports that the site of Meteon was located in the territory of the Labeatae. It was there that the Illyrian and Macedonian kings established an alliance against the Romans. Livy mentions Meteon as a "city of the Labeates", where at the end of the war Gentius' wife Etleuta, their two sons, and Gentius' brother Caravantius took refuge, implying that this city belonged to Labeatan territory until it was conquered by the Romans. Meteon can be considered as the northern border of Labeatan territory, beyond which Docleatan territory began encompassing the area between the rivers Zeta and Morača. In the west the territory of Labeatae was bordered by the Adriatic Sea, its eastern border was presumably marked by the Accursed Mountains. The southern border may be considered the site of Lissus at the mouth of the river Drin, or further south the mouth of the river Mat, beyond which stretched the region of the Taulantii. In Roman times Lissus was located in the territory of the Labeatae, however ancient sources never relate it with this tribe. Taking into account archaeological and historical considerations, the city of Lissus should have been founded in a Labeatan ethnos context, but perhaps by the time of queen Teuta's fall in the end of the 3rd century BC, it was organized as a proper polis separating from the context of the ethnos.

The territory of the Labeatae comprised a number of relevant rivers, including Drin (Oriund), Buna (Barbana), Kiri (Klausali) and Morača, and the alluvial plains surrounding the Lake Shkodra (Lacus or Palus Labeatis). However, the only navigable rivers in antiquity were Buna and Drin.

After the Roman conquest of southern Illyria, the territory of the Illyrian realm of Gentius was separated into three parts. One of these areas coincided with the Labeatan region.

== Culture ==
By the end of the Bronze Age and the beginning of the Iron Age (c. 1100–800 BC), the formation of a large, cohesive, and quite homogeneous cultural group had already occurred in a well defined territory of the Shkodra region, which was referred in historical sources to as 'the tribe of the Labeatae' in later times.

The number of fortified settlements throughout the Shkodra basin increased at the beginning of the Iron Age, and the proceeding of social and economic diversification occurred in the area. Remarkable examples are the fortified settlement on the site of Gajtan, along with the cemeteries in Shtoj and Shkrel. In Grunas, in the deep mountainous valley of the Shala river in the Dukagjin Highlands, a fortified community has been discovered, dating back to the 11th–8th centuries BC. These fortifications shed new lights on the history of the Illyrian people, and in particular of the inhabitants of the Shkodra region where a politically complex society emerged. In this region the population practiced seasonal transhumance, built mountain fortifications and terraces, and defended a key trade route across an isolated harsh territory. There evidently emerged a social stratum of merchants and artisans.

=== Language ===
The idiom spoken by the tribe of Labeatae belonged to the southeastern Illyrian linguistic area.

=== Religion ===
Several cult-objects with similar features are found in different Illyrian regions, including the territory of the Illyrian tribes of Labeatae, Dassaretii, Daorsi, and comprising also the Iapodes. In particular, a 3rd century BC silvered bronze belt buckle, found inside the Illyrian Tombs of Selca e Poshtme near the western shore of Lake Lychnidus in Dassaretan territory, depicts a scene of warriors and horsemen in combat, with a giant serpent as a protector totem of one of the horsemen; a very similar belt was found also in the necropolis of Gostilj near the Lake Scutari in the territory of the Labeatae, indicating a common hero-cult practice in those regions. Modern scholars suggest that the iconographic representation of the same mythological event includes the Illyrian cults of the serpent, of Cadmus, and of the horseman, the latter being a common Paleo-Balkan hero. The cult of the serpent among the Labeatae is reflected also on their coinage: ships depicted with figureheads of serpents are often engraved on Labeatan coins. The serpents depicted on ships were related to the beliefs of the sailors that these animal totems would have safeguarded them from storms and enemies. The serpent was a powerful symbol among southern Illyrians, who attributed it an important role as a protector animal.

== Economy ==
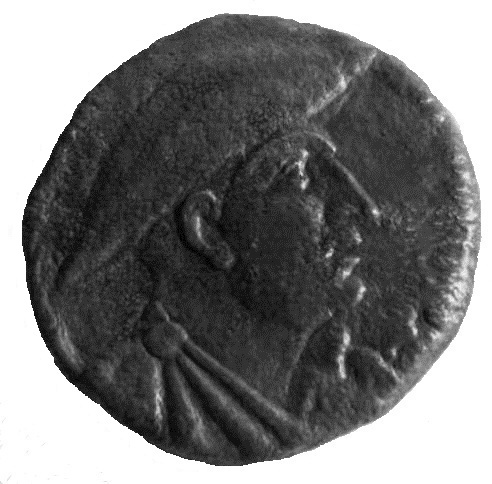
A coin of the Labeatan ruler Gentius.

The Labeates minted coins around the 2nd century BC. Coins bearing the inscription of the ethnicon ΛΑΒΙΑΤΑΝ (LABIATAN) have been found in northern Albania. Illyrian light ships (lembus, pl. lembi) are often engraved on Labeatan coins, sometimes depicted with figureheads of serpents.

During his reign, the Illyrian king Gentius adopted economic measures which are well testified by archaeological finds. He developed a new system of coinage in the territory of his political entity. He allowed to mint coins to the cities of Skodra, Lissus, Rhizon and Lychnidus, allowing it also to the Labeatae and Daorsi, two of the most important Illyrian ethnics of the region at that time. This system considerably expanded the circulation of coins reaching even the deepest areas of the kingdom.

Gentius centralized the production of the coins, interrupting the old minting of Skodra, and starting the production of new coins, which, instead of the engraving of Zeus, adopted the portrait of the king, while on the reverse continued bearing the typical engraving of the Illyrian ship (lembus), but the name of the king was engraved on them instead of the legend of the city. Thus Gentius had evidently removed monetary autonomy from the city of Skodra, and transformed the mint of Skodra's koinon into a royal mint.

Gentius allowed other communities like Lissus, Labeatae and Daorsi to mint coins with the names of their koinon or ethnos, but nevertheless obliged them to respect the state standard, that was to engrave in the coins the portrait of the king and the Illyrian light ships. In addition, the coins of all these political entities had to respect the same size and weight as the coins produced in the royal mint of Skodra.

Coins bearing the ethnicon of the Labeatae were minted also during the Roman period. These coins are mainly found on the mountainous area surrounding Skodra.

== See also ==
- List of ancient Illyrian peoples and tribes
- List of ancient tribes in Illyria

== Bibliography ==
- Boeglin, Yves-Edouard (1968). "La rivière 'Lab' de Serbie". Onoma. 13 (2–3). International Centre of Onomastics: 319–332.
- Cabanes, Pierre (2002) [1988]. Dinko Čutura; Bruna Kuntić-Makvić (eds.). Iliri od Bardileja do Gencia (IV. – II. stoljeće prije Krista) [The Illyrians from Bardylis to Gentius (4th – 2nd century BC)] (in Croatian). Translated by Vesna Lisičić. Svitava. ISBN 953-98832-0-2.
- Šašel Kos, Marjeta (2002). Cambi, Nenad; Čače, Slobodan; Kirigin, Branko (eds.). "Pyrrhus and Illyrian Kingdom(s?)". Greek Influence Along the East Adriatic Coast. Knjiga Mediterana. 26: 101–119. ISBN 9531631549.
- Šašel Kos, Marjeta (2005). "Labeates". In Hubert, Cancik; Schneider, Helmuth; Salazar, Christine F. (eds.). Brill's New Pauly, Antiquity, Volume 7 (K-Lyc). Vol. 7. Brill. ISBN 9789004122703.
- Šašel Kos, Marjeta (2007). "The Illyrian King Ballaeus – Some Historical Aspects". In Berranger, Danièle; Centre de recherches sur les civilisations antiques (eds.). Épire, Illyrie, Macédoine: Mélanges offerts au Professeur Pierre Cabanes. Presses Universitaire Blaise Pascal. ISBN 978-2-84516-351-5.
- Castiglioni, Maria Paola (2010). Cadmos-serpent en Illyrie: itinéraire d'un héros civilisateur. Edizioni Plus. ISBN 9788884927422.
- Dzino, Danijel (2010). Illyricum in Roman Politics, 229 BC–AD 68. Cambridge University Press. ISBN 978-0-521-19419-8.
- Dzino, Danijel (2014). "'Illyrians' in ancient ethnographic discourse". Dialogues d'histoire ancienne. 40 (2): 45–65. doi:10.3917/dha.402.0045.
- Garašanin, Milutin V. (1976). "O problemu starobalkanskog konjanika" [About the Problem of Old Balkan Horseman]. Godišnjak Centra za balkanološka ispitivanja (in Serbo-Croatian). 13. Akademija Nauka i Umjetnosti Bosne i Hercegovine: 273–283.
- Gavoille, Élisabeth (2019). "Mémoire romaine des Balkans: les images de l'illyrie et de la Dalmatie à travers la littérature latine". Folia Linguistica et Litteraria (29). Institute for Language and Literature, Faculty of Philology, Nikšić: 5–18. doi:10.31902/fll.29.2019.1.
- Jaupaj, Lavdosh (2019). Etudes des interactions culturelles en aire Illyro-épirote du VII au III siècle av. J.-C (Thesis). Université de Lyon; Instituti i Arkeologjisë (Albanie).
- Lippert, Andreas; Matzinger, Joachim (2021). Die Illyrer: Geschichte, Archäologie und Sprache. Kohlhammer Verlag. ISBN 9783170377103.
- Mesihović, Salmedin; Šačić, Amra (2015). Historija Ilira [History of Illyrians] (in Bosnian). Sarajevo: Univerzitet u Sarajevu [University of Sarajevo]. ISBN 978-9958-600-65-4.
- Prifti, Kristaq (2002). Instituti i Historisë (Akademia e Shkencave e RSH) (ed.). Historia e popullit shqiptar. Historia e popullit shqiptar në katër vëllime (in Albanian). Vol. 1. Botimet Toena. ISBN 9789992716229.
- Shpuza, Saimir (2014). Dyczek, Piotr (ed.). "Iron Age Fortifications and the Origin of the City in the Territory of Scodra". Novensia. 25. Warszawa: Ośrodek Badań nad Antykiem Europy Południowo-Wschodniej: 105–126. ISBN 978-83-934239-96. ISSN 0860-5777.
- Shehi, Eduard (2015). Terra sigillata en Illyrie méridionale et en Chaonie: importations et productions locales (IIe S. AV. J.-C. -IIe S. AP. J.-C.). Col·lecció Instrumenta (in French). Vol. 48. Barcelona: Universitat de Barcelona, Publicacions i Edicions. ISBN 978-84-475-4238-3.
- Shpuza, Saimir; Dyczek, Piotr (2015). "Scodra, de la capitale du Royaume Illyrien à la capitale de la province romaine". In Jean-Luc Lamboley; Luan Përzhita; Altin Skenderaj (eds.). L'Illyrie Méridionale et l'Épire dans l'Antiquité – VI (in French). Vol. 1. Paris: Diffusion De Boccard. pp. 269–278. ISBN 978-9928-4517-1-2.
- Shpuza, Saimir (2017). Dyczek, Piotr (ed.). "Scodra and the Labeates. Cities, rural fortifications and territorial defense in the Hellenistic period". Novensia. 28. Warszawa: Ośrodek Badań nad Antykiem Europy Południowo-Wschodniej: 41–64. ISBN 978-83-946222-5-1. ISSN 0860-5777.
- Stipčević, Aleksandar (1976). "Simbolismo illirico e simbolismo albanese: appunti introduttivi". Iliria (in Italian). 5: 233–236. doi:10.3406/iliri.1976.1234.
- Stipčević, Aleksandar (1974). The Illyrians: history and culture (1977 ed.). Noyes Press. ISBN 978-0815550525.
- Stipčević, Aleksandar (1989). Iliri: povijest, život, kultura [The Illyrians: history and culture] (in Croatian). Školska knjiga. ISBN 9788603991062.
- Tafilica, Zamir; Baze, Ermal; Lafe, Ols (2023). "Historical Background". In Galaty, Michael L.; Bejko, Lorenc (eds.). Archaeological Investigations in a Northern Albanian Province: Results of the Projekti Arkeologjik i Shkodrës (PASH): Volume One: Survey and Excavation Results. Memoirs Series. Vol. 64. University of Michigan Press. ISBN 9781951538736.
- Waterfield, Robin (2014). Taken at the Flood: The Roman Conquest of Greece. OUP Oxford. ISBN 978-0-19-166414-4.
- Wilkes, John J. (1992). The Illyrians. Oxford, United Kingdom: Blackwell Publishing. ISBN 0-631-19807-5.
