= Parthini =

Illyrian people

The Parthini, Partini or Partheenatai were an Illyrian tribe that lived in southern Illyria (modern Albania). They likely were located in the Shkumbin valley controlling the important route between the Adriatic Sea and Macedonia, which corresponded to the Via Egnatia of Roman times. Consequently, their neighbours to the west were the Taulantii and to the east the Dassaretii in the region of Lychnidus.

== Name ==
The Parthini often appears in ancient accounts describing the Illyrian Wars and Macedonian Wars. Their name was written in Ancient Greek as Παρθῖνοι, Parthînoi, Παρθηνοι, Parthenoi, Παρθεηνᾶται Partheēnâtai and in Latin as Parthini or Partheni. They are mentioned by Livy, Caesar, Strabo vii.; Appian, Illyr. 1; Dion Cass. xli. 49; Cic. in Pis. 40; Pomp. Mela, ii. 3. § 11; Plin. iii. 26.

According to a mythological tradition reported by Appian (2nd century AD), the Parthini were among the South-Illyrian tribes that took their names from the first generation of the descendants of Illyrius, the eponymous ancestor of all the Illyrian peoples.

== Geography ==
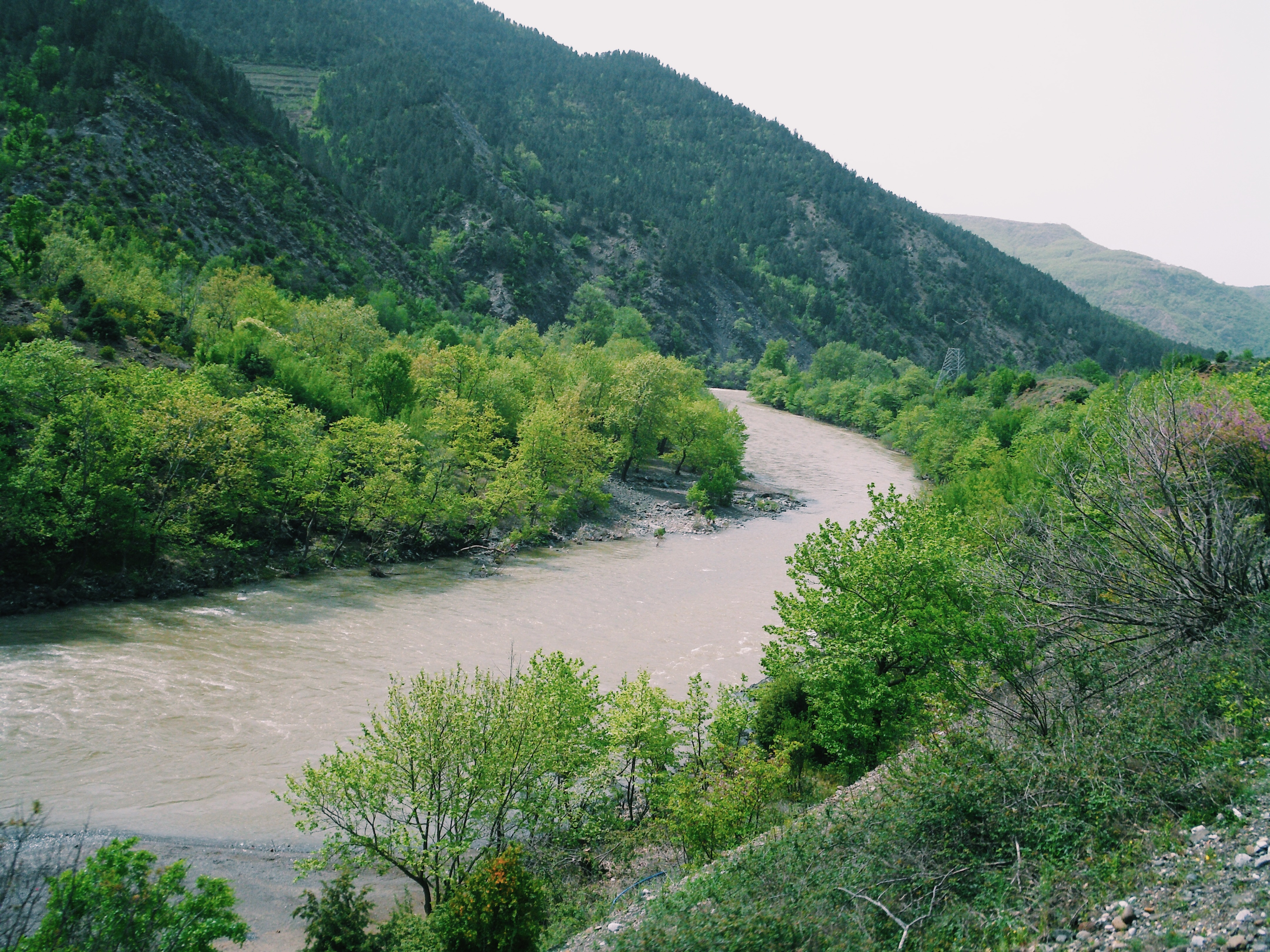
View of Shkumbin; it constituted an important route between the Adriatic Sea and Macedonia. The first part of the Via Egnatia retraced it as a land route.

The Parthini most likely inhabited the area between the hinterland of Dyrrhachium at the Tirana plane in the north, and the hinterland of Apollonia at the Apsus river (Seman) in the south. Their territory likely included the Shkumbin valley, hence they controlled the important route between the Adriatic Sea and Macedonia, which corresponded to the Via Egnatia of Roman times. Initially, the Parthini may have held the lands around Epidamnus-Dyrrhachium, but later they were probably pushed more inland by the Taulantii losing their coastal holdings.

A walled city built in the 4th century BC at the latest has been found on the Gradishtë plateau near Belsh. It developed from an early 7th century BC hilltop settlement, and was located on the route leading from Apollonia along the Apsus river to the Shkumbin. Its ancient name is not known, but it can be assumed to have been the chief settlement of the Parthini. It existed until late antiquity, and was destroyed by the Slavic invasion.

The Illyrian stronghold of Dimale was situated in the vicinity or within the territory of the Parthini. Parthus was a settlement of the Parthini.

== Culture ==
=== Language ===
The idiom spoken by the Parthini is included in the southern Illyrian onomastic province in modern linguistics. The territory they inhabited belongs to the area that is considered in current scholarship as the linguistic core of Illyrian.

=== Religion ===
The Parthini worshiped a supreme god recognized through interpretatio romana as 'Jupiter Parthinus'. It is attested in Latin epigraphic material as I(upiter) O(ptimus) M(aximus) Partinus.

== History ==
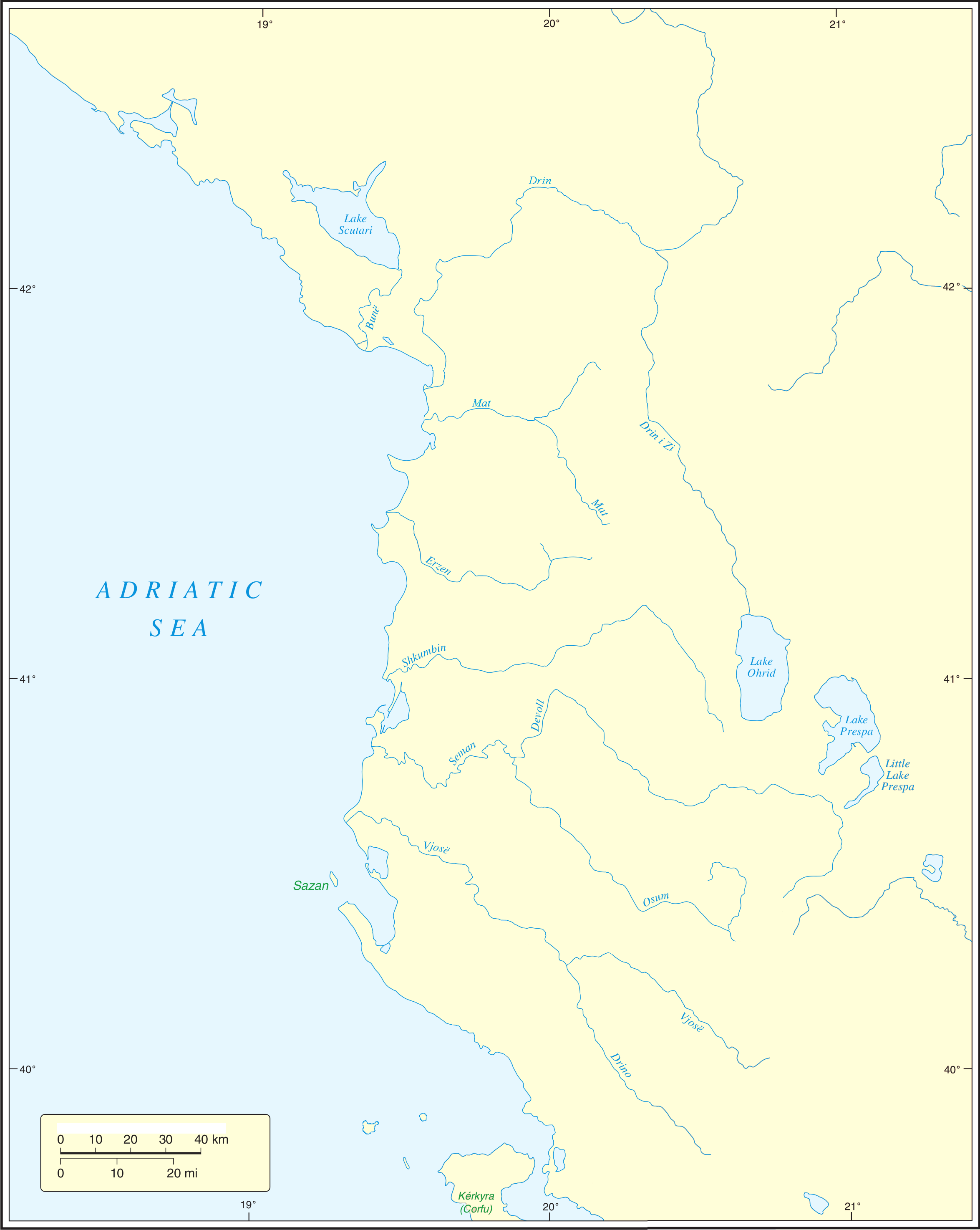

The Parthini are often mentioned in the course of the Roman wars in Illyria and Macedonia, 229 BCE, but as friends rather than foes of the Romans, having submitted at an early period to their arms. (Polyb. ii. 11; Livy xxix. 12.) After the death of Philip, king of Macedon, they appear to have been added to the dominions of Pleuratus III, an Illyrian prince allied to the Romans. (Polyb. xviii. 30; Liv. xxx. 34, xliv. 30.) Their principal town was Parthus (Πάρθος, Steph. B. s. v.), which was taken by Caesar in the course of his campaign with Pompeius. (Caes. B.C. iii. 41.) The double-hilled Dimallum, the strongest among the Illyrian places, with two citadels on two heights, connected by a wall (Polyb. iii. 18, vii. 9), was within their territory. There is no indication, however, of its precise situation, which was probably between Lissus and Epidamnus. Livy mentions (xxix. 12) two other fortresses: Eugenium and Bargulum.

== Economy ==
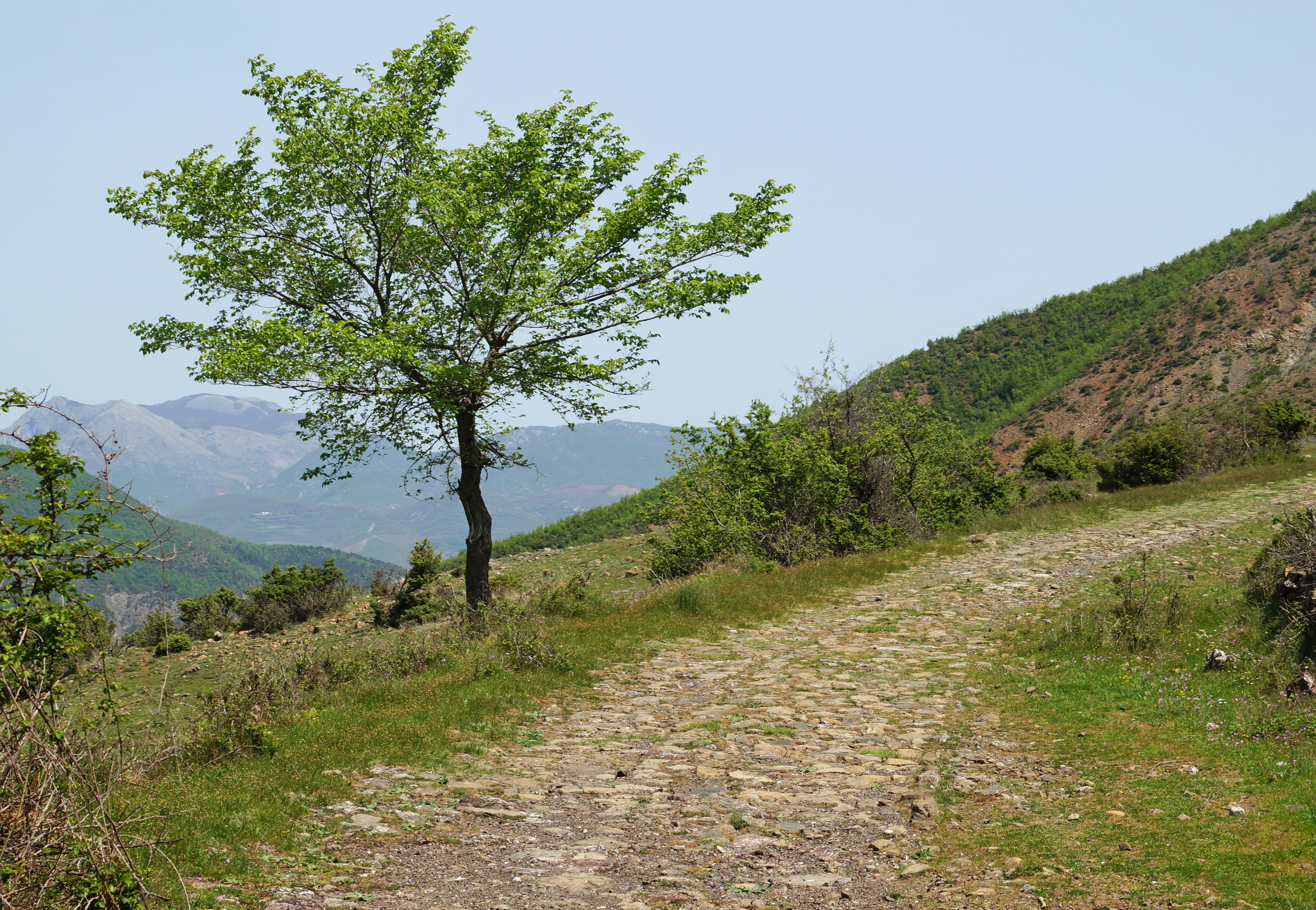
The ancient Via Egnatia in Librazhd, Albania. The first part of the road crossed Illyricum mainly in Parthinian territory.

Located in the inlands of southern Illyria, the Parthini controlled the important route between the Adriatic Sea and Macedonia, which corresponded to the Via Egnatia of Roman times.

Ancient historical sources testify agricultural economy among the Parthini, who were attested to have cultivated corn in Roman times. During the Great Roman Civil War the Parthini were obliged to deliver their corn supply for Pompey's troops. The situation changed with Caesar's arrival in Illyria. Once he had landed in Palaeste on the Ceraunian Mountains, the Illyrian communities, which were garrisoned by Pompey and the Senate, welcomed Caesar.

== See also ==
- List of ancient Illyrian peoples and tribes

== Bibliography ==
- Burton, Paul J. (2017). Rome and the Third Macedonian War. Cambridge University Press. ISBN 978-1-107-10444-0.
- Cabanes, Pierre (2002) [1988]. Dinko Čutura; Bruna Kuntić-Makvić (eds.). Iliri od Bardileja do Gencia (IV. – II. stoljeće prije Krista) [The Illyrians from Bardylis to Gentius (4th – 2nd century BC)] (in Croatian). Translated by Vesna Lisičić. Svitava. ISBN 953-98832-0-2.
- Cabanes, Pierre (2007). "Parthini". In Hubert, Cancik; Schneider, Helmuth; Salazar, Christine F. (eds.). Brill's New Pauly, Antiquity, Volume 10 (Obl-phe). Brill's New Pauly. Vol. 7. Brill. ISBN 978-9004142152.
- Ceka, Hasan (2001). "Ndikimi zotërues i kultit ilir mbi monetat antike të vendit tonë / The Influence of the Illyrian Cult on Ancient Coins from Albania". Iliria. 30 (1): 5–8. doi:10.3406/iliri.2001.1723.
- Dzino, Danijel (2010). Illyricum in Roman Politics, 229 BC–AD 68. Cambridge University Press. ISBN 978-0-521-19419-8.
- Dzino, Danijel (2014). "'Illyrians' in ancient ethnographic discourse". Dialogues d'histoire ancienne. 40 (2): 45–65. doi:10.3917/dha.402.0045.
- Eckstein, Arthur M. (2008). Rome Enters the Greek East From Anarchy to Hierarchy in the Hellenistic Mediterranean, 230–170 BC. Blackwell Publishing. ISBN 978-1-4051-6072-8.
- Haebler, Claus (2002). "Palaeo-Balkanic languages". In Hubert, Cancik; Schneider, Helmuth; Salazar, Christine F.; Orton, David E. (eds.). Brill's New Pauly: Ark–Kas. Brill's New Pauly. Vol. 2. Brill. ISBN 9004122656.
- Jaupaj, Lavdosh (2019). Etudes des interactions culturelles en aire Illyro-épirote du VII au III siècle av. J.-C (Thesis). Université de Lyon; Instituti i Arkeologjisë (Albanie).
- Lippert, Andreas; Matzinger, Joachim (2021). Die Illyrer: Geschichte, Archäologie und Sprache. Kohlhammer Verlag. ISBN 9783170377103.
- Mesihović, Salmedin; Šačić, Amra (2015). Historija Ilira [History of Illyrians] (in Bosnian). Sarajevo: Univerzitet u Sarajevu [University of Sarajevo]. ISBN 978-9958-600-65-4.
- Miraj, Lida (1992). Stazio, Attilio; Ceccoli, Stefania (eds.). La Magna Grecia e i grandi santuari della madrepatria: atti del trentunesimo Convegno di studi sulla Magna Grecia. Atti del Convegno di studi sulla Magna Grecia (in Italian). Vol. 31. Istituto per la storia e l'archeologia della Magna Grecia. pp. 140–146.
- Nicols, Marianne Schoenlin (1992). Appearance and Reality: A Study of the Clientele of Pompey the Great. Berkeley: University of California.
- Papazoglu, Fanula (1978). The Central Balkan Tribes in pre-Roman Times: Triballi, Autariatae, Dardanians, Scordisci and Moesians. Amsterdam: Hakkert. ISBN 9789025607937.
- Papazoglu, Fanula (1988). Les villes de Macédoine à l'époque romaine (in French). Greece: Ecole française d'Athènes. ISBN 9782869580145.
- Polomé, Edgar C. (1983). "The Linguistic Situation in the Western Provinces of the Roman Empire". In Wolfgang Haase (ed.). Sprache und Literatur (Sprachen und Schriften [Forts.]). Walter de Gruyter. pp. 509–553. ISBN 3110847035.
- Šašel Kos, Marjeta (2002). "Pyrrhus and Illyrian Kingdom(s?)". Greek Influence Along the East Adriatic Coast. Knjiga Mediterana. 26: 101–119. ISBN 9531631549.
- Šašel Kos, Marjeta (2004). "Mythological stories concerning Illyria and its name". In P. Cabanes; J.-L. Lamboley (eds.). L'Illyrie méridionale et l'Epire dans l'Antiquité. Vol. 4. pp. 493–504.
- Šašel Kos, Marjeta (2005). Appian and Illyricum. Narodni muzej Slovenije. ISBN 961616936X.
- Shpuza, Saïmir (2009). "Aspekte të ekonomisë antike ilire dhe epirote / Aspects of Ancient Illyrian and Epirotic Economy". Iliria. 34: 91–110. doi:10.3406/iliri.2009.1083.
- Stipčević, Alexander (1989). Iliri: povijest, život, kultura. Zagreb: Školska knjiga. ISBN 9788603991062.
- Stocker, Sharon R. (2009). Illyrian Apollonia: Toward a New Ktisis and Developmental History of the Colony.
- Wilkes, J. J. (1996). "The Danubian and Balkan provinces". In Alan K. Bowman; Edward Champlin; Andrew Linto (eds.). The Cambridge Ancient History: The Augustan Empire, 43 B.C—A.D. 69. Vol. 10. Cambridge University Press. pp. 545–585. ISBN 0521264308.
- Winnifrith, Tom J. (2002). Badlands-borderlands: a history of Northern Epirus/Southern Albania. London: Duckworth. ISBN 0-7156-3201-9.
