= Parthus =

Unlocated ancient city of the Illyrians

Parthus or Parthos (Ancient Greek: Πάρθος; Latin: Parthus) was a settlement of the Illyrian tribe of the Parthini in southern Illyria, modern Albania. Although different sites in central Albania have been proposed, its exact location has not yet been found.

== See also ==
- List of settlements in Illyria

== Bibliography ==
- Boardman, John; Sollberger, E. (1982). J. Boardman; I. E. S. Edwards; N. G. L. Hammond; E. Sollberger (eds.). The Cambridge Ancient History: The Prehistory of the Balkans; and the Middle East and the Aegean world, tenth to eighth centuries B.C. Vol. III (part 1) (2 ed.). Cambridge University Press. ISBN 0521224969.
- Šašel Kos, Marjeta (2005). Appian and Illyricum. Narodni muzej Slovenije. ISBN 961616936X.
