= Lembus =

Ancient term for a variety of small ships

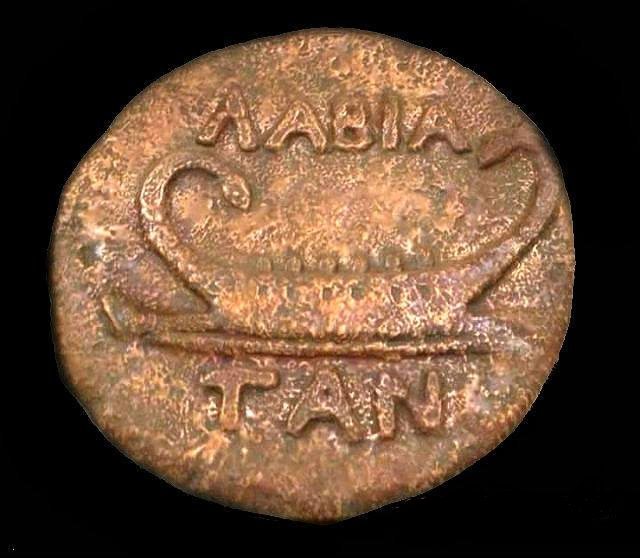
Illyrian lembs engraved on Labeatan coins of the 2nd century BC.

The lemb, lembus or lembos (Ancient Greek: λέμβος, lembos; Latin: lembus) was an ancient wide term covering a range of small ships, which were used for different purposes, both civilian and military.

It was small and light, with a low freeboard. It was a fast and maneuverable warship, capable of carrying 50 men in addition to the rowers. It was the galley used by Illyrian pirates. Illyrians used them at Medion under Agron, and at Elis, Messene, Phoenice, Issa, Epidamnus, Apollonia, Corcyra and Paxus under Teuta. Philip V of Macedon used lembi during the First Macedonian War.

The lemb was more common among the Illyrians of the southern Adriatic, while in the northern Adriatic, the more common ship was the liburna which originated from the Liburnians. The lemb appears in several Illyrian coins of the southern Adriatic communities, which were politically connected with the Illyrian kingdom, like the Labeatae, the Daorsi, and the cities of Scodra and Lissus.

== Name ==
The term λέμβος, lembos has been recorded in Classical sources since the 4th century BC onwards. The Illyric-Greek term λέμβος was later Latinized as lembus. The ultimate source of the term is obscure. An Illyrian origin has been suggested.

== Usage ==
The lembi were small ships used originally for civilian purposes, and thereafter adapted to warfare usages, with at least three sub-types:

- small ship used in the Aegean as towing boat, ship's boat, transportation boat, and platform for the catapults;
- southern Adriatic (Illyrian) lemb for naval warfare, piracy (also attacking unarmed ships), trade, and swift transport of the troops: the southern Adriatic shipbuilders most likely adopted and developed an already existing small and fast Aegean type of ship;
- upgraded Macedonian fighting lemb: a Macedonian prototype of the Illyrian lemb was built at the behest of king Philip V of Macedon, who ordered one hundred lembs to be built by Illyrian shipbuilders, in order to transport his troops in 216 BC. Philip's shipbuilders further developed in 214 BC this ship type by enlarging it into a bireme warship. Those warships were even fitted with rams.
