= Illyrian Wars =

Wars in the Mediterranean, 229–168 BC

The Illyrian Wars were a series of wars fought between the Roman Republic and the Illyrian kingdom under the Ardiaei and Labeatae. In the First Illyrian War, which lasted from 229 BC to 228 BC, Rome's concern was that the trade across the Adriatic Sea increased after the First Punic War at a time when Ardiaei power increased under queen Teuta. Attacks on trading vessels of Rome's Italic allies by Illyrian pirates and the death of a Roman envoy named Coruncanius on Teuta's orders, prompted the Roman senate to dispatch a Roman army under the command of the consuls Lucius Postumius Albinus and Gnaeus Fulvius Centumalus. Rome expelled Illyrian garrisons from a number of Greek cities including Epidamnus, Apollonia, Corcyra, Pharos and established a protectorate over these Greek towns. The Romans also set up Demetrius of Pharos as a power in Illyria to counterbalance the power of Teuta.

The Second Illyrian War lasted from 220 BC to 219 BC. In 219 BC, the Roman Republic was at war with the Celts of Cisalpine Gaul, and the Second Punic War with Carthage was beginning. These distractions gave Demetrius the time he needed to build a new Illyrian war fleet. Leading this fleet of 90 ships, Demetrius sailed south of Lissus, violating his earlier treaty and starting the war. Demetrius' fleet first attacked Pylos, where he captured 50 ships after several attempts. From Pylos, the fleet sailed to the Cyclades, quelling any resistance that they found on the way. Demetrius foolishly sent a fleet across the Adriatic, and, with the Illyrian forces divided, the fortified city of Dimale was captured by the Roman fleet under Lucius Aemilius Paulus. From Dimale the navy went towards Pharos. The forces of Rome routed the Illyrians and Demetrius fled to Macedon, where he became a trusted councillor at the court of Philip V of Macedon, and remained there until his death at Messene in 214 BC.

In 171 BC, the Illyrian king Gentius of the Labeatae was allied with the Romans against the Macedonians. But in 169 BC he changed sides and allied himself with Perseus of Macedon. During the Third Illyrian War, in 168 BC, he arrested two Roman legati and destroyed the cities of Apollonia and Dyrrhachium, which were allied to Rome. He was defeated at Scodra by a Roman force under L. Anicius Gallus, and in 167 BC he was brought to Rome as a captive to participate in Gallus' triumph, after which he was interned at Iguvium.

== Prelude ==
=== Expansion under Agron ===
In the second half of the third century BC, the Ardiaei kingdom was transformed into a formidable power under the leadership of Agron. During this time, Agron invaded part of Corcyra, Epidamnos and Pharos in succession, establishing garrisons in them. An invasion towards Epirus was repulsed. The new force disposed of 'the most powerful which could carry 50 soldiers in addition to the rowersforce, both by land and sea, of any of the kings who had reigned in Illyria before him', according to Polybius (2.2). The Illyrians used the lembus, a small and fast warship with a single bank of oars. Raids by sea from the Adriatic and Ionian were probably a familiar threat to the north-western Greeks. What was new was the use of a land army to follow up and profit from the victories gained by the navy. The Greek cities (poleis) on the coast of Illyria were systematically attacked and perhaps already conquered by Agron's forces. Rome answered an appeal from the island of Issa, threatened by Agron, by sending envoys. They never got there. They were attacked en route by Illyrian vessels, and one of them was killed, together with an Issaean ambassador.

That time a number of political events marked the adjacent Greek states. In 234 BC, the royal succession in Epirus came to an end, and a federal republic was instituted. In the south, the western part of Acarnania seceded from this arrangement. Their independence was soon threatened by the Aetolians, who began to occupy territory around the Gulf of Ambracia, including Pyrrhus' old capital, Ambracia, which forced the Epirotes to establish a new center at Phoenice. Besieged at Medion, the Acarnanians sought assistance from Demetrius II of Macedonia, who for the most of his reign had been at war with the Aetolian and Achaean Leagues. In response, the king requested assistance from Agron to relieve the siege.

The Illyrian attack under Agron was mounted in either 232 or 231 BC. One hundred lembi, with 5000 men on board, sailed up to land at Medion. They then formed up in the order that was usual in their own country, and advanced in their several companies against the Aetolian lines. The Aetolians drew up the greater part of their hoplites and cavalry in front of their own lines on the level ground and, with a portion of their cavalry and their light infantry, they hastened to occupy some rising ground in front of their camp, which nature had made easily defensible. A single charge, however, by the Illyrians, whose numbers and close order gave them irresistible weight, served to dislodge the light-armed troops, and forced the cavalry who were on the ground with them to retire to the hoplites. The Medionians joined the action by sallying out of the town and charging the Aetolians, thus, after killing a great number, and taking a still greater number prisoners, and becoming masters also of their arms and baggage, the Illyrians, having carried out the orders of Agron, conveyed their baggage and the rest of their booty to their boats and immediately set sail for their own country. This defeat of the Aetolians, who were famed for their victory over the invading Gauls a generation before, caused a sensation in Greece.

=== Raid against Phoenice ===
After Agron's death, when leadership passed to his widow, Teuta, Illyrian expansion continued successfully. Under her authority, Illyrian ships were given considerable freedom to conduct maritime raids. In 231 BC, Illyrian land and naval forces launched an expedition into the Peloponnese, attacking Elis and Messenia. On their way home, Teuta sent her general Scerdilaidas to capture the city of Phoenice in Epirus. The city was captured and the ensuing battle was won. A truce was agreed and Phoenice was returned for a price, along with the release of prisoners. The continued Illyrian success was another shock for the Greeks. The Epirotes signified their acceptance of the Illyrian victory by sending envoys to Teuta promising cooperation with them and hostility towards the Leagues of Greece. Phoenice was the most prosperous city in Epirus, and the centre for the growing commerce with Italy. It was Illyrian interference with that commerce that brought Roman forces across the Adriatic for the first time. Nevertheless, the Illyrians had to withdraw from Phoenice in order to deal with an internal rebellion.

== First Illyrian War ==
First Illyrian War
- Part of Illyrian Wars
Date	229 BC – 228 BC
Location	Illyria
Result	Roman victory

Belligerents
Roman Republic	Illyrian Kingdom

Commanders and leaders
Gnaeus Fulvius Centumalus Maximus; Aulus Postumius; Supported by Demetrius of Pharos	Teuta

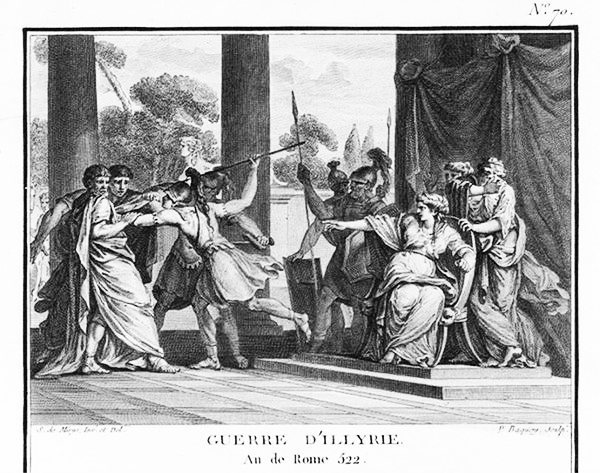
Queen Teuta orders her guards to murder the Roman envoys – Augustyn Mirys

Even before the war with Carthage (264–241 BC), the Romans had been aware of the danger to the Adriatic coast of Italy from seaborne attack. In 246 BC, a colony of Roman citizens was settled at Brundisium to keep a watch on the Ionian gulf. During their occupation of Phoenice, a number of Illyrian ships had engaged in privateering against Italian merchants. So many were robbed, murdered or captured that the Roman Senate, after ignoring earlier complaints, realized that something had to be done. Polybius (2.8) furnishes a suspiciously vivid account of a Roman embassy to Teuta, a version of events that was intended to justify the Roman invasion of Illyria. It was led by the brothers L. and C. Coruncanius. On arrival, they found Teuta celebrating the end of a rebellion in Illyria and engaged in laying siege to the Greek island of Issa, 'the last town which held out'. When the ambassadors complained of injuries to Romans, Teuta promised that no royal forces would harm them, but said that she was unable to put an end to the tradition of private enterprise. One of the ambassadors lost his temper; in response, the queen arranged for the insolent envoy to be murdered on his homeward voyage. News of this caused the Romans to prepare for war: legions were raised and a fleet assembled, and there was general indignation at 'the queen's violation of the law of nations'.

=== Corcyra and Paxos (229 BC) ===
In 229 BC, the Roman intervention in Illyria appears to have taken Queen Teuta and the Illyrians by surprise. As soon as the sailing conditions were met, Teuta dispatched a substantial naval force, which was larger than those sent in previous campaigns, towards Corcyra. Some ships landed at Epidamnos, where troops entered the city, with concealed weapons, under the pretext to procure food and water. These troops almost captured the city, but were pushed back after a fight. After this setback, the detachment rejoined the main Illyrian fleet, which had already begun its attack on Corcyra. The Corcyraeans, along with Apollonia and Epidamnos, sought assistance from the Leagues of Greece. In response, an allied force of ten Achaean warships, united with the Aetolian navy, confronted the Illyrian fleet, which was supported by seven Acarnanian ships, near the island of Paxos, south of Corcyra. During the battle, the Illyrians employed more effective tactics, capturing four Greek triremes and sinking a quinquereme. The remaining Greeks escaped the battle. Following this victory, Corcyra capitulated and an Illyrian garrison, commanded by Demetrius of Pharos, was installed on the island. The main Illyrian force sailed back north for another attack on Epidamnos. The Illyrians were now on the point of consolidating their control on all of the coastline north of the Gulf of Corinth, including all of the sea routes to Sicily and Italy via Corcyra.

=== Roman offensive ===
The Roman consul Gnaeus Fulvius Centumalus sailed his 200 ships to Corcyra to raise the siege, despite having learned that the island had already surrendered. He was in secret negotiations with Demetrius, who had fallen out of favour with Teuta, so Corcyra welcomed the Romans and, with the aid of Demetrius, surrendered its garrison. The city became a 'friend of Rome' and would henceforward rely on Roman protection from the Illyrians. Demetrius now served as an adviser to the Roman commanders for the rest of the war. Meanwhile, the consul Lucius Postumius Albinus brought an army of 20,000 infantry and 2,000 cavalry across from Brundisium to Apollonia, which now joined the Roman alliance. The fleet under Fulvius reached Apollonia and the two forces advanced toward Epidamnos, causing the Illyrians to abandon the siege and disperse. The city was received into Roman protection and the army now moved inland among the Illyrian peoples of the hinterland. Here, the Romans received delegations from many peoples, including the Atintani and Parthini, from whom a formal surrender was accepted. At sea, the blockade of Issa was raised and the city also received Roman protection. As the Romans approached the Illyrian heartlands, opposition stiffened. The fleet moved northwards and attacked coastal towns, one of which being the unidentified Noutria. Roman losses included a magistrate of the Republic and some military tribunes, although 20 ships laden with plunder were intercepted. The besiegers of Issa fled to Arbo and Teuta retreated to her capital, Rhizon in the Gulf of Kotor. The Romans decided enough had been achieved and hostilities ceased. The consuls handed over the kingdom to Demetrius and withdrew the fleet and army to Italy under Fulvius. Having assembled 40 ships and some troops from allies in the area, the other consul remained in Illyria to keep watch on the Ardiaei and the peoples under Roman protection.

=== Peace treaty (228 BC) ===
Before the end of winter, Teuta's envoys appeared in Rome and a treaty was concluded. According to its terms, the queen would pay tribute (or perhaps an indemnity) to Rome, abandon Illyria, except for a few places, and promise not to sail south of Lissus at the mouth of the Drin with more than two ships, and even those had to be unarmed. The terms of the settlement were conveyed to the Leagues in Greece, where they were well received. The Illyrians had been forced to give up all their recent conquests south of the Drin. The Romans had gained control of the strategic ports of Epidamnos, Apollonia and Corcyra. In the hinterland, several of the Illyrian tribes now had the status of Rome clients, as was certainly the case with the Parthini in the Gensus (Shkumbin) valley and the Atintani further south. Moreover, not only were the Ardiaei prevented from moving at will by land and sea into Epirus and western Greece, but they were now cut off from the inland route to Macedonia, their patron and ally against the Greek Leagues.

== Second Illyrian War ==
Second Illyrian War
- Part of Illyrian Wars
Date	220 BC – 219 BC
Location	Illyria
Result	Roman victory

Belligerents
Roman Republic	Illyrian Kingdom

Commanders and leaders
Unknown	Demetrius of Pharos

=== Revival of power ===
The Mediterranean in 218 BC

The decade after 229 BC witnessed a revival of Illyrian power under Demetrius, who succeeded Teuta. Following the war, Demetrius married Triteuta, Agron's first wife and mother of Pinnes, in or around 222 BC, which consolidated his position. His marriage to Triteuta meant that Demetrius formally took over the regency of the Ardiaean Kingdom. Demetrius' own influence was thereby greatly extended, and the fundamental weakness of the Ardiaean Kingdom after 229 BC, that there was no competent regent for Pinnes, was relieved. The king began to renew traditional Illyrian ties with Macedonia. In 222 BC, an Illyrian corps of 1,600 men fought with distinction under the command of Demetrius at Sellasia, where the Macedonians won a conclusive victory over the Spartans. After Sellasia, Demetrius began attempting to extend his control over Illyria at the expense of Rome.

Before then, when Rome was preoccupied with a war against the Celtic peoples of the Po Valley in northern Italy from 225 to 222 BC, Demetrius detached the Illyrian Atintani from their Roman alliance. In addition, he sailed south of Lissus, Lezhë in present-day Albania, and engaged in piracy in contravention of the settlement in 228 BC. In 221 BC, Demetrius also created an alliance with the Illyrian Histri at the head of the Adriatic, which tribe was interfering with Roman supply ships. A Roman fleet soon attacked the Histri. Early in the summer of 221 BC, when tension was rising in Greece as Macedonia made an alliance with the Achaean League against the Aetolian League, the Illyrians attacked in their traditional manner.

In 220 BC, Demetrius and the Illyrian commander, Scerdilaidas, sailed south of Lissus with 90 lembi. An assault on Pylos in the western Peloponnese initially failed, but Demetrius eventually captured 50 ships. Afterwards, the Illyrians separated their forces; Demetrius and his forces plundered the Cyclades, while Scerdilaidas' forces returned north to Illyria. On putting in at Naupactus with forty ships, Scerdilaidas was encouraged by his brother-in-law Amynas, king of the Athamanes, to join the Aetolians in their planned invasion of Achaea. With help from Cynaethan traitors, they attacked, seized and burned Cynaetha, a town in northern Arcadia located on the northern slope of the Aroanian Mountains. They also attacked, but failed to take, Cleitor. Meanwhile, Demetrius continued on into the Aegean with 50 ships. He sailed to the Cyclades, where he extorted tribute from some of the islands and plundered the others. Chased by Rhodian warships, Demetrius put into Cenchreae, the Aegean port of Corinth. At the same time, the Macedonian commander in Corinth, Taurion, learned of the invasion by Scerdilaidas and the Aetolians. Taking his cue from the Aetolians, Taurion agreed to drag Demetrius' ships across the Isthmus to bring them into play in the Gulf of Corinth, in return for Demetrius' assistance against the Aetolians. Although Demetrius conducted a few raids on the Aetolian coast, he was too late to hinder the Aetolians' return from Achaea.

After returning to the Ardiaean Kingdom, Demetrius continued operations during the following winter, attacking and seizing Roman allied cities and communities in southern Illyria. The Romans, who had hitherto ignored the activities of their former ally, decided that the harbors on the Ardiaean Kingdom's coast now had to be made secure, in view of the threat of another war with Carthage. These events precipitated the Second Illyrian War.

=== Surrender of Dimallum (219 BC) ===
Unlike Teuta in 229 BC, Demetrius was well prepared for the Roman invasion. He first placed a garrison in Dimallum, an Illyrian city-fortress from Apollonia. He eliminated his opponents in other places, those Illyrians who opposed his rule, and stationed 6,000 of his best forces on his home island of Pharos. As before, both consuls of the year accompanied the Roman expedition, but the leading role was played by Aemilius Paullus, who was to be killed in the great Roman disaster at Cannae three years later. The Adriatic took on particular importance in Rome's preparations for the Second Punic War from 218 to 201 BC. Anticipating a long and difficult war far away from Rome, the Roman Senate decided first to set matters right in Illyria.

In 219 BC, having decided that Dimallum was crucial to Demetrius' power in the region, the consul prepared to besiege the city, but was able to take it by direct assault within seven days. As a result, all the Illyrian towns and cities of the area submitted to Roman protection, each receiving the appropriate terms and conditions. Next, the Romans moved against Demetrius on the island of Pharos, who awaited the attack with good troops, ample provisions and war materials behind strong fortifications, that of the modern port city of Stari Grad. To avoid a long siege, Aemilius decided to risk another frontal attack. The Roman army moved from the mainland to a wooded area of the island. Meanwhile, the next day, a small force of ships was sent out to tempt Demetrius from behind his fortifications. Demetrius marched down to the harbor to oppose the Roman landing. The strategy worked, and when the main Roman army appeared from another direction on the island, the Illyrian army was forced to give battle, as they were cut off from their city. Attacked on two sides, and cut off from the protection of the city walls, the battle was lost. In 218 BC, the Illyrian forces soon surrendered, while Demetrius deserted the island and fled to Macedonia, making his way to the court of Philip V of Macedon, who was now the Macedonian king following the death of Antigonus.

=== Aftermath ===
The Romans destroyed the fortifications of Pharos and before the summer was over Aemilius was back in Rome receiving congratulations for a job well done. Any threat to Roman holdings in Illyria had been eliminated, all the gains of the First Illyrian War had been secured, and the old restrictions on movement imposed on Illyrian kings. Demetrius may have returned to the Ardiaeian State and have been attacked by another Roman force, although the regime of Pinnes, now confirmed as king, was left intact. Rome supported a small Ardiaeian State ruled by Pinnes and his successors. The Roman Republic called for the extradition of Demetrius, but Phillip refused. Pinnes was ordered to pay the arrears of tribute, reparations imposed after the war. The weak Ardiaeian state soon fell prey to Macedonia, while the partial destruction brought onto the scene the urban koina of the Parthini, Byllines, Amantini and others.

== Third Illyrian War ==
=== Relations with Rome ===
By 181 BC, the loyal Pleuratus III had been succeeded by his son Gentius. During his reign, relations with the Ardiaean State and Rome started to deteriorate. The coast and hinterland south of the Drin remained under Roman control since the First Illyrian War against Teuta. Gentius moved to increase Illyrian power over kindred peoples living to the north and west. Among the islands, the Greek city of Issa had retained some form of independence under Roman protection but Pharos remained an Illyrian possession. On the mainland, the Delmatae and the Daorsi were at one time subjects, but the former defected soon after the accession of Gentius. Illyrian strength lay in its navy and it was their interference with Adriatic shipping that once more aroused Roman interest in the area.

In 180 BC, a Roman praetor responsible for coastal protection arrived in Brundisium with some of Gentius's ships that were said to have been caught in the act of piracy. An embassy to Illyria failed to locate the king; but the praetor discovered that Romans were being held for ransom at Corcyra Nigra. No outcome of the affair is reported and it may well be that the Senate accepted a claim by Gentius' envoys that the charges were false. Ten years later, when Rome was gripped with war fever against Perseus of Macedon, Issa accused Gentius of plotting war with the king and so the Illyrian envoys were denied a hearing before the Senate. Instead, the Romans seized 54 Illyrian lembi at anchor in the harbor of Epidamnus. On the eve of war, a Roman senator was sent to Illyria to remind Gentius of his formal friendship with the Roman Republic.

=== Alliance with Dardania and Macedonia ===
In 169 BC, Gentius arranged the murder of his brother, Plator, because Plator's plan to marry Etuta, daughter of the Dardanian king, Monunius II of Dardania, would have made him too powerful. Gentius then married Plator's fiancée for himself, securing the alliance of the powerful Dardanian State.

Perseus of Macedon, having recaptured several Roman outposts in Roman occupied Illyria, controlled the route leading west to the Ardiaean State. At this point, Perseus sent his first embassy to Gentius, consisting of the Illyrian exile Pleuratus, for his command of the Illyrian language, and the Macedonians Adaeus and Beroea. They found Gentius at Lissus and informed him of Perseus' successes against the Romans and Dardanians and his recent victory against the Penestae. Gentius replied that he lacked not the will to fight the Romans, but only the money. No promises were made on this point either by this embassy or another sent from Stuberra shortly afterwards. Perseus continued his efforts to involve Gentius in the war—preferably, it was said, at no cost to his treasury. The Illyrian exile Pleuratus raised 1,000 infantry and 200 cavalry from the Penestae. The Roman invasion of Macedonia in 168 BC forced the king to promise a subsidy to Gentius, whose ships might be employed to attack the Romans. A sum of 300 talents was mentioned and Perseus sent his companion Pantauchus to make the arrangements. In the city of Meteon, hostages were agreed and Gentius accepted the oath of the king. He sent Olympio with a delegation to Perseus to collect the money, and the treaty was concluded with some ceremony at Dium on the Thermaic Gulf. A formal parade of the Macedonian cavalry was held, which may have impressed the Illyrians; the cavalry may have represented the Macedonians in the ratification of the treaty.

The 300 talents were counted out of the royal treasure at Pella and the Illyrians were permitted to mark it with their own stamp. An advance of this money was forwarded to Gentius; and when this was passed over by Pantauchus, the king was urged to commence hostilities against the Romans. When Gentius imprisoned two Roman envoys sent by Appius Claudius at Lychnidus, Perseus recalled the rest of the subsidy in the belief that Gentius was now his ally, come what may.

=== Anti-Roman policy ===
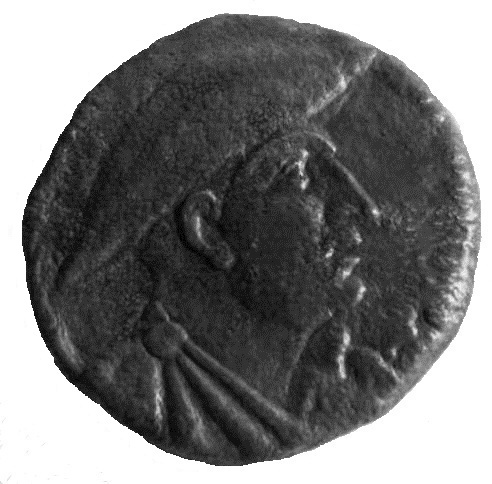
King Gentius of Illyria

Gentius accompanied the new anti-Roman orientation in Illyrian foreign policy with a series of measures to strengthen the Ardiaean State. First, he concentrated the finances by establishing a single tax over all the subjects and by taking royal control of the monetary workshops, or mints, of Lissus and Scodra, the two cities where he resided. At this time, Gentius was issuing bronze coins. In the Selcë hoard, there are two coins of Gentius with Macedonian emblems. The other coins of Gentius have what is probably his head with a cap not unlike the petasos, and a torc around his head, and on the reverse in one case a thunderbolt and in the other a lembus, the typical Illyrian warship. Thus, according to an inventory made by the Romans, the state treasury had 27 pounds of gold, 19 of silver, 120,000 Illyrian drachmas and 13,000 Roman denarii on the eve of the war with Rome.

Gentius and Perseus sent a joined embassy to invite Rhodes to join in the war against Rome. Gentius also built up a fleet of 270 lembi, a fact showing that the enemy he was prepared to face would come across the Adriatic. An army of 15,000 men completed the military machine of the Ardiaean State. Gentius was now prepared to go to war with Rome.

=== Destruction of the Illyrian kingdom (168 BC) ===
Having mustered his force of 15,000 men and his fleet of lembi at Lissus, the southernmost city of the State, Gentius advanced into Roman territory in January/February of 168 BC and laid siege to the Illyrian city of Bassania, a Roman ally that refused to yield, although it was only 5 miles from Lissus. His half-brother Caravantius detached 1,000 infantry and 50 horsemen and attacked the Cavii, failing to capture one of their cities while ravaging the fields of the city of Caravandis. A fleet of eight lembi set off a little later to attack the coastal colonial cities of Epidamnus and Apollonia. Meanwhile, the Romans under Appius Claudius had heard of the alliance that Gentius had made with Perseus of Macedon and the arrest of the Roman envoys. He therefore moved his army out of their winter quarters at Nymphaeum, added to it troops from Byllis, Epidamnus, and Apollonia, as he marched north, and encamped by the river Genesus. There, he met with the new Roman commander, Lucius Anicius Gallus, a praetor. Anicius had crossed over from Italy to Apollonia with two legions totalling 600 cavalry and 10,400 infantry and of Italian allies, 800 cavalry and 10,000 infantry. His fleet, the size of which is not known, was strengthened by a draft of 5,000 sailors. To this imposing force, he added 200 cavalry and 2,000 infantry of the Parthini, an Illyrian kingdom allied to the Romans. These combined forces outnumbered those of Gentius's by two to one.

As a folio of Livy's text is missing, little is known of this campaign. It seems that Anicius's fleets engaged Gentius' lembi and captured a number of them. Next, the Illyrian forces were defeated on land, allowing the Romans to advance to the heart of the state, where they won over the cities by humane and clement methods. Gentius concentrated his forces in his capital Shkodra, a well-fortified city in a strong natural position. When Anicius approached with his army in battle formation, Gentius fled into the city in panic. Gentius asked for, and was given, a three-day truce hoping that Caravantius would come at any moment with a large relieving army, but it did not happen. After his defeat, Gentius sent two prominent tribal leaders, Teuticus and Bellus, as envoys to negotiate with the Roman commander. On the third day of the truce, Gentius surrendered to the Romans, who gave him a dinner with full honours and then put him under arrest. The Illyrians in Shkodra surrendered and the Roman envoys were liberated. The Roman army marched north of Scutari Lake where, at Meteon, they captured Gentius' queen Etuta, his brother Caravantius, his sons Scerdilaides and Pleuratus along with leading Illyrians.

The fall of the Ardiaean State is transmitted by Livy in a ceremonial manner of the triumph of Anicius in Rome:

In a few days, both on land and sea did he defeat the brave Illyrian tribe, who had relied on their knowledge of their own territory and fortifications

This part of the campaign had only lasted 30 days. There were certainly further operations in the northern part of the Ardiaean State, for Anicius placed garrisons in some towns, citadels and fortresses. These include the cities of Issa, Rhizon and Olcinium and the tribal states of the Daorsi and the Pirustae. Some came over to Rome on their own accord, while other places, such as Pharos, were reduced by force and their property looted.

=== Aftermath ===
Rome's triumph included the capture of many royal flags, other booty, the furniture of the king himself and the treasure mentioned above. Millions of sestercii were gained from the sale of the booty, in addition to the gold and silver that went to the state treasury.

By decision of the Senate, Gentius and his family were sent to Spoletum, to be kept under observation. The other captives were imprisoned in Rome. But the inhabitants of Spoletum refused to keep the royal family under watch, so they were transferred to Iguvium. The booty seized in Illyria included 220 vessels. By decree of the Senate, C. Cassius Longinus gave these vessels taken from Gentius to the inhabitants of Corcyra, Apollonia and Epidamnus. The year of Gentius' death is not known, but there are ruins of what is perhaps his tomb.

The Roman punishment of Illyria spared only those kingdoms that had backed Rome openly in the war. For those who had been enemies, their cities, buildings and public institutions were burned and thoroughly looted. Those spared retained their previous manner of administration, with officials elected every year, and paid Rome only half the taxes that they had previously paid to Gentius. The federation-based kingdoms were dissolved and each unit was recognized as a separate kingdom, enjoying local autonomy and often the right to mint its own coins.

While the southern Illyrian lands had been subjected once and for all, the Roman legions continued for about another hundred years with attempts to conquer the northern and eastern territories.

== See also ==
- Italian invasion of Albania
- Illyrian warfare
- Pinnes (Ardiaean)
