= Phoenice =

Ancient city

- Φοινίκη (Greek)
- Phoenike
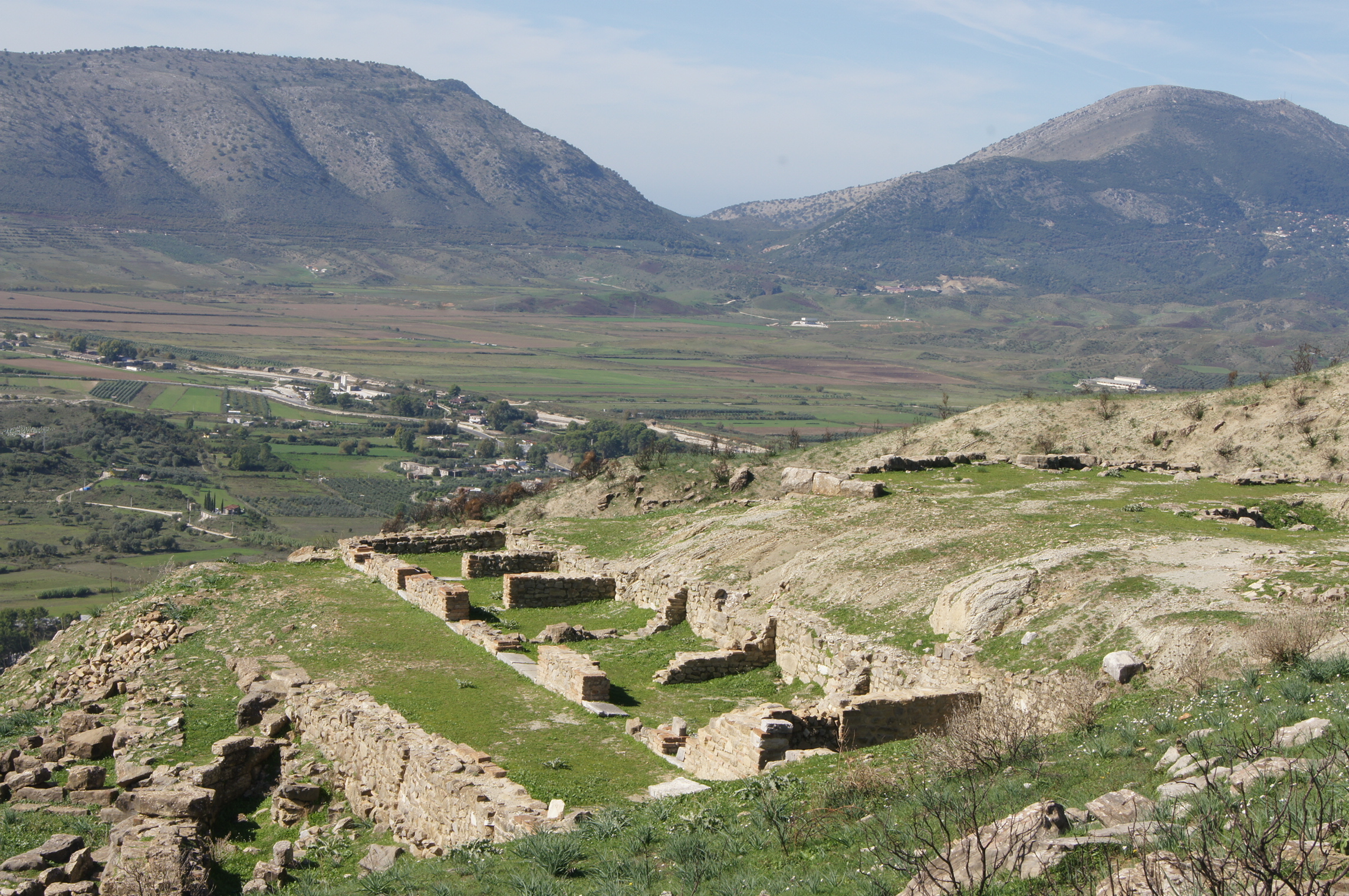
- 2nd c. BC shops

- Location within Albania
- 39°54′48″N 20°03′28″E
- Type: Settlement
- Cultures: Greek, Roman, Byzantine
- Location: Finiq, Vlorë County, Albania
- Region: Chaonia

History
- Built: Second half of the 5th century BC
- Built by: Chaonians
- Event: Treaty of Phoenice

Phoenice or Phoenike (Ancient Greek: Φοινίκη) was an ancient Greek city in Epirus and capital of the Chaonians. It is located high on an almost impregnable hill commanding the fertile valley below and near the modern town of the same name, Finiq, in southern Albania. It was the wealthiest city in Epirus and had the strongest walls until the Roman conquest. It was the location of the Treaty of Phoenice which ended the First Macedonian War. The city is part of an archaeological park.

== Toponym ==
The toponym is ultimately of non-Indo-European origin, as with all names with an -īk suffix in IE languages. There were at least 16 toponyms throughout the Ancient Greek world sharing the root Phoinik-; from Epirus to Lycia. In ancient Greek, φοῖνιξ (phoenix) may have acquired different meanings. They include "dark red or "brown-red", which could have referred to geographical features of particular rivers and mountains. As a name it may have referred to groups which entered the Aegean sea via the southern Anatolian coastline.

== History ==
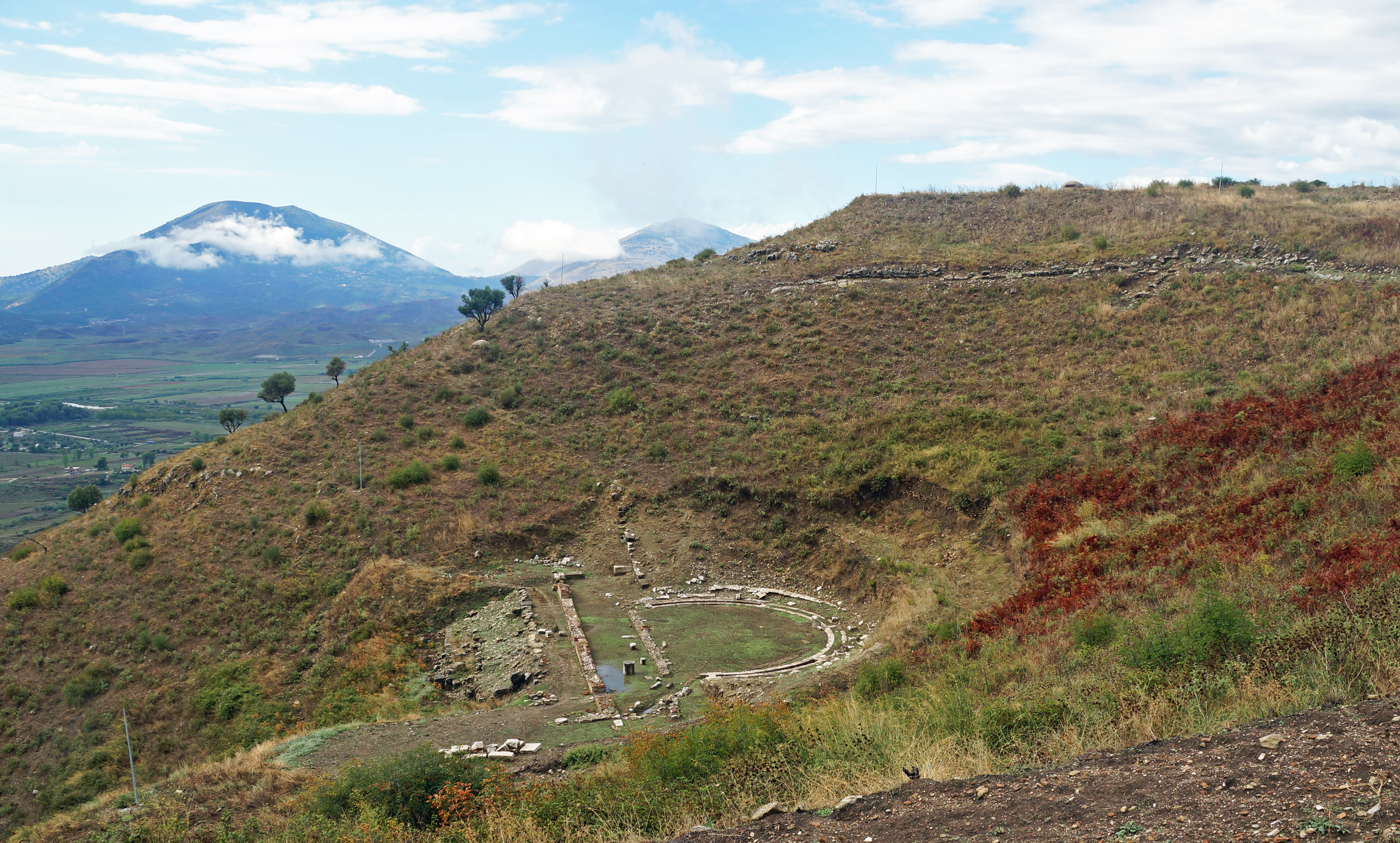
Theatre

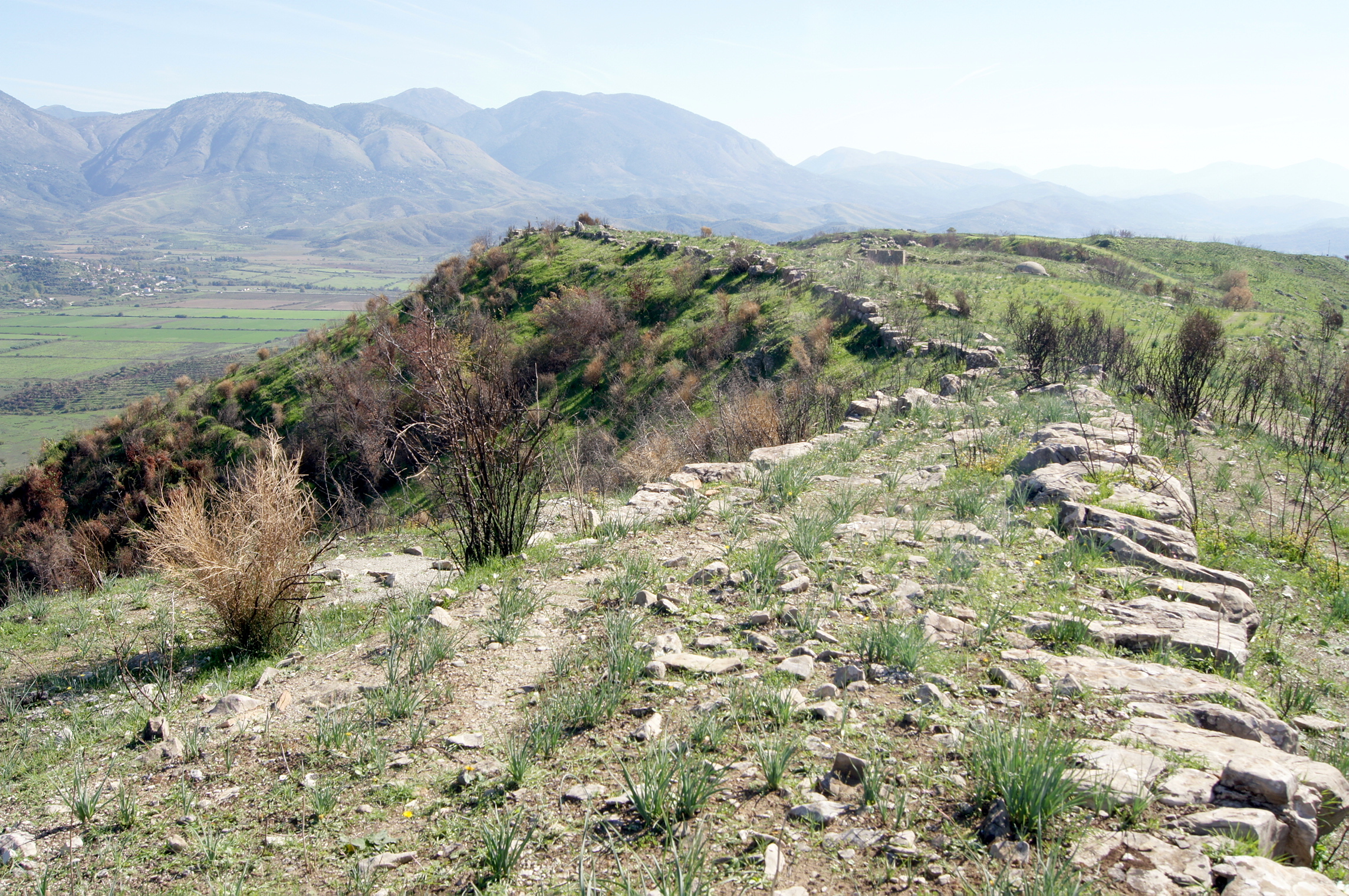
Phoenice city walls

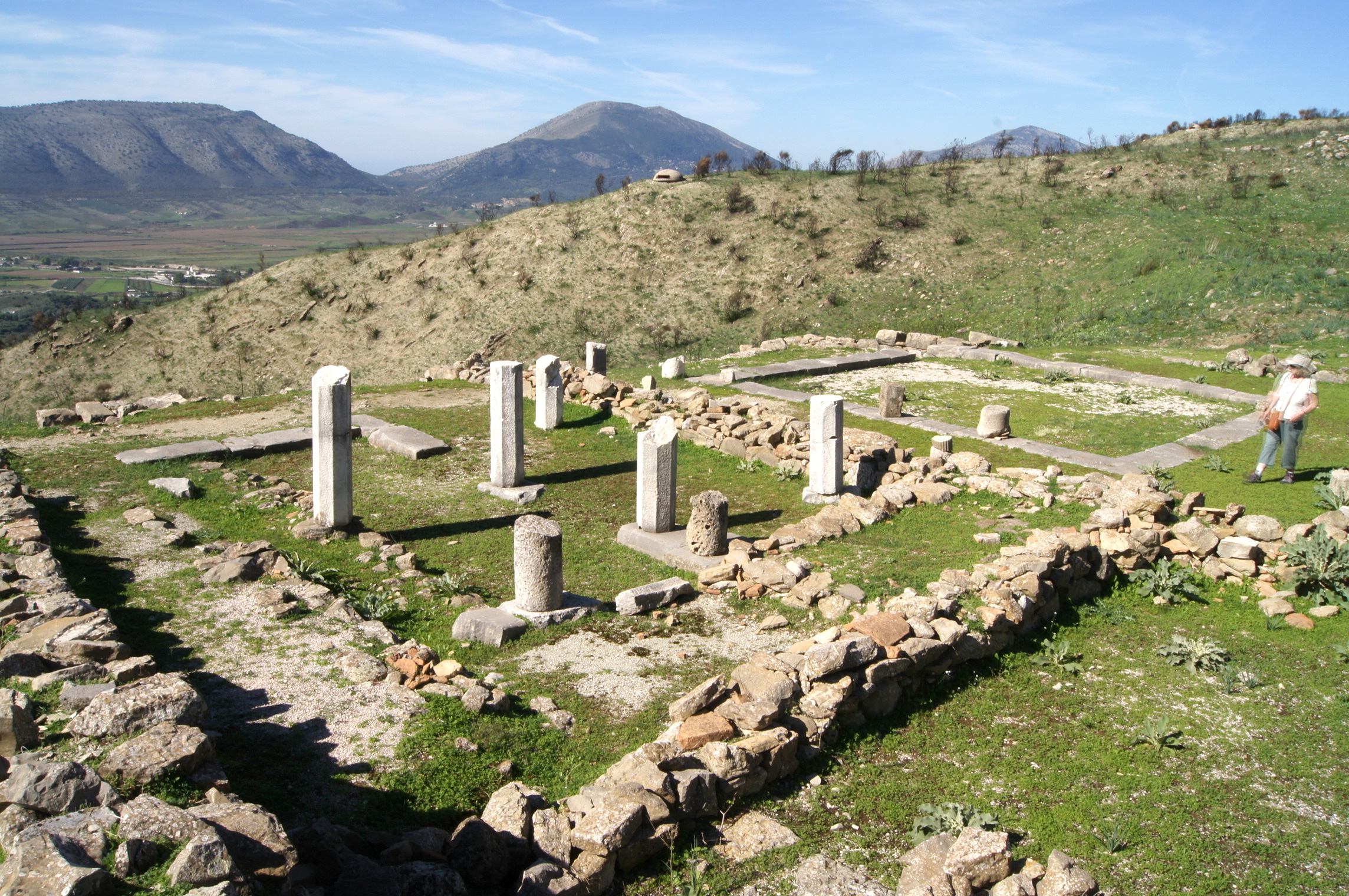
House with two peristyles

=== Antiquity ===
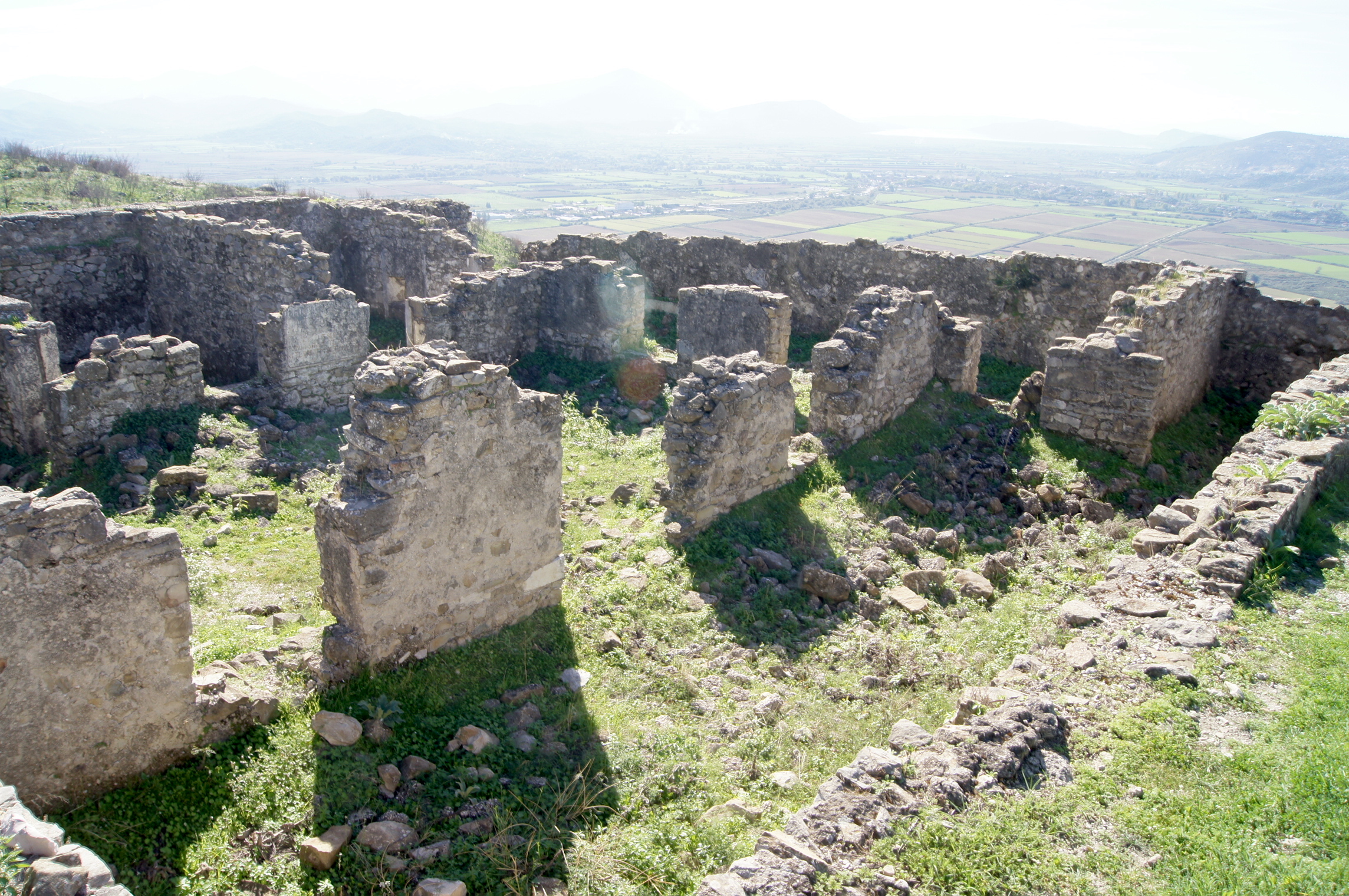
Roman cistern

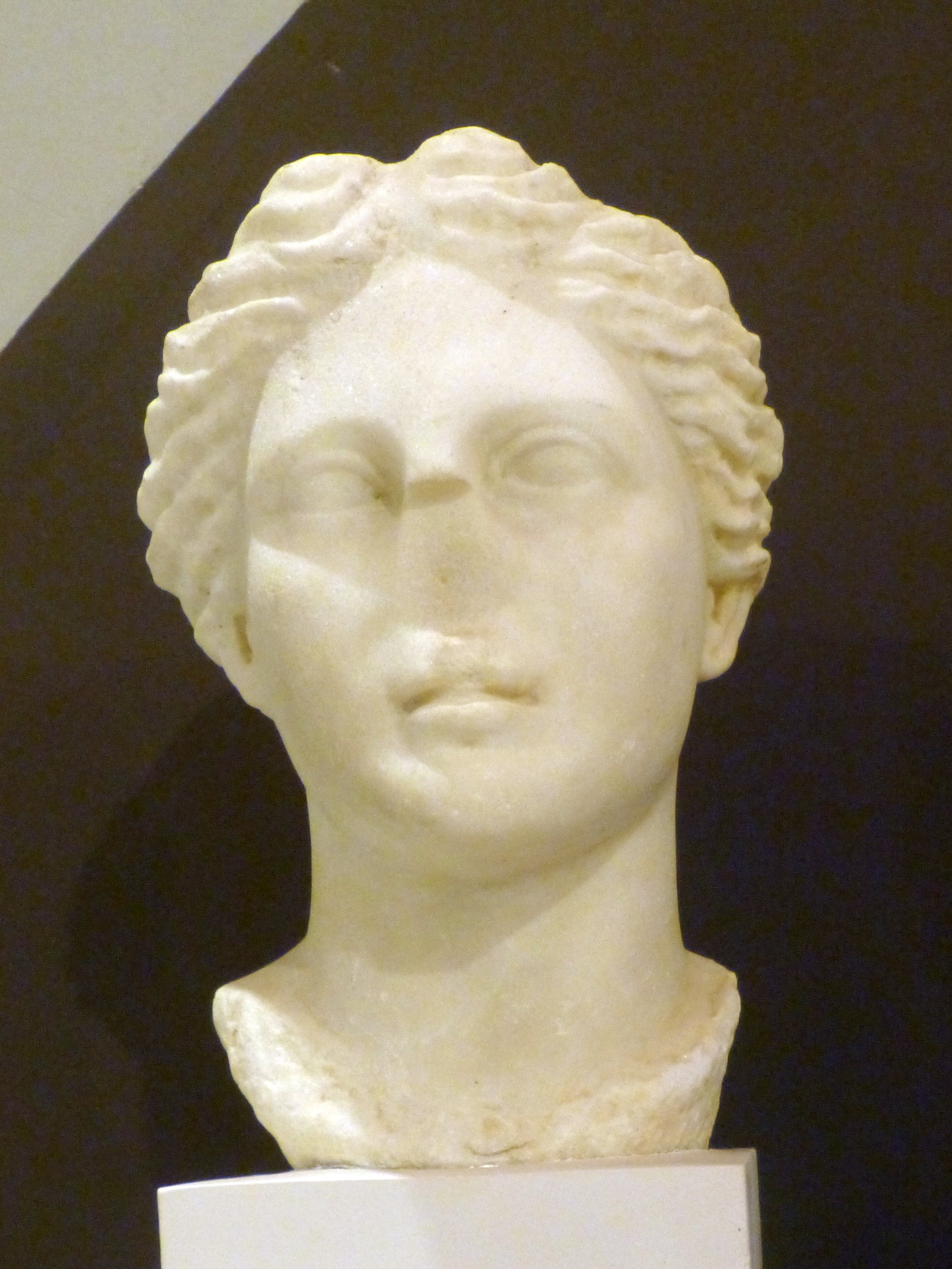
Aprodite from Phoenice (Butrint Museum)

The city was the political centre of the Chaonians, one of the three major Greek tribes in ancient Epirus.

From the second half of the 5th century BC, a number of public buildings were erected on the acropolis, while at the end of the next century the city walls were expanded as part of the defensive strategy of Pyrrhus, leader of united Epirus. The earliest phase of Phoenice's walls consisted of massive blocks up to 3.6 metres thick, the Chaonians' primary concern being to defend the city against Corcyraeans or Illyrian raiders. In the 3rd century BC the urban area was extended on the centre and west sides of the hill.

The patron god of the city was probably Athena Polias.

In circa 233 BC, Queen Deidamia II, the last member of the Aeacid ruling dynasty, was assassinated, the monarchy was abolished in Epirus, and the city became the centre of the federal government of the Epirote League.

In 231 BC, an Illyrian army of Queen Teuta, returning north from a raid in the Peloponnese, captured Phoenice after the town was surrendered by the 800 Gaulish mercenary garrison. An army was sent by the Epirote League to relieve the town but were defeated at the Battle of Phoenice.

The Illyrians were forced to withdraw their troops to deal with an internal rebellion. A truce was thus reached, and Phoenice and the Illyrians' free-born captives were returned to the Epirotes for a ransom. During their occupation of Phoenice, the Illyrians murdered several Roman merchants in the town, which would eventually lead to the First Illyrian War.

In 205 BC, a peace treaty was signed there between the Kingdom of Macedon and the Roman Republic that ended the First Macedonian War. During the Third Macedonian War (171 BC–168 BC), Epirus was split into two states with the Molossians siding with the Macedonians and the Chaonians and Thesprotians siding with Rome. The latter were centred in Phoenice under the leadership of Charops.

After the Roman conquest (167 BC), the region of Epirus was devastated, except for the pro-Roman cities in Chaonia; including Phoenice, which had limited Roman occupation at first. The Romans later renovated the city, amongst the buildings of which the great cistern dates from the 2nd c. AD.

=== Medieval period ===
In the early Byzantine era, Emperor Justinian I (r. 527–565) constructed fortifications on a hill adjacent to Phoenice. During the 5th and 6th centuries, the city was listed as a see of a bishopric and hosted a number of religious buildings including a baptistery and a basilica, which were influenced by the architectural style of the great basilicas of Nikopolis. Phoenice was one of the main settlements in Epirus Vetus together with Nicopolis, Dodona, Euroia, Andrianoupolis, Anhiasmos, Vouthroton, Photike, Corfu and Ithaka. However, the city vanished after the 6th century and the urban center of the area moved to nearby Mesopotamon.

== The Site ==
In the mid-3rd century BC among the public buildings a temple was built, called the thesauròs by Luigi M. Ugolini.

The large theatre had a scenae frons 30m wide. It was built in the 3rd c. BC and renovated in the 2nd. It was rebuilt in the 2nd c. AD under the Romans.

== Excavations ==
Formal excavations in the area started in 1924 by an Italian Archaeological Mission as a political tool for Mussolini's nationalistic ambitions to the east of the Adriatic. During 1924–1928, French and Italian archaeologists found a few artifacts in Phoenice. In fact, the Italian mission headed by the fascist prehistorian, Luigi Ugolini, hoped that the prehistoric graves that would be discovered could be attributed to the Illyrians in order to exploit Albanian nationalist sentiment, but the finds themselves were hardly stunning. Ugolini also stated that materials found there were related to the Iron Age culture of southern Italy. Ugolini's thesis was later politically exploited by the totalitarian regime of Fascist Italy.

After 1928, excavations moved to the nearby archaeological sites of Kalivo and Çuka e Aitoit (or Mount Eagle) and continued until 1943. After the war, excavations resumed in 1958 by a joint Albanian-USSR archaeological team, which included a thorough topographic survey and mapping. After 1961, when a political rift occurred between Albania and the USSR, excavations continued under Albanian authorities. A complete report of these excavations has not been published. Some parts of the work were published by Albanian archaeologists Bace and Bushati in 1989, reporting Hellenistic domiciles, Roman houses, and other finds dating from the 4th century BC to the 4th century AD. The authors identified three distinct structures, it has been suggested by them that this whole complex comprised a Prytaneion, serving visitors to the town, outside the principal enceinte. Those Albanian archaeologists found also the opportunity to strengthen the nationalistic paradigm of Illyrian-Albanian continuity by reporting similarities of these houses and the medieval Albanian ones. They also found an "egalitarian" nature among the excavated dwellings, in line with the philosophy of communist "self-reliance" promoted by the Albanian state during that period.

Significant recent excavations took place in two stages between 1980 and 1981, and between 1989 and 1991. On the first occasion the theatre was found. At the same time, research continued in the southern necropolis with the discovery of other Hellenistic tombs among which one with rich grave goods, probably from the end of the 4th century BC. These excavations also involved sections of the city walls in the south-west sector and above all the central area of the plateau. The excavations of 1989–1991 are better documented at the Albanian Archaeological Institute in Tirana and included the "House of the two peristyles". Excavations have resumed since 2000.

== 2012 looting incident ==
In June 2012, looters broke into a Hellenistic-era tomb located on the road that connected Phoenice to its hinterland. The looters reportedly used heavy construction equipment to dig a trench several metres deep through the hillside, scattering the stones of the tomb in the process.

== See also ==
- List of cities in ancient Epirus
