= Limnaea (Acarnania) =

Ancient city of Acarnania, Greece

Coordinates: 38°51′49″N 21°10′01″E

Limnaea or Limnaia (Ancient Greek: Λιμναία) was a city in ancient Acarnania at the southeast corner of the Ambraciot Gulf, on the very frontier of Acarnania towards Aetolia. It site is near the modern town of Amphilochia. Thucydides said that Limnaea lay on the road from Ambracia and Argos Amphilochicum to Stratos. Philip III of Macedon disembarked at Limnaea, when about to invade Aetolia.

The site of Limnaea is at a site called Karavassaras, within the bounds of the town of Amphilochia. The fortified hill commands the strategic passage that connects Ambracia and Epirus to ancient Stratos, Agrinion and the rest of Aetolia and Acarnania. The site today is largely abandoned and open for visits through a rough, and very precarious, concrete road. The ancient wall is visible all around the small church atop the hill in scattered ruins.
