= Epirote League =

Ancient Greek coalition

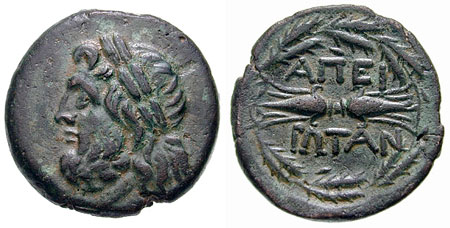
Coin of the Epirote League, depicting Zeus (left) and a lighting with the word "ΑΠΕΙΡΩΤΑΝ" – Epirotes (right)

The Epirote League (Epirote: Κοινὸν Ἀπειρωτᾶν, Koinòn Āpeirōtân; Attic: Κοινὸν Ἠπειρωτῶν, Koinòn Ēpeirōtôn) was an ancient Greek coalition, or koinon, of Epirote tribes.

== History ==
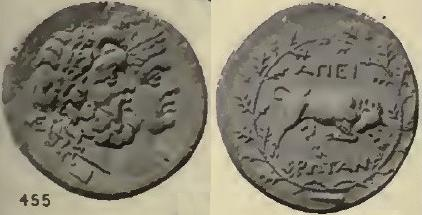
Depicting Dioni and Zeus (left) and a bull (right)

The coalition was established between 370 and 320 BC (firstly as the Molossian League in 370 BC), which helped unify the three main Greek tribes of Epirus (i.e., Molossians, Thesprotians, and Chaonians). The oracle of Dodona was the religious, political and cultural centre of the Molossian League and later of the Epirote League. In 297 BC, Pyrrhus of Epirus became leader of the League. When King Agathocles of Syracuse conquered Corcyra, he offered the island as dowry to his daughter Lanassa on her marriage to Pyrrhus of Epirus in 295 BC. The island then became a member of the Epirote League. It was then perhaps that the settlement of Cassope was founded to serve as a base for the king of Epirus' expeditions. The island remained in the Epirote League until 255 BC when it became independent after the death of Alexander II of Epirus. The league was defeated by the Illyrians during the Battle of Phoenice, which forced it to enter into an alliance with Teuta to prevent further attacks. This alliance made the Epirotes hostile to the Achaeans and Aetolians, but it presumably ended following the Illyrian defeat in the First Illyrian War.

Although the Epirote League remained neutral in the first two Macedonian Wars, it was ultimately dismantled in the Third Macedonian War (171–168 BC), with the Molossians siding with the Macedonians and the Chaonians and Thesprotians supporting the Roman Republic.

== Decrees of the League ==
Copies of the decrees (proxeny and citizenship decrees, manumission records) of the Molossian and Epirote League were set up in Dodona. All members had common citizenship. Regarding the dialect of the Epirote League, it was not Corinthian Doric and even the alphabet was not Corinthian; it was probably Northwest Doric, as some recorded inquiries at Dodona appear to indicate. The first epigraphical evidence of the Molossian League goes back to 370 BC under the king (or basileus) Neoptolemus.

== See also ==
- Epirus (ancient state)
