= Treaty of Phoenice =

205 BC peace treaty ending the First Macedonian War

The Treaty of Phoenice, also known as the Peace of Phoenice, was a treaty ending the First Macedonian War. It was drawn up at Phoenice in 205 BC.

The Greek political balance between Macedon under Philip V and the Aetolian League was upset by the war between Rome and Carthage. Philip, seeking to enhance his position, raised a fleet and sent emissaries to Hannibal, then occupying part of Italy. Fearing that Philip could offer overt military assistance, Rome hoped to confine the Macedonians to the east of the Roman province of Illyria. Between 214 and 212 BC, Philip made two unsuccessful attempts to invade Illyria by sea and halting progress by ground, eventually succeeding in capturing the port of Lissus and gaining the province's capitulation.

At this point, Rome was able to spur the Aetolians into an alliance against Philip. For two years the allies warred with Macedonia, achieving minor military victories, and politically gaining more allies from among the Greek city-states. When the Romans retired from the field, Philip's forces advanced against the Aetolians, turning the fortunes of the war. In the end, the Macedonians largely regained their original position, and the Romans and Aetolians were ready to make peace.

The treaty formally acknowledged the favorable position of Macedonia, including the capture of Illyria, but Philip effectively repudiated his alliance with Hannibal. The conditions allowed that Rome would control the Parthinians, Dimallum, Bargulum, and Eugenium, and Macedonia, pending approval of the Senate of Rome, would control Atintania. Other parties to the treaty included Prusias of Bithynia, the Achaeans, the Boeotians, the Thessalians, the Acarnanians, and the Epirots, on the side of Philip, and the Ilians, Attalus, Pleuratus, Nabis of the Lacedaemonians, the Eleans, the Messenians, and Athenians, on the side of Rome.

== See also ==
- List of treaties
