= Medeon (Acarnania) =

- Μεδεών (Greek)
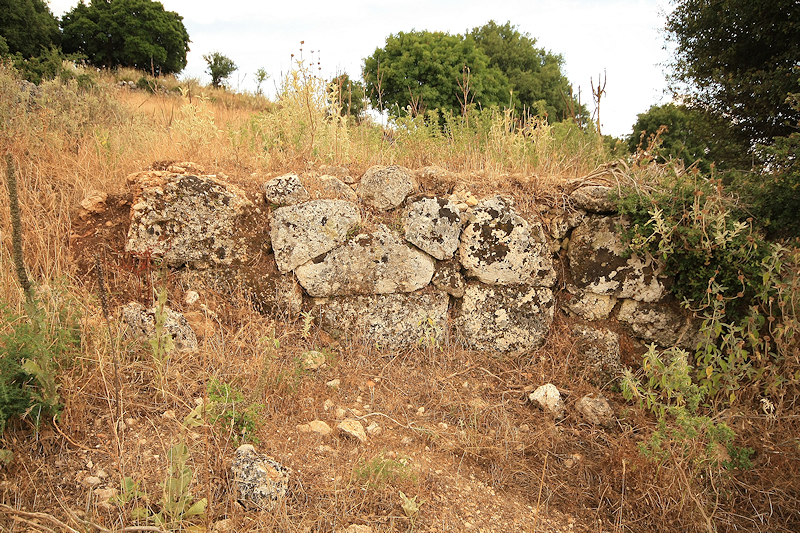
- Part of the ancient walls of Medeon

- Location within Greece
- 38°46′55″N 21°07′44″E
- Type: Ancient city

Site notes
- Condition: Ruined-unexcavated

Medeon (Ancient Greek: Μεδεών) or Medion (Μεδίων) was a town in the interior of ancient Acarnania, on the road from Stratus and Phytia (or Phoeteiae) to Limnaea on the Ambraciot Gulf. Thucydides mentions that it was crossed by the Spartan army during the Peloponnesian War, under the command of Eurylochus, between Phytia and Limnaea, on its march to Battle of Olpae in 426 BCE. It was one of the few towns in the interior of the country which maintained its independence against the Aetolians after the death of Alexander the Great. At length, in 231 BCE, the Aetolians laid siege to Medeon with a large force, and had reduced it to great distress, when they were attacked by a body of Illyrian mercenaries, who had been sent by sea by Demetrius, king of Macedonia, in order to relieve the place. The Aetolians were defeated, and obliged to retreat with the loss of their camp, arms, and baggage. Medeon is again mentioned in 191 BCE, as one of the Acarnanian towns, of which Antiochus, king of Syria, obtained possession in that year.

The site of Medeon is near the modern village of Katouna.
