= Baldushk =

- Administrative unit
- Location within Albania
- Coordinates: 41°13′N 19°48′E
- Country: Albania
- County: Tirana
- Municipality: Tirana
  - Administrative unit: 116.10 km^{2} (44.83 sq mi)

Population (2023)
  - Administrative unit: 3,879
  - Administrative unit density: 33.41/km^{2} (86.53/sq mi)
- Time zone: UTC+1 (CET)
  - Summer (DST): UTC+2 (CEST)
- Postal Code: 1035
- Area Code: (0)49

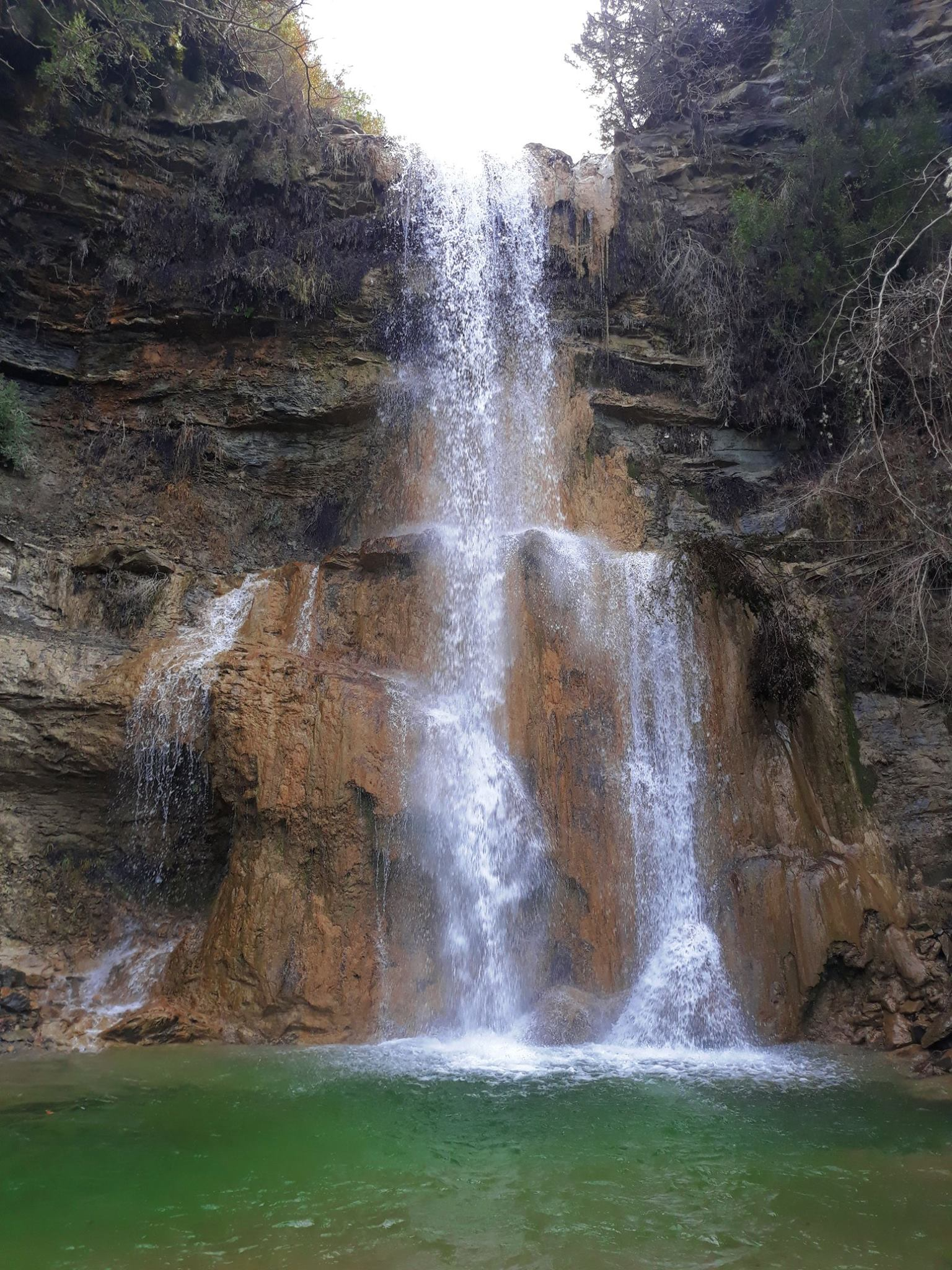
Waterfall in Kakunj

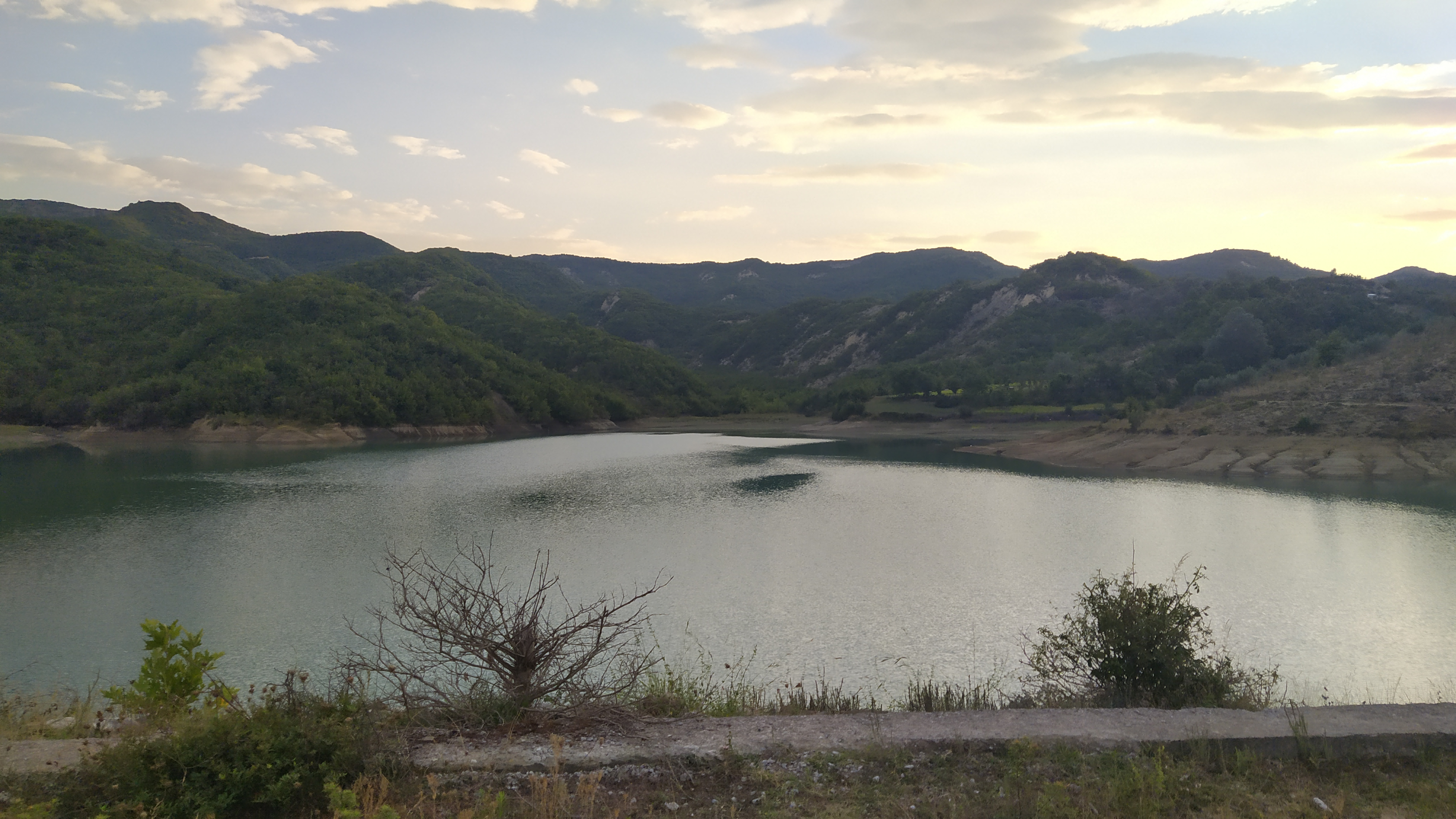
Liqeni i Hykajve në Baldushk

Baldushk is a village and municipal unit in Tirana County, central Albania. At the 2015 local government reform, it became a municipal unit of the municipality Tirana. The population as of the 2023 census is 3,879.

Historical population
Year	Pop.	±%
1989	6,030	—
2001	5,526	−8.4%
2011	4,576	−17.2%
2023	3,879	−15.2%

It is located 15 km south-west of the city of Tirana. Baldushk Administrative Unit is bordered to the north by the villages of Vishaj and Arbanë of the Vaqarr Administrative Unit, to the east by the village of Lugë-Shalqizë of the Bërzhitė Administrative Unit and the villages of Durisht and Petrelë of the Petrelë Administrative Unit, to the south by the village of Pajovë of the Pajovë Administrative Unit of Peqin District, and to the west by the villages of Çaush, Dorëz, Grecë and Gror of the Peze Administrative Unit and the District of Kavaja.

The territory of Baldushk is located in a valley crossed by the river Zhullima and consists of plains, small to medium hills, slopes and valleys. This territory is covered with scrub forests of mare, juniper, gorse, heather, oak, ash, etc. The forests of the municipality are natural, except for an area of about 770 ha with Mediterranean pine planted with seedlings many years ago. There are also many unproductive, unproductive areas in the territory of the municipality. Baldushku has 14 villages, which are inhabited by 5267 inhabitants. The settlements are mainly concentrated in small neighbourhoods at the foot of the hills and are connected between them by cross roads. The houses are mainly new constructions of 1-2 floors. The agricultural production of the area is based on the organic production of vegetables, cultured fruit, trees, olive groves of 25 thousand roots. The area is also known for raising poultry (turkeys), the tradition of the area. In terms of tourism, the picturesque villages of Mumajes Kodër and Shpat are located on the territory of the municipality, where there is the historical tap of Mamica and a 30m deep cave. In the village of Kakunjë there is the old church of Saint Mary.

== Villages ==
The administrative unit Baldushk consists of 14 villages:

- Baldushk
- Balshaban
- Fushas
- Isufmuçaj
- Kakunj
- Koçaj
- Mumajes
- Mustafakoçaj
- Parret
- Shënkoll
- Shpatë
- Shpat i Sipërm
- Vesqi
- Vrap
- Tavarej

The administrative unit of Baldushk has a total of 5267 inhabitants (the data is from 2008). Baldushku has a population of 5267 inhabitants distributed among 14 villages. The major villages in the commune based on the density are Fushas with 699 inhabitants and then followed by Mustafakoçaj, Baldushk, Isufmuçaj, Veski, Vrap and Kakunjë. Baldushk was also settled by people coming from the north-western area of Albania, established mainly in Fushas. The other villages constitute 37% of the population. The village with the smallest number of population is Shënkollë with 165 inhabitants. The villages of the commune are divided in neighbourhoods and every village has over 3 of them. The villages with most neighbourhoods are Baldushk, Mustafakoçaj, Vrap and Fushas. There are overall 75 clans, among which Tresa, Shabani, Vrapi, Allmuça, Ibraliu, Zela, Kodra, Selimja, Kasa, Meta, Kacollaj, Harizi etc.

The data of the civil status office of the municipality prove of a decrease in the number of the population for the time period 2005 - 2008. From 6392 to 5267 inhabitants and from 1147 to 1028 families. Population departures have occurred especially in deep hilly villages such as Vrap, Shënkoll, Parret and Shpat. In these villages the terrain is broken.
