= Koçaj-Sheshaj =

- Village
- Location within Albania
- Coordinates: 41°6′31″N 19°42′20″E
- Country: Albania
- County: Tirana
- Municipality: Rrogozhinë
- Administrative unit: Sinaballaj
- Time zone: UTC+1 (CET)
  - Summer (DST): UTC+2 (CEST)
- Postal Code: 2511
- Area Code: 055

Koçaj-Sheshaj is a village situated in the central plains of Albania's Western Lowlands region. It is part of Tirana County. Following the 2015 local government reform, it became part of the municipality Rrogozhinë.
