= Façesh =

- Village
- Location within Albania
- Coordinates: 41°20′N 20°3′E
- Country: Albania
- County: Tirana
- Municipality: Tirana
- Administrative unit: Shëngjergj
- Time zone: UTC+1 (CET)
  - Summer (DST): UTC+2 (CEST)

Façesh is a village in the former municipality of Shëngjergj in Tirana County, Albania. At the 2015 local government reform it became part of the municipality Tirana.

== Demographic history ==
Façesh (Fevaçish) appears in the Ottoman defter of 1467 as a village belonging to the region of Tamadhea in the vilayet of Çermeniça. The village had a total of four households which were represented by the following household heads: Ilia Dofri, Petër Kalluri, Petër Shirgji, Mathe Gjiraku.
