= Shënkoll (disambiguation) =

Shënkoll may refer to:

- Shënkoll, a village in the Lezhë municipality, Albania
- Shënkoll, Baldushk, a village in the administrative unit of Baldushk, Tirana municipality, Albania
- Shënkoll, Petrelë, a village in the administrative unit of Petrelë, Tirana municipality, Albania
- several churches dedicated to Saint Nicholas in Albania, see St. Nicholas Church#Albania
