= Rifat Hoxha =

Albanian author and historian (born 1964)

- Born: Refat Hoxha; 15 July 1964 (age 61); Domën, Tirana County
- Education: University of Tirana
- Occupations: Historian, writer

Rifat Hoxha (born 15 July 1946) is an Albanian author and historian. He was born in the village of Domën, just outside Kavajë, in the present-day municipality of Rrogozhinë. After completing high school studies in his hometown, Rifat enrolled at Tirana's Faculty of Philology where he graduated with a degree in languages and literature. He has participated actively in the literary life of Kavajë by publishing numerous books of historical character.

== Works ==
Historical publications

- Kavaja në Shekuj I (1595–1944)
- Kavaja në Shekuj II (1945–1990)
- Instituti Shqiptaro-Amerikan i Kavajës (1925–1939)
- Kavaja në Luftën për Pavarësi
- Kavaja Arkeologjike
- Legjenda të Vendlindjes
- Kavaja në vitet 1945–1990
- Kavaja kur nuk ishte dhe si u bë
- Kavaja në Lidhjen Shqiptare të Prizrenit (1878–1881)
- Histori e Islamit në Kavajë

Novels

- Kalorësit e këngës
- E fshehta e Kullës së Sahatit
- I vdekuri që varri nuk e mban...
- Rruga e Madhe
- Jeta e fshehtë pas martese...
- Aktorja që nuk u thinj
- Princesha e Irminit
- Fytyra e heshtjes
- E fshehta e Kullës së Sahatit II

Monographs

- Korbi dhe Migjeni
- Peshkopi i Arbërisë
- Kadareja, Nobeli dhe letërsia e braktisur
- Haxhi Xhaferr Shkodra
- Shyqyri Mahmudaj

Essays

- Legjenda të vendlindjes
- Kënga popullore e Kavajës
