= Zambish =

- Village
- Location within Albania
- Coordinates: 41°8′9″N 19°39′3″E
- Country: Albania
- County: Tirana
- Municipality: Rrogozhinë
- Administrative unit: Lekaj

Population
  - Total: 200
- Time zone: UTC+1 (CET)
  - Summer (DST): UTC+2 (CEST)
- Postal Code: 2507
- Area Code: 055

Zambish is a village situated in the central plains of Albania's Western Lowlands region. It is part of Tirana County. At the 2015 local government reform it became part of the municipality Rrogozhinë.

This is a village with nearly 200 people, it was more populated during 1991 years, but a lot of people decided to move.
