= Kalush =

Kalush may refer to:

- Kalush, Afghanistan
- Kalush, Albania
- Kalush Raion, a district of Ukraine
  - Kalush, Ukraine, seat of Kalush Raion
- WFC Naftokhimik Kalush, a women's professional football club based in Kalush, Ukraine
- Kalush (rap group), a musical rap group from Kalush, Ukraine, founded in 2019
- Kalush Orchestra, a Ukrainian folk-rap group, founded in 2021, winner of Eurovision 2022.
