= Domën =

- Village
- Location within Albania
- Coordinates: 41°7′38″N 19°28′32″E
- Country: Albania
- County: Tirana
- Municipality: Rrogozhinë
- Administrative unit: Kryevidh
- Time zone: UTC+1 (CET)
  - Summer (DST): UTC+2 (CEST)
- Postal Code: 2510
- Area Code: (0)55

Domën is a village situated in the central plains of Albania's Western Lowlands region. It is part of Tirana County. At the 2015 local government reform it became part of the municipality Rrogozhinë.

== Notable people ==
Rifat Hoxha
