= Memollaj =

- Village
- Location within Albania
- Coordinates: 41°6′2″N 19°40′52″E
- Country: Albania
- County: Tirana
- Municipality: Rrogozhinë
- Administrative unit: Sinaballaj
- Time zone: UTC+1 (CET)
  - Summer (DST): UTC+2 (CEST)
- Area Code: (0)55

Memollaj is a village situated in the central plains of Albania's Western Lowlands region. It is part of Tirana County.
