= Kërçukaj =

- Village
- Location within Albania
- Coordinates: 41°06′07″N 19°36′36″E
- Country: Albania
- County: Tirana
- Municipality: Rrogozhinë
- Administrative unit: Gosë
- Time zone: UTC+1 (CET)
  - Summer (DST): UTC+2 (CEST)
- Postal Code: 2508
- Area Code: (0)55

Kërçukaj is a village situated in the central plains of Albania's Western Lowlands region. It is part of Tirana County. At the 2015 local government reform it became part of the municipality Rrogozhinë.

== Nearby Places ==
Tirana International Airport Mother Teresa is located in a distance of 23 mi(or 36 km) which is one of the larger airports nearby. The closest heritage site is Natural and Cultural Heritage of the Orhid region at 62 mi. Historic Centres of Berat and Gjirokastra, Butrint, and Old Town of Corfu are also the places to visit nearby.
