= Kazie =

- Village
- Location within Albania
- Coordinates: 41°7′9″N 19°29′24″E
- Country: Albania
- County: Tirana
- Municipality: Rrogozhinë
- Administrative unit: Kryevidh
- Time zone: UTC+1 (CET)
  - Summer (DST): UTC+2 (CEST)
- Postal Code: 2510
- Area Code: (0)55

Kazie is a coastal village situated in the central plains of Albania's Western Lowlands region. It is part of Tirana County. At the 2015 local government reform it became part of the municipality Rrogozhinë. Currently only one family lives in the village as everyone has left due to socioeconomic factors to find a better situation and life. The infrastructure is poor, making it one of the most empty settlements in Albania.
