= Çerkezë-Morinë =

- Village
- Location within Albania
- Coordinates: 41°24′N 19°47′E
- Country: Albania
- County: Tirana
- Municipality: Tirana
- Administrative unit: Zall-Herr
- Time zone: UTC+1 (CET)
  - Summer (DST): UTC+2 (CEST)

Çerkezë-Morinë is a village in the former municipality of Zall-Herr in Tirana County, Albania. At the 2015 local government reform it became part of the municipality of Tirana. The name of the village comes from the Albanian word for Circassians “Çerkezë”, meaning it was settled once by this population, during the aftermath of the expulsion of Circassians. Morina is an Albanian tribe who may have settled here previously before the arrival of the Circassians and may have founded the village, hence why both names are used for the village.
