= Gërmej =

- Village
- Location within Albania
- Coordinates: 41°8′27″N 19°37′53″E
- Country: Albania
- County: Tirana
- Municipality: Rrogozhinë
- Administrative unit: Lekaj
- Time zone: UTC+1 (CET)
  - Summer (DST): UTC+2 (CEST)
- Postal Code: 2507
- Area Code: 055

Gërmej, also known as German, is a village situated in the central plains of Albania's Western Lowlands region. It is part of Tirana County. At the 2015 local government reform it became part of the municipality Rrogozhinë.

== Geography ==
Gërmej is located in Western Albania, east of the SH4, 8 kilometers away from Rrogozhinë, while Tirana, the capital, is located around 27 kilometers away. The Adriatic Sea is located 13-16 kilometers away.
