= Combat Support Regiment =

Combat Support Regiment (Albania) Regjimenti i Mbështetjes me Luftim
- Active: 2014–present
- Country: Albania
- Branch: Albanian Land Force
- Role: Artillery; Air Defence; CBRN defence Explosive Ordnance Disposal; Military reserve force
- Size: Regiment
- Garrison/HQ: Zall-Herr, Tirana
- Engagements: Resolute Support Mission

Commanders
- Current commander: Colonel Ekland Dauti

The Combat Support Regiment (Albanian: Regjimenti i Mbështetjes me Luftim, commonly known as RML) is a supporting regiment of the Albanian Land Force, which has as its primary mission to create separate military capabilities with a specific mission and tasks for fire support, air defense, engineering operations, protecting armed forces maneuver units and population from weapons of mass destruction.

== History ==
The Combat Support Regiment was created on October 1, 2014, initially as a battalion and then as a regiment as a result of the restructuring of the Armed Forces and as a necessity of the mission of the Albanian Land Forces. In 2019, a platoon of RML was deployed in Afghanistan as part of Resolute Support Mission.The platoon of the Combat Support Battalion was the VII Albanian Contingent in the Resolute Support mission and served in Kabul.

== Structure ==
  - Ground Artillery Battalion
  - Air Defense Artillery Battery
  - Center for Defense Against Weapons of Mass Destruction
  - Company of Explosive Ordnance Disposal Engineers
  - Reserve Company
