= Zija Dibra =

Ottoman and later Albanian officer and politician

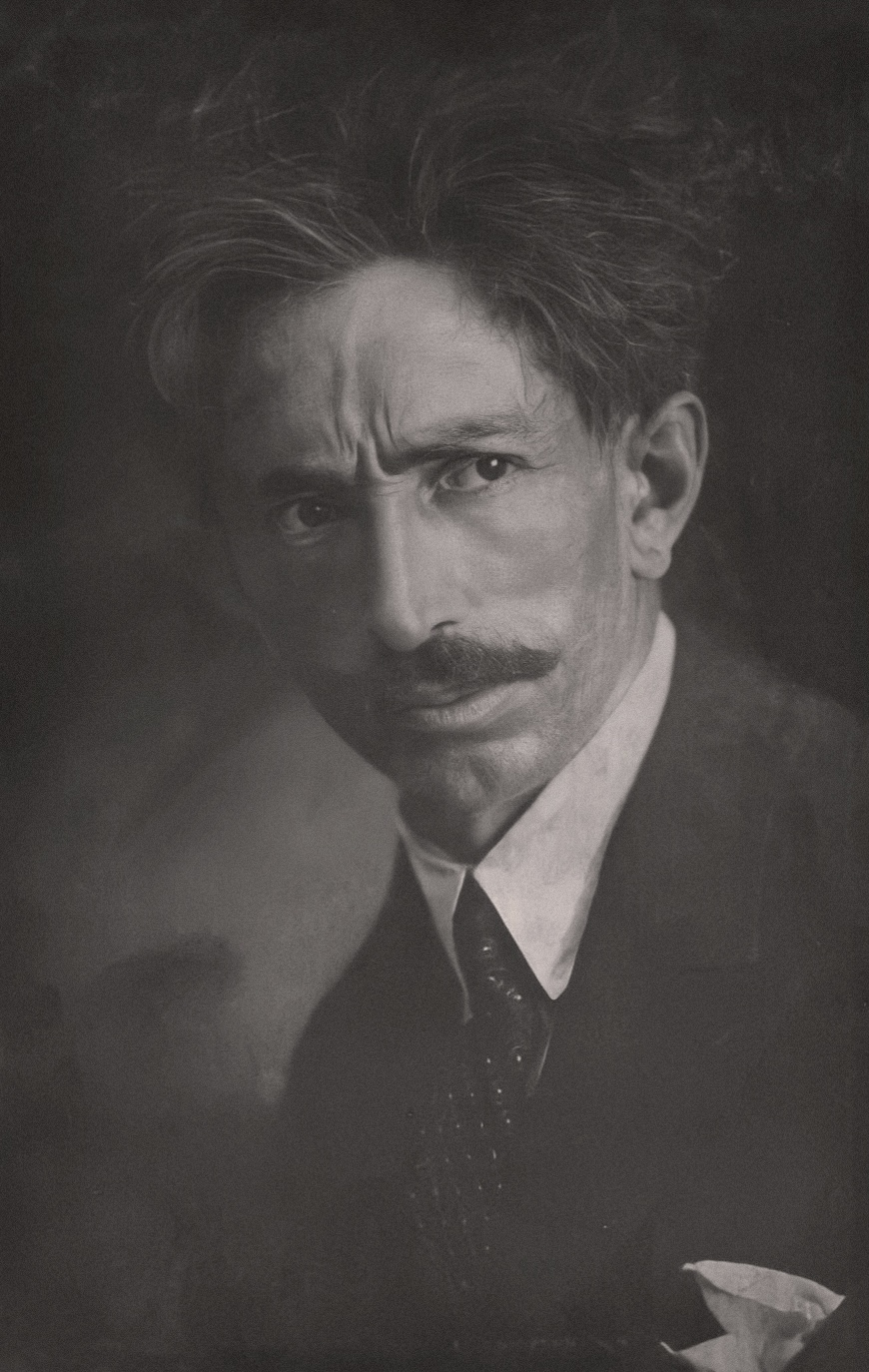
- Zija Dibra

Minister of Foreign Affairs
- In office March 28, 1921 – December 1921

Minister of War of Albania

Personal details
- Born: 1890 Debar, Western Macedonia
- Died: 1940 (aged 49–50)
- Known for: Participation in Young Turk movement and Albanian politics

Zija Dibra was an Ottoman and later Albanian officer and politician, Minister of Foreign Affairs and Minister of War of Albania.

== Biography ==
He was born in 1890 in the city of Debar in Western Macedonia. He graduated from the Istanbul Military Academy and pursued a career in the Ottoman Army. He participated in the Young Turk movement. He returned to Albania and on March 28, 1921, he became Minister of Foreign Affairs in the government of Pandeli Evangjeli. He was among the ministers who provoked the crisis in December, which led to the downfall of the government.

He was a member of the opposition wing of the so-called Holy League. Dibra was among the organizers of the uprising in March 1922, and on April 5 of the same year, he was sentenced to death in absentia. He left Albania and in 1923 he was in Vienna with Hasan Prishtina and Irfan Ohri, as part of an anti-Zogist organization founded by Aqif Elbasani.

He was pardoned on June 2, 1924, and returned to Albania in the same month. He supported the June Revolution and the government formed after it under Fan Noli. After Ahmet Zogu took power, Dibra fled to Yugoslavia, but was returned by the authorities. He was accused of Bolshevism on January 20, 1925, and was imprisoned in Berat. On the way, he was killed by the convoy while attempting to escape in the village of Harizaj.
