= Mali me Gropa-Bizë-Martanesh Nature Park =

Protected area in Albania

- IUCN category V (protected landscape/seascape)
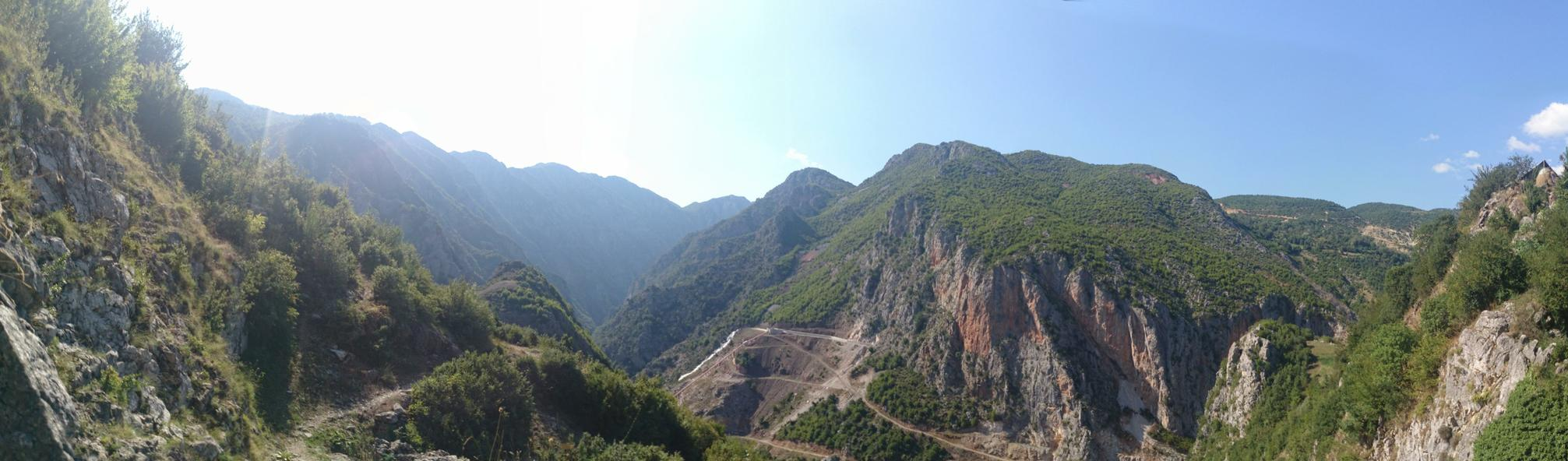
- Martanesh Canyon

- Location within Albania Location within Europe
- Location: Bulqizë, Mat, and Tirana District
- Nearest city: Tirana
- Coordinates: 41°22′24.43″N 20°1′28.06″E
- Area: 25,266.42 hectares (252.6642 km^{2})
- Established: 31 January 2007
- Governing body: Ministry of Environment

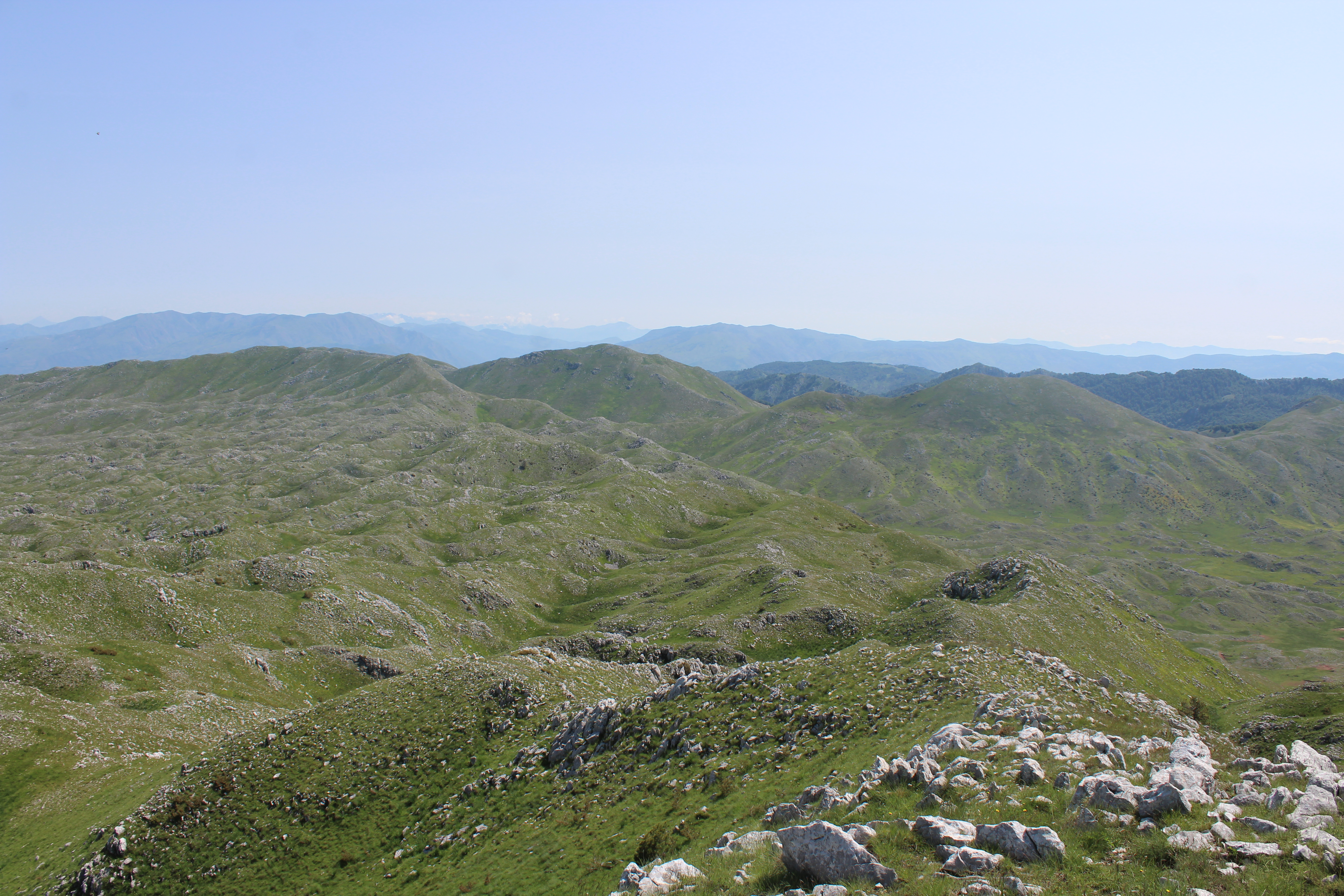
Habitat or species management area (IUCN Category IV) "Mali me Gropa - Bizë - Martanesh".

The Mali me Gropa-Bizë-Martanesh Nature Park (Albanian: Parku Natyror Mali me Gropa-Bizë-Martanesh) is a habitat or species management area (IUCN Category IV) in central Albania adjacent with the border with Dajti National Park. It covers a surface area of 25,266.42 hectares (252.6642 km^{2}). It is situated in Dibër and Tirana County with three municipalities, Xibër, Martanesh and Shëngjergj, and several villages within its territory. The International Union for Conservation of Nature (IUCN) has listed the landscape as Category V. The region has been as well recognised as an Important Plant Area of international importance by Plantlife.

The landscape preserves a great variety of flora and fauna. Biogeographically, the landscape falls within the Dinaric alpine mixed forests terrestrial ecoregion of the Palearctic temperate broadleaf and mixed forests biome. Forests occupy 68% of the landscape's total area, with dense coniferous and deciduous forest.

The vertebrate fauna of the landscape consists of 209 species and is represented by 44 species of mammals, 130 species of birds, 23 species of reptile and as well as 12 species of amphibia. The brown bear, grey wolf and lynx inhabit the forested regions. The red fox, roe deer, wild boar, red squirrel, european otter, hazel dormouse, and mediterranean horseshoe bat are the primary predatory mammals. A total of 130 bird species have been observed in the landscape, including the golden eagle, sparrowhawk, goshawk, northern goshawk, egyptian vulture, common buzzard, honey buzzard, alpine swift, alpine chough and so on. There are also numerous species of reptiles and amphibians. Among the most common are the alpine newt, european ratsnake, european pond turtle, and hermann's tortoise.

Due to the combination of climate, specific topography with many mountain massifs, rock formations, soil types and hydrological conditions, as well as the lack of a strong anthropogenic influence, have contributed to the formation of different habitat. There are 450 species of vascular plants, which constitute 12% of the total number of species in Albania. The vegetation of Mali me Gropa-Bizë-Martanesh is vertically divided into several distinct zones. Inside the Mediterranean zone, the coniferous zone is dominated by black pine, European beech, silver fir, austrian oak, hungarian oak, european smoketree. The deciduous zone is covered with european box, cade and jerusalem thorn. The Alpine zone is mainly composed with grass, moss, lichen and is as well abundant in bilberries and rare flowers. The most common species include spring gentian, rock rose, alpine aster, catsfoot, european blueberry and primrose.

The landscape includes five nature monuments such as the Caves of Xixelles, Valit, and Shutrese, Malit me Gropa, and a glacial valley and lake.

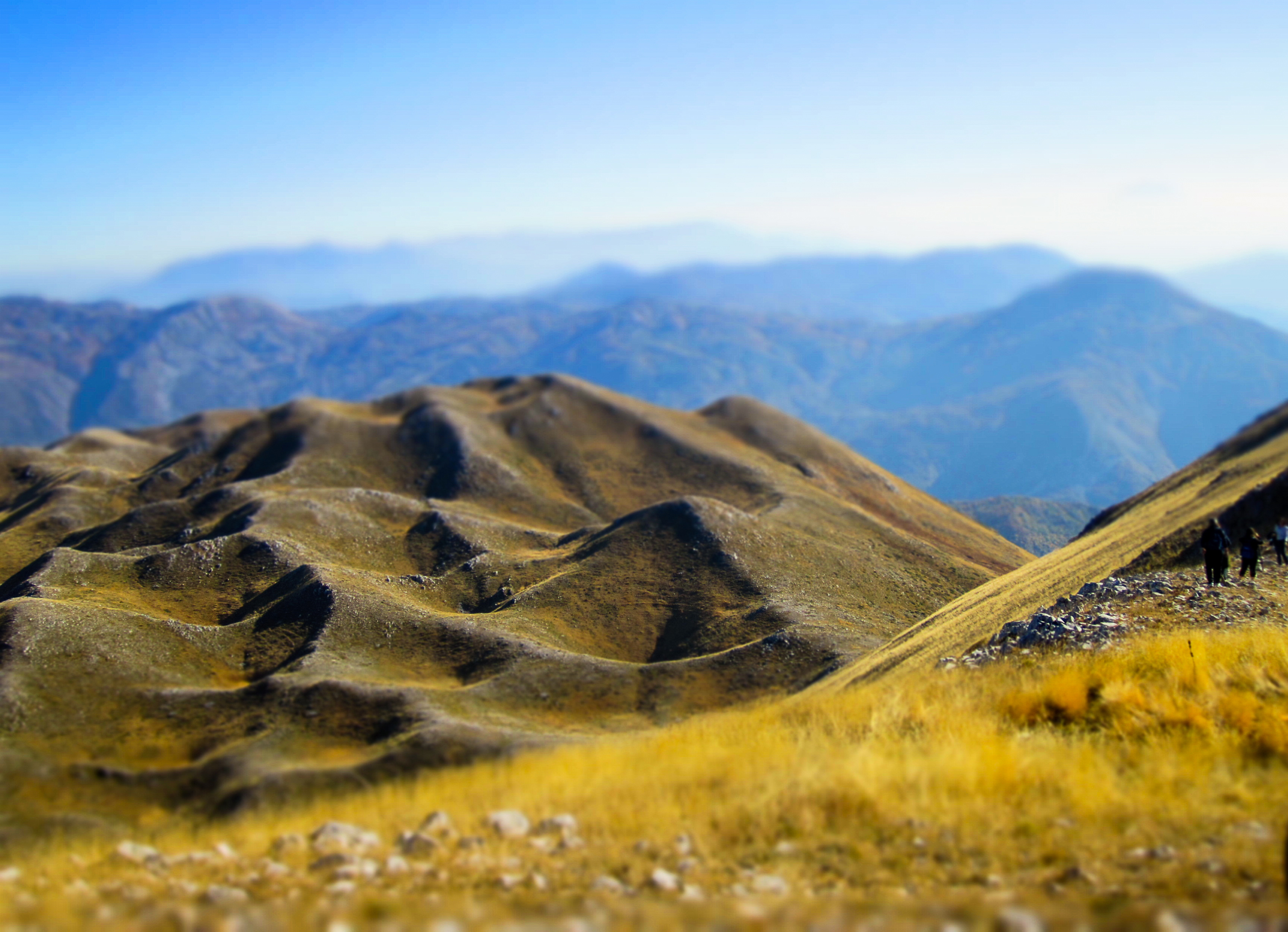
Mali me Gropa

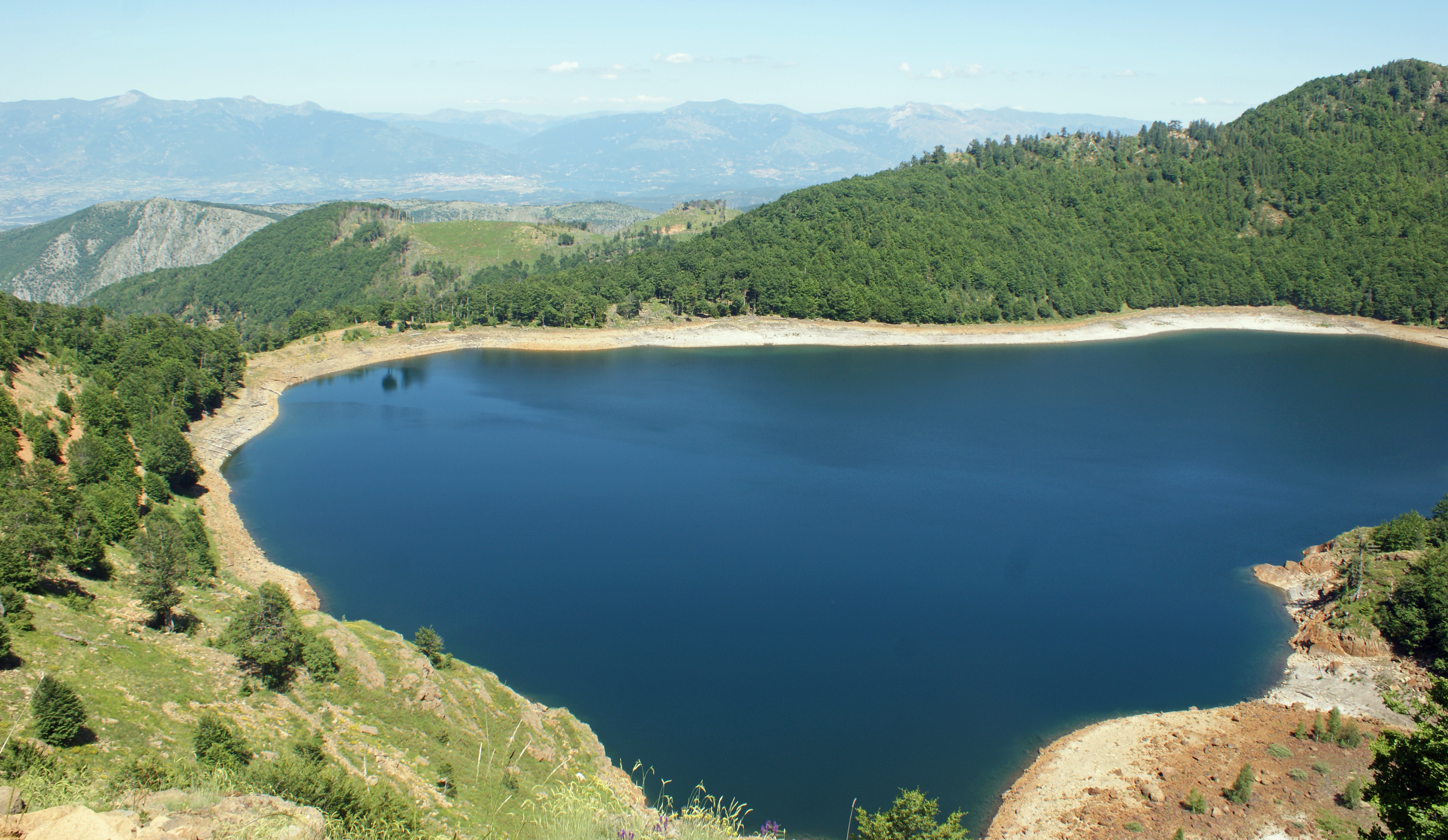
Liqeni i Zi

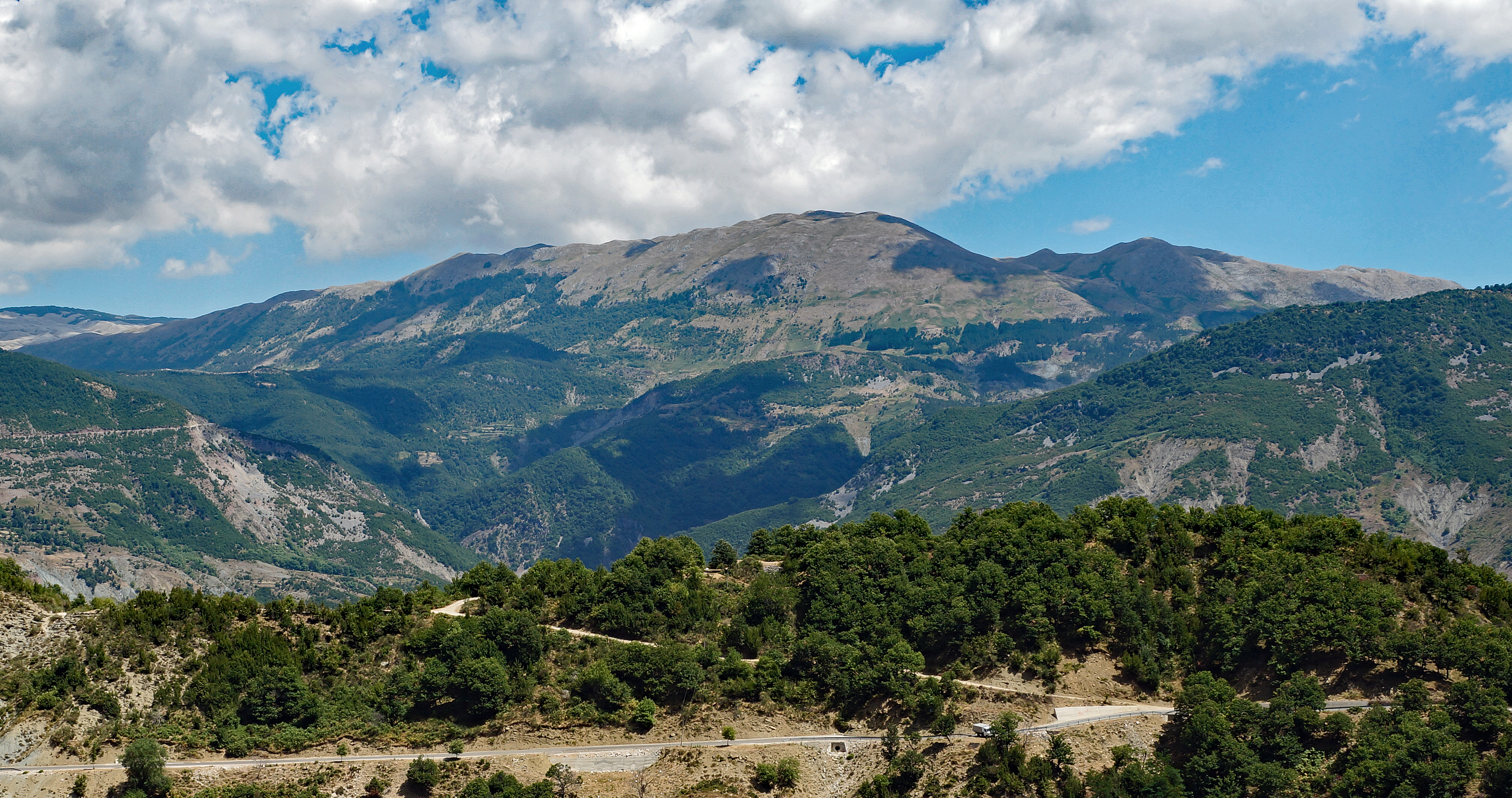
View from the Priska Pass

== See also ==
- Protected areas of Albania
- Geography of Albania
- Krahina Malore Qëndrore
