= Vilë-Ballaj =

- Village
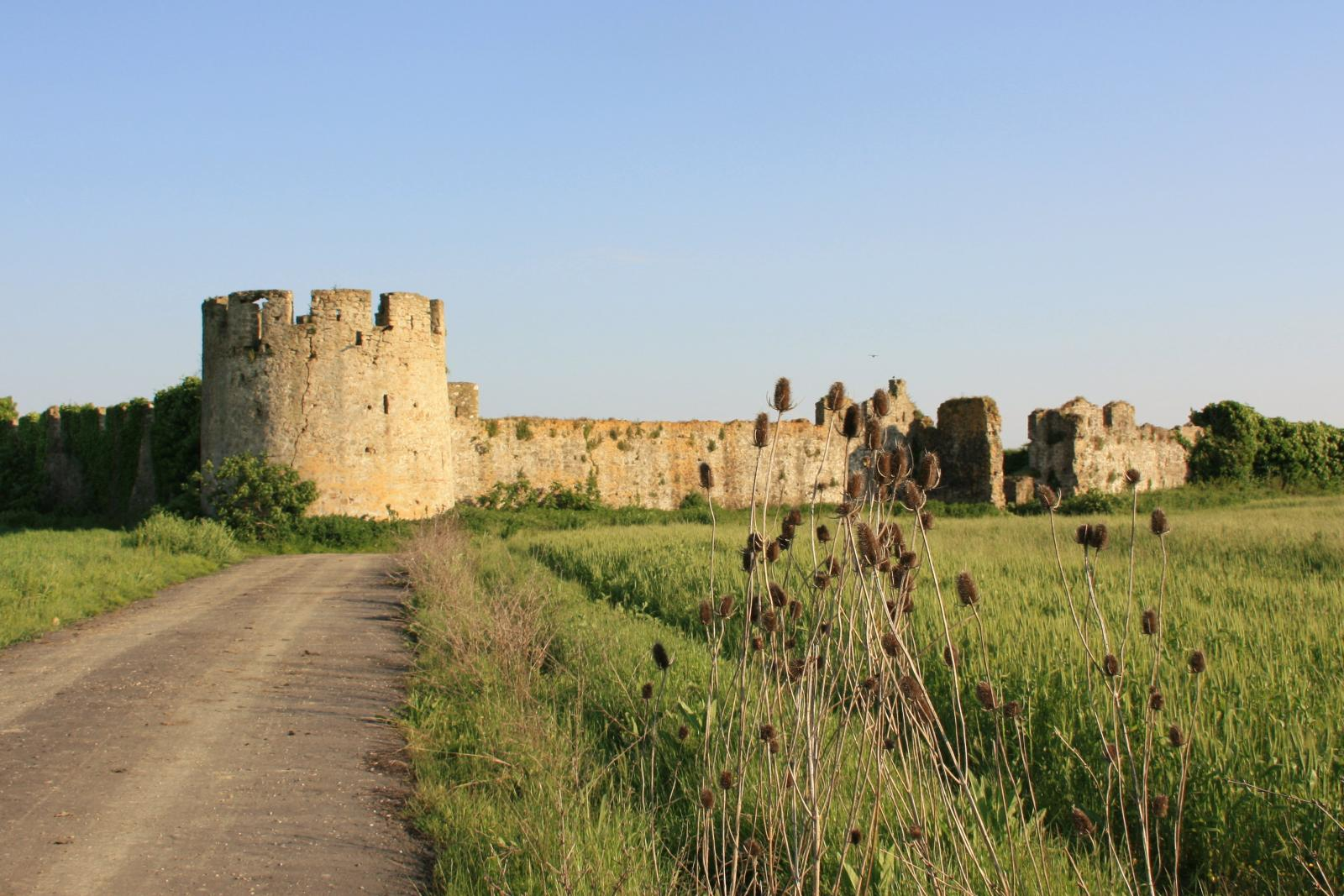
- Fortress of Bashtovë

- Location within Albania
- Coordinates: 41°3′28″N 19°31′47″E
- Country: Albania
- County: Tirana
- Municipality: Rrogozhinë
- Administrative unit: Gosë
- Time zone: UTC+1 (CET)
  - Summer (DST): UTC+2 (CEST)
- Postal Code: 2508
- Area Code: (0)55

Vilë-Ballaj is a village situated in the central plains of Albania's Western Lowlands region. It is part of Tirana County. At the 2015 local government reform it became part of the municipality Rrogozhinë. The Fortress of Bashtovë is close to the village.
