= Kakunj =

- Village
- Location within Albania
- Coordinates: 41°10′N 19°52′E
- Country: Albania
- County: Tirana
- Municipality: Tirana
- Administrative unit: Baldushk
- Time zone: UTC+1 (CET)
  - Summer (DST): UTC+2 (CEST)

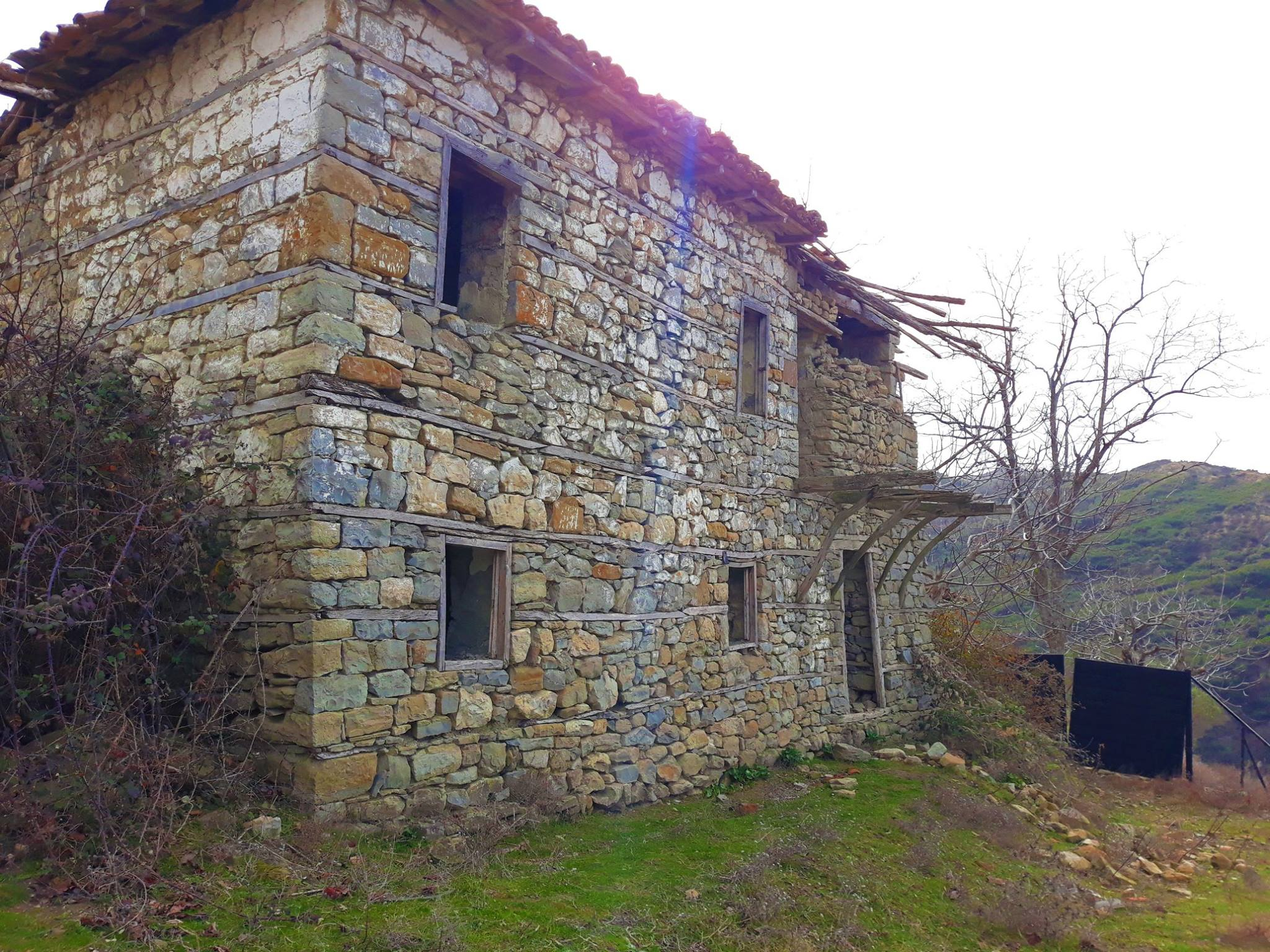

Kakunj is a village in the administrative unit of Baldushk in Tirana District, Albania. At the 2015 local government reform, it became part of the municipality Tirana. Kakunj is famous for its waterfall called the waterfall of Kakunja (alb: Ujëvara e Kakunjës) or as the local people call it, the waterfall of Askolaj (Askolaj is the name of the geographical location where the waterfall is located.

== Geography ==
The territory of Kakunjë village is located in a valley crossed by the Zhullima river and consists of fields and small hills. The hills are mainly covered with forests of the strawberry tree, holm oak, common juniper, heather, etc. Also, the village has under its territory a considerable area of coniferous forests of the pine type, that is also a natural park called "Parku i Pishave të Buta." As a well-known tourist spot is the Askolaj waterfall, which in recent years has become a very popular tourist attraction of the city of Tirana, but not only.

Approximately 500 inhabitants live in the village. Their settlements are mainly concentrated at the foot of the hills but also in the neighbourhood. The residences are 1-2 storey buildings built in the last 20 years. The inhabitants are mainly engaged in agriculture (vegetables, fruits, viticulture, olives) and to a lesser extent in livestock (cows, sheep, poultry and turkeys). During the last 20 years, the village has received a significant economic and social development as a result of the education of the younger generations as well as the remittances and investments of immigrants who work in different European countries.

== History ==
The history of the village dates back to the early periods of our history. This is proven by the ruins of Saint Mary's Church, which is a 1500-year-old church. Also, the early settlements of the village on the top of a hill, the village olive tree which is said to be over 500 years old, as well as the old cemetery of the village show its antiquity and history. After the 90s, the old Kakunja was completely abandoned and the residents all moved to the new Kakunja, which is located below. Beyond this fact, even today, the inhabitants use the geographical position and atmospheric conditions of the old village by planting new plots with olives and other trees.

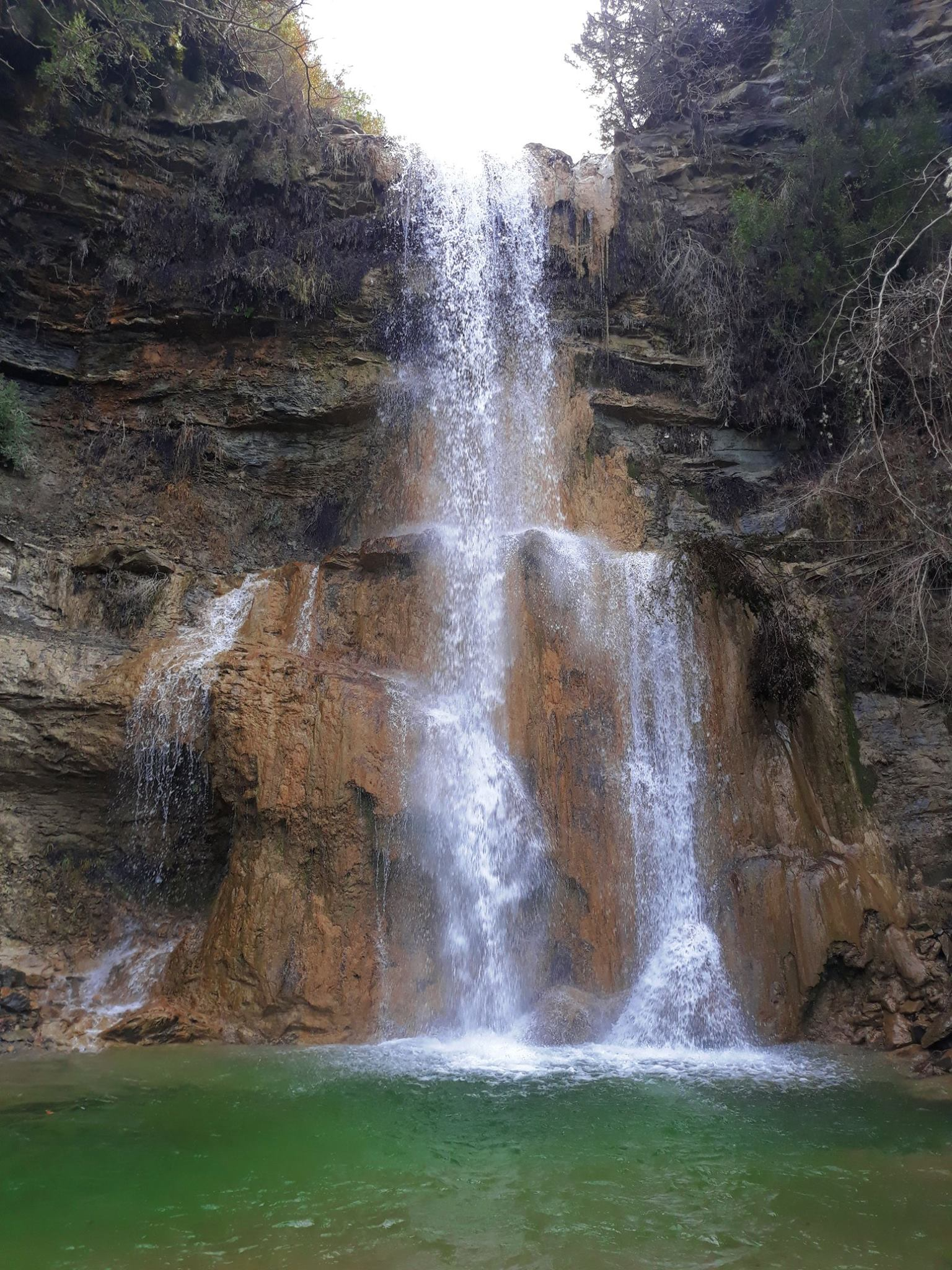
