= Ballashen-Pojanë =

- Village
- Interactive map of Ballashen-Pojanë
- Coordinates: 41.195°N 19.721°E
- Country: Albania
- County: Tirana County
- Time zone: UTC+1 (CET)
  - Summer (DST): UTC+2 (CEST)

Ballashen-Pojanë is a village in Tirana County, Albania.
