= Pinet =

Pinet may refer to:

- Pinet (power station), a hydroelectric power station in Aveyron, France
- Pinet, Albania, a village in Tirana municipality, Tirana County, Albania
- Pinet, Hérault, a commune in the Hérault department in the Languedoc-Roussillon region, France
- Pinet, Valencia, a municipality in the province of Valencia, Valencian Community, Spain
- 18111 Pinet, a main-belt asteroid
- Lac Pinet, a lake in Saint-Calixte, Quebec, Canada
