= Gosë =

- Administrative unit
- Emblem

- Location within Albania
- Coordinates: 41°5′43″N 19°36′53″E
- Country: Albania
- County: Tirana
- Municipality: Rrogozhinë
- Elevation: 20 m (66 ft)

Population (2011)
  - Administrative unit: 4,120
- Time zone: UTC+1 (CET)
  - Summer (DST): UTC+2 (CEST)
- Postal Code: 2508
- Area Code: (0)570

Gosë is a former rural municipality situated in the central plains of Albania's Western Lowlands region. It is part of Tirana County. At the 2015 local government reform it became a subdivision of the municipality Rrogozhinë. The population at the 2011 census was 4,120. The Fortress of Bashtovë is located in Gosë Administrative Unit.

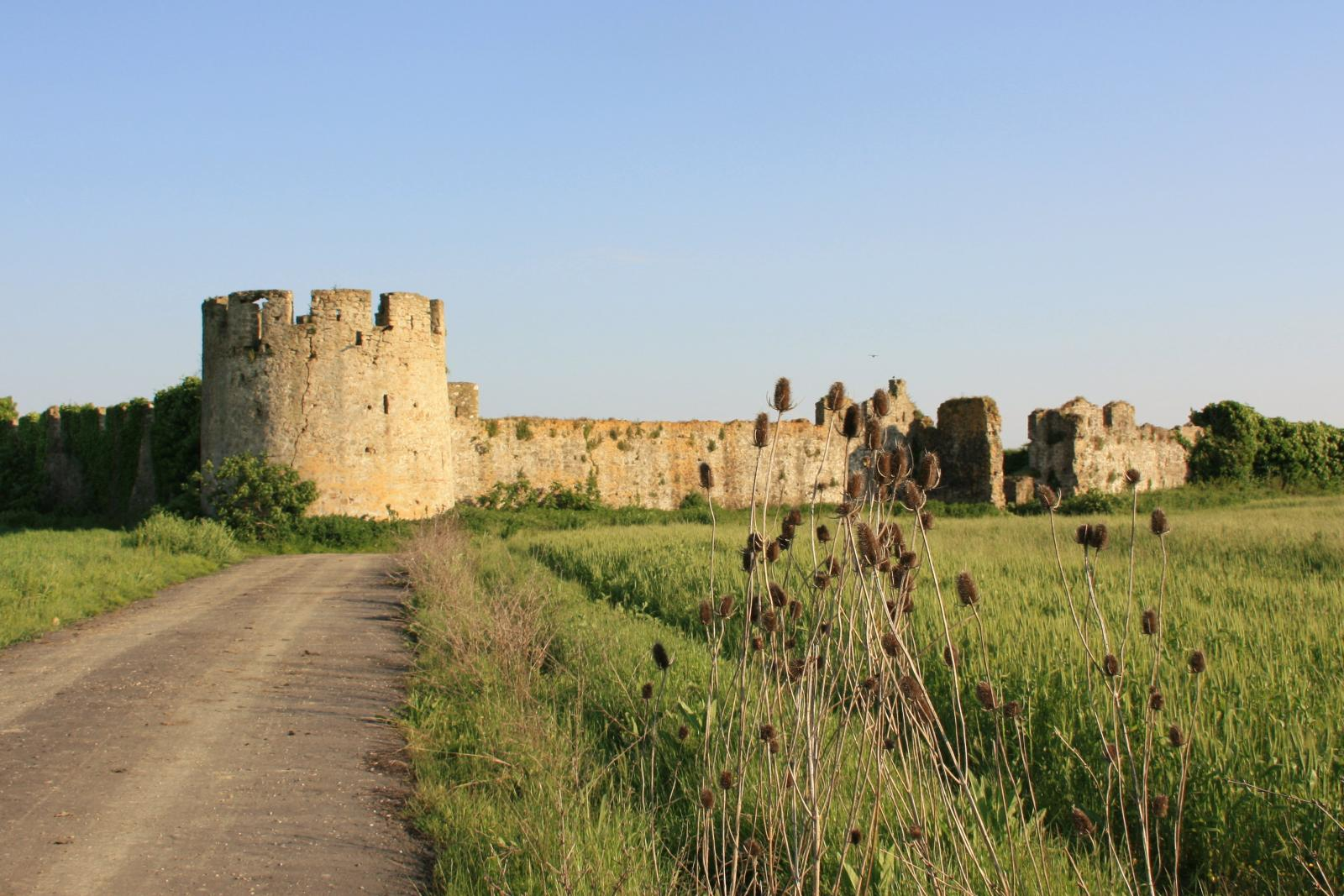
Bashtovë Fortress was built during the 15th century.

== Economy ==
In Gosë the climate is suitable for olives grove, there is an olive oil factory. There is a flour factory that has been restored and it dates since the Communist era in Albania. Many bars are situated in the town center.

== Tourism ==
Gosë administrative limit has Vilë Beach, near the mouth of Shkumbini river.

== Notable people ==
Eugert Zhupa, cyclist.

== Villages ==
- Gosë e Madhe
- Gosë e Vogël
- Vilë-Bashtovë
- Ballaj
- Kalush
