= Irfan Ohri =

Albanian politician

Irfan Bey Ohri was an Albanian politician and public figure.

== Biography ==
He was born in Ohrid, Ottoman Empire, now North Macedonia in 1884. In 1913, he lived in Elbasan and actively participated in the preparation of the Ohrid-Debar Uprising. He maintained contacts with Milan Matov, who considered him "omnipotent" at the time. During the uprising, Irfan Bey was in contact with both Matov and the Albanian government, which discreetly supported the insurgents. Irfan Ohri was a senator in the Senate of the National Assembly of Albania from March 27, 1920, to December 20, 1920, and a member of the National Assembly from April 21, 1921, to September 30, 1923. He left Albania and in 1923 was in Vienna with Hasan Prishtina and Zija Dibra, as part of an anti-Yugoslav organization founded by Aqif Elbasani. He died sometime in the 1940s.
