= Villages of Tirana County =

The Tirana County in central Albania is subdivided into 5 municipalities. These municipalities contain 235 towns and villages:
