= Shkozet =

- Village
- Location within Albania
- Coordinates: 41°6′2″N 19°34′24″E
- Country: Albania
- County: Durrës
- Municipality: DURRËS
- Administrative unit: Lekaj
- Time zone: UTC+1 (CET)
  - Summer (DST): UTC+2 (CEST)
- Postal Code: 2507
- Area Code: 055

Shkozet is a village situated in the central plains of Albania's Western Lowlands region. It is part of Durrës County. At the 2015 local government reform it became part of the municipality Durrës.
