= Rrogozhinë =

- Municipality
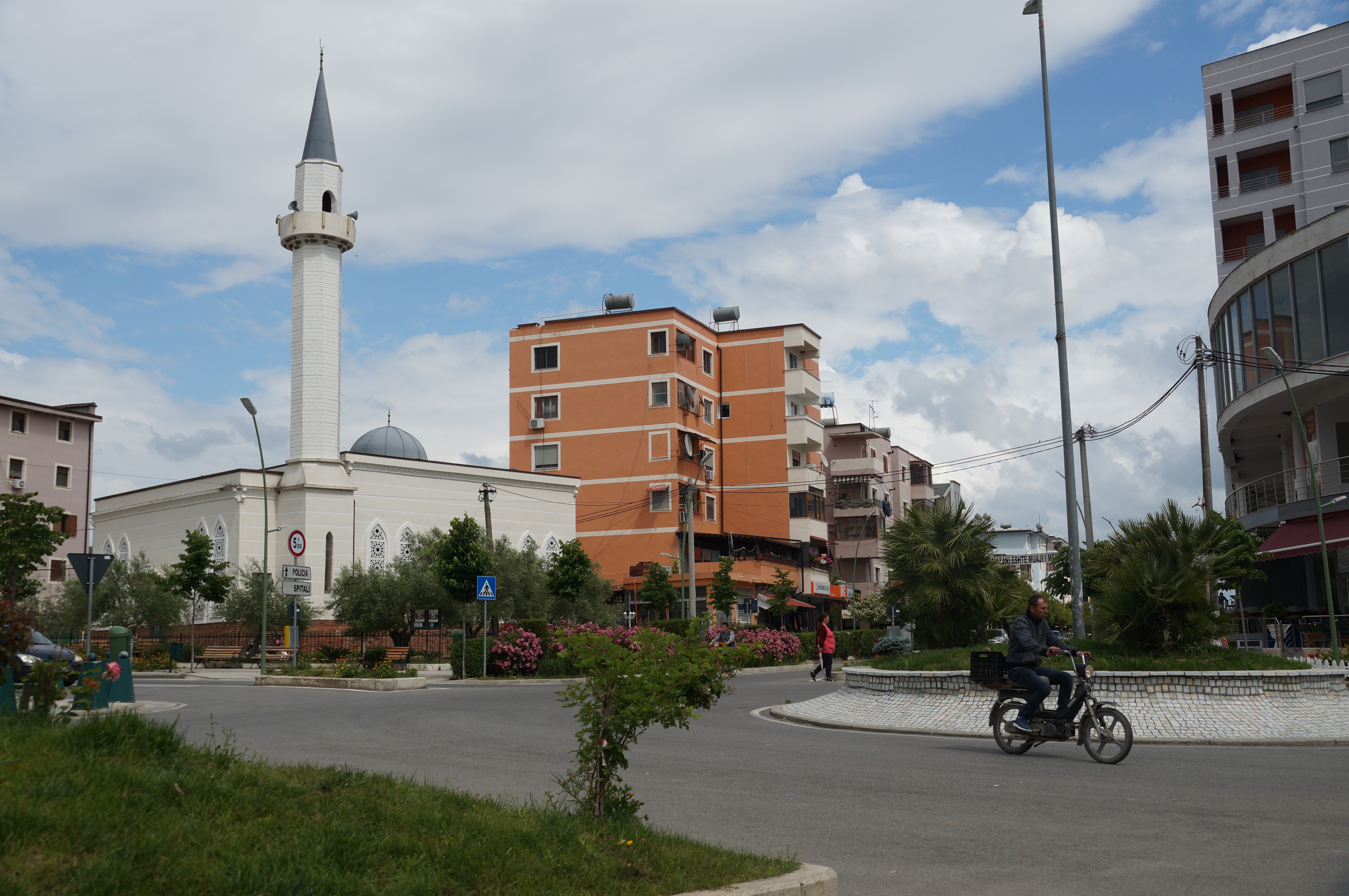
- Rrogozhinë town center

- Emblem

- Location within Albania
- Coordinates: 41°4′34″N 19°40′0″E
- Country: Albania
- County: Tirana

Government
  - Mayor: Andi Proshka (PS)

Area
  - Municipality: 223.50 km^{2} (86.29 sq mi)
  - Administrative unit: 9.15 km^{2} (3.53 sq mi)
- Elevation: 24 m (79 ft)

Population (2023)
  - Municipality: 12,567
  - Municipality density: 56.228/km^{2} (145.63/sq mi)
  - Administrative unit: 5,002
  - Administrative unit density: 547/km^{2} (1,420/sq mi)
- Time zone: UTC+1 (CET)
  - Summer (DST): UTC+2 (CEST)
- Postal Code: 2503
- Area Code: (0)577
- Website: bashkiarrogozhine.gov.al

Rrogozhinë (Albanian definite form: Rrogozhina) is a town and a municipality in Tirana County, centrally located in the Western Lowlands region of Albania. It was formed at the 2015 local government reform by the merger of the former municipalities Gosë, Kryevidh, Lekaj, Rrogozhinë and Sinaballaj, that became municipal units. The seat of the municipality is the town Rrogozhinë.

Positioned between Durrës, Lushnja and Elbasan, it is considered an important node of the VIII corridor and the railway intersection of Rrogozhinë – Durrës, Rrogozhinë – Vlorë and Rrogozhinë – Pogradec. Bashtova Castle, located in this territory, is considered one of the most important cultural heritage monuments of the area and a tourist attraction for foreign and domestic tourists. The laurel forest that flourishes around the Castle is considered a natural monument.

== History ==
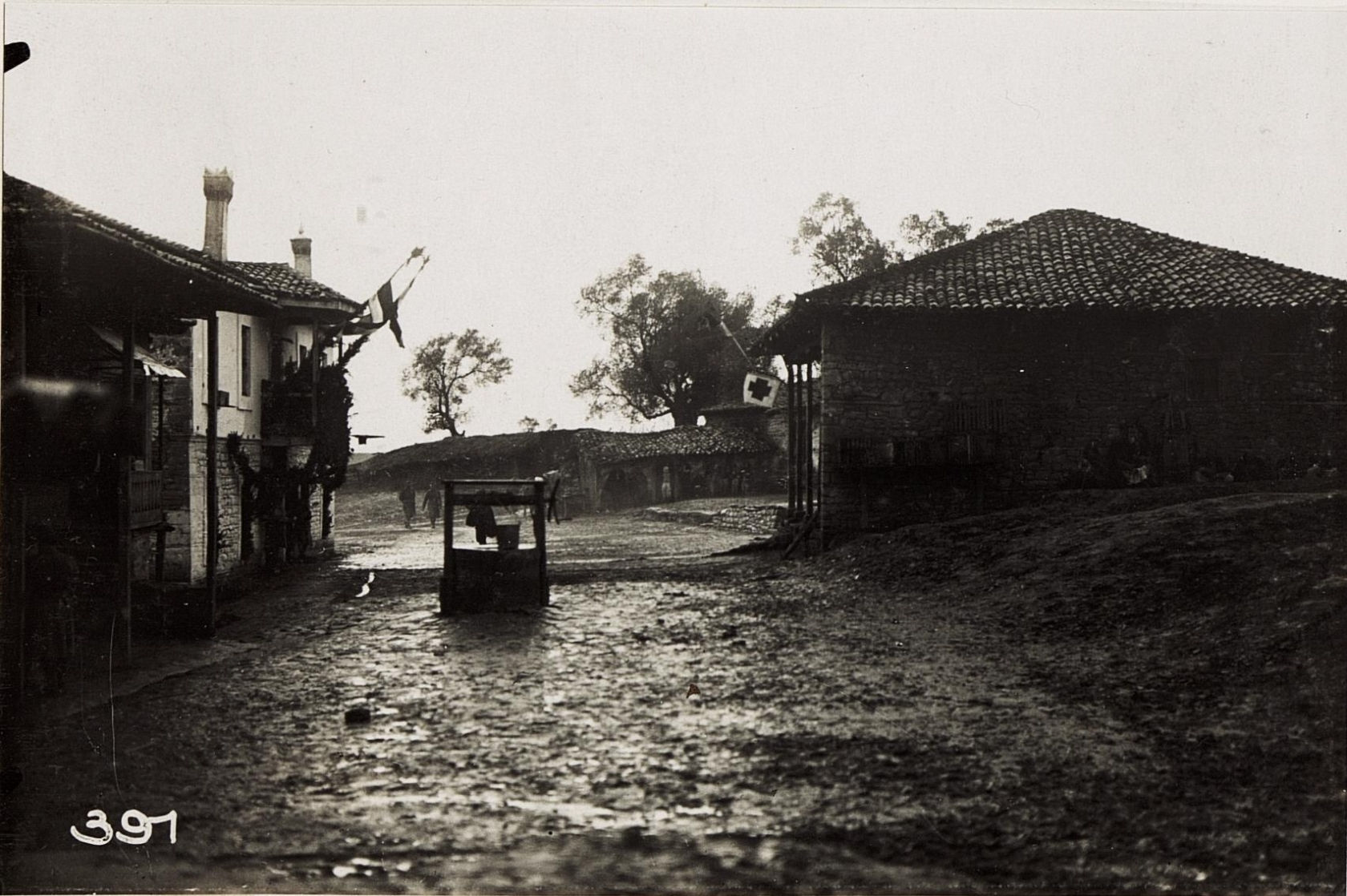
Rrogozhinë in c. 1917

The city of Rrogozhina, known in the archaeological and historical literature under the name “ASPARGAIUM”, is mentioned as an ancient settlement and an important geographical and historical crossroads. Aspargaium was located at the intersection of two segments of the “Egnatia” road, which came from Apollonia and Dyrrah in the direction of Rome and Constantinople.

Today’s Rrogozhina was built in the communist period around agro-industry, such as the oil factory, soap factory or cotton ones, as well as a line for processing and preserving food.

== Demography ==
Historical population
Year	Pop.	±%
1989	6,882	—
2001	7,071	+2.7%
2011	7,049	−0.3%
2023	5,002	−29.0%

The municipality's population is 12,567 as of the 2023 census, 5,002 of which is in the municipal unit, in a total area of 223.73 km^{2} (86.38 sq mi). The population is mostly ethnically Albanian.

== Villages ==
Municipal Unit

- Gosë
- Lekaj
- Kryevidh
- Sinaballaj
- Rrogozhinë
Villages
- Ballaj
- Damarkaj
- Domën
- Fliballie
- German
- Gosë e Madhe
- Gosë e Vogël
- Hamenraj
- Harizaj
- Hasdushk
- Kalush
- Kazie
- Kërçukaj
- Koçaj-Sheshaj
- Kodrasej
- Kryevidh
- Lekaj
- Levanaj
- Luz i Madh
- Memollaj
- Methasanaj
- Mlik
- Mushnikë
- Okshtun
- Patk-Milot
- Rrostej
- Rreth-Greth
- Sinaballaj
- Spanesh
- Spille
- Stërbeg
- Sharrdushk
- Shkozet
- Thartor
- Vilë-Ballaj
- Zambish
- Zashtik
- Zhabjak

Map of Rrogozhinë Municipality as defined by the Territorial Administrative Reform of 2015

== Sports ==
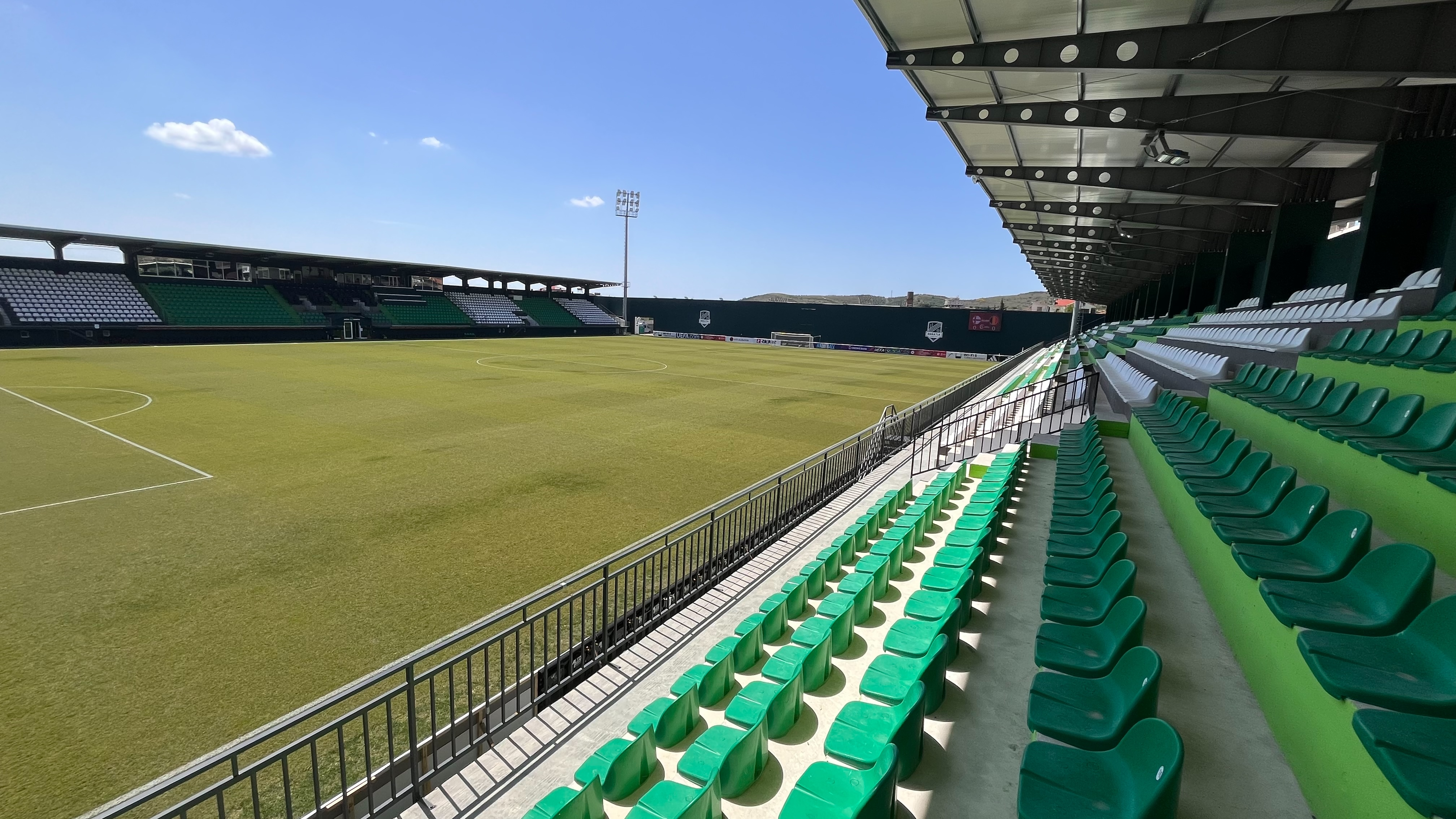
Egnatia Arena

Rrogozhinë is home to three-time Kategoria Superiore champions KF Egnatia, who were founded in 1962. Their home ground is the Egnatia Arena.
