= Shëngjergj =

- Administrative unit
- Location within Albania
- Coordinates: 41°20′N 20°6′E
- Country: Albania
- County: Tirana
- Municipality: Tirana
  - Administrative unit: 170.4 km^{2} (65.8 sq mi)

Population (2023)
  - Administrative unit: 1,377
  - Administrative unit density: 8.081/km^{2} (20.93/sq mi)
- Time zone: UTC+1 (CET)
  - Summer (DST): UTC+2 (CEST)
- Postal Code: 1043
- Area Code: (0)49

Shëngjergj (Albanian for Saint George) is a village and a former municipality in Tirana County, central Albania. At the 2015 local government reform it became a subdivision of the municipality of Tirana. The population at the 2011 census was 2,186.

== Demographic history ==
Historical population
Year	Pop.	±%
1989	5,778	—
2001	3,899	−32.5%
2011	2,186	−43.9%
2023	1,377	−37.0%

Shëngjergj appears in the Ottoman defter of 1467 as a settlement in the timar of the Muslim convert Yusuf, belonging to the wider region of Tamadhea in the vilayet of Çermeniça. The village had a total of 12 households which were represented by the following household heads: Ishri Somruni, Mihal Uraji (possibly, Vraji), Petër Mirali, Nikolla Goranzi, Petër Pirati, Nikolla Korriku, Mekshe Lleshi (possibly, Leshi), Andrije Uraji, Shar Bogdani, Gjon Bureshi, Ilia Qinami, and Petër Gurabardi.
