= Pezë =

- Administrative unit
- Location within Albania
- Coordinates: 41°13′N 19°42′E
- Country: Albania
- County: Tirana
- Municipality: Tirana
  - Administrative unit: 98.13 km^{2} (37.89 sq mi)

Population (2023)
  - Administrative unit: 5,704
  - Administrative unit density: 58.13/km^{2} (150.5/sq mi)
- Time zone: UTC+1 (CET)
  - Summer (DST): UTC+2 (CEST)
- Postal Code: 1038
- Area Code: (0)48

Pezë (Albanian definite form: Peza) is a former municipality in the Tirana County, central Albania. At the 2015 local government reform it became a subdivision of the municipality Tirana. The population at the 2011 census was 6,272. Peza was the headquarters of the National Liberation Movement of Albania. Myslym Peza (1 May 1897 – 7 February 1984) was a distinguished World War II veteran who led the anti-fascist movement "Çeta e Pezës", the members of which founded the Communist Party of Albania. Born and raised in Peza, the conference of Peza occurred in his home. It has a population of about 5,700 as of the 2023 census.

Historical population
Year	Pop.	±%
1989	4,643	—
2001	5,059	+9.0%
2011	6,272	+24.0%
2023	5,704	−9.1%
