= Ndroq =

- Administrative unit
- Location within Albania
- Coordinates: 41°16′N 19°39′E
- Country: Albania
- County: Tirana
- Municipality: Tirana

Population (2011)
  - Administrative unit: 5,035
- Time zone: UTC+1 (CET)
  - Summer (DST): UTC+2 (CEST)
- Postal Code: 1036
- Area Code: (0)48

Ndroq is a village and a former municipality near Tirana, the capital of Albania. It is part of Tirana County. At the 2015 local government reform it became a subdivision of the municipality Tirana. The population at 2011 census was 5,035.
