= Zall-Herr =

Village in Albania

- Administrative unit
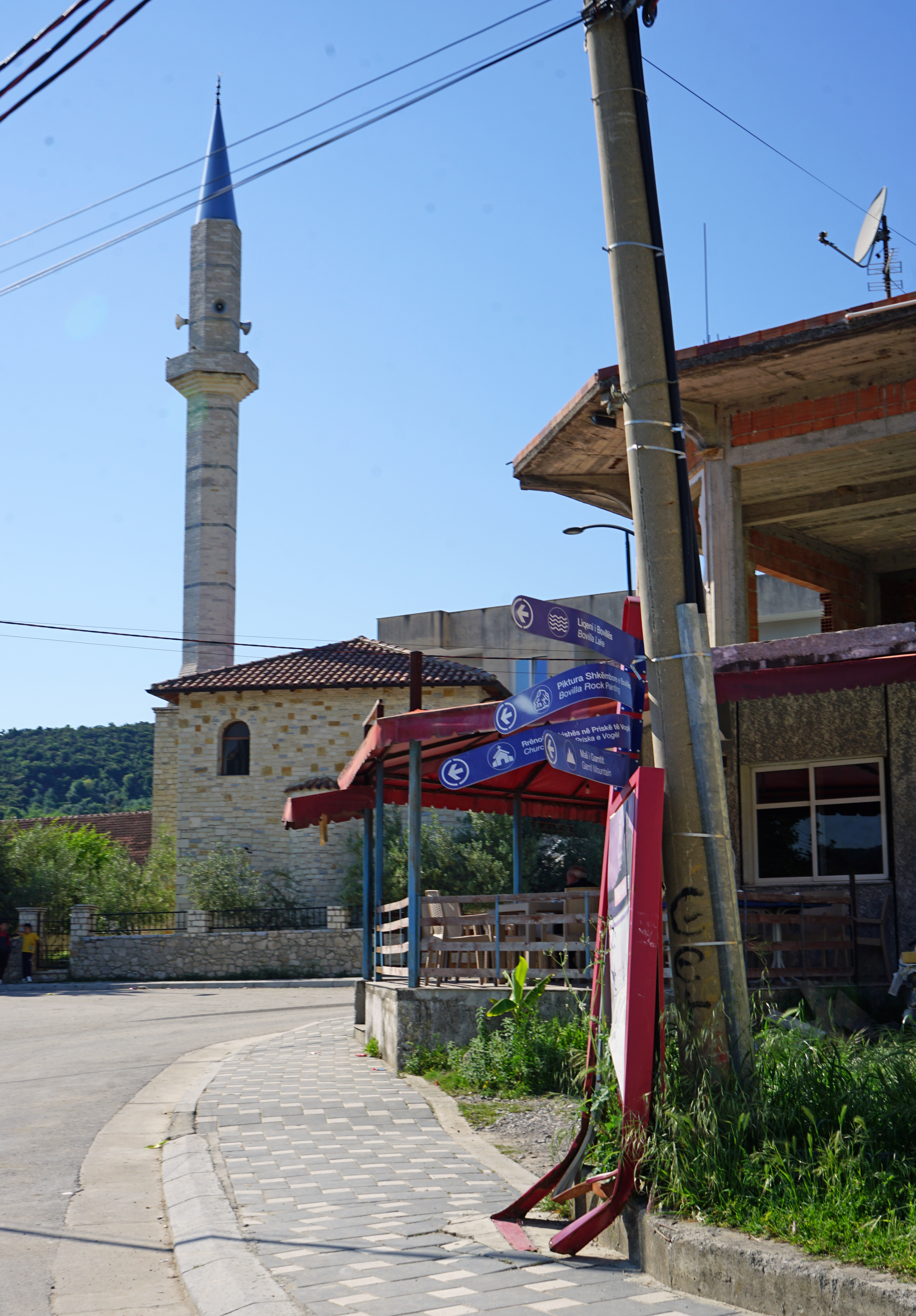
- Center of the village Zall-Herr with the mosque

- Location within Albania
- Coordinates: 41°23′N 19°50′E
- Country: Albania
- County: Tirana
- Municipality: Tirana
  - Administrative unit: 55.88 km^{2} (21.58 sq mi)

Population (2023)
  - Administrative unit: 8,822
  - Administrative unit density: 157.9/km^{2} (408.9/sq mi)
- Time zone: UTC+1 (CET)
  - Summer (DST): UTC+2 (CEST)
- Postal Code: 1048
- Area Code: (0)47

Zall-Herr (Albanian: [zaɫ hɛr]) is a village and administrative unit in the municipality of Tirana, central Albania. As of the 2011 census, the administrative unit of Zall-Herr had a population of 9,389 of whom 4,830 were men and 4,559 women.

Historical population
Year	Pop.	±%
1989	5,375	—
2001	7,409	+37.8%
2011	9,389	+26.7%
2023	8,822	−6.0%
