= Kryevidh =

- Administrative unit
- Emblem

- Location within Albania
- Coordinates: 41°5′51″N 19°31′36″E
- Country: Albania
- County: Tirana
- Municipality: Rrogozhinë

Population (2011)
  - Administrative unit: 4,662
- Time zone: UTC+1 (CET)
  - Summer (DST): UTC+2 (CEST)
- Postal Code: 2510
- Area Code: (0)579

Kryevidh is a village and former rural municipality situated in the central plains of Albania's Western Lowlands region. It is part of Tirana County. At the 2015 local government reform it became a subdivision of the municipality Rrogozhinë. The population at the 2011 census was 4,662.
