= Lekaj, Albania =

Lekaj
- Administrative unit
- Emblem

- Location within Albania
- Coordinates: 41°6′53″N 19°36′35″E
- Country: Albania
- County: Tirana
- Municipality: Rrogozhinë

Population (2011)
  - Administrative unit: 5,126
- Time zone: UTC+1 (CET)
  - Summer (DST): UTC+2 (CEST)
- Postal Code: 2507
- Area Code: (0)570

Lekaj is a village and a former municipality situated in the central plains of Albania's Western Lowlands region. It is part of Tirana County. At the 2015 local government reform it became a subdivision of the municipality Rrogozhinë. The population at the 2011 census was 5,126.
