= Sinaballaj =

- Administrative unit
- Location within Albania
- Coordinates: 41°4′8″N 19°41′54″E
- Country: Albania
- County: Tirana
- Municipality: Rrogozhinë

Population (2011)
  - Administrative unit: 1,191
- Time zone: UTC+1 (CET)
  - Summer (DST): UTC+2 (CEST)
- Postal Code: 2511
- Area Code: (0)570

Sinaballaj is a village and an administrative unit situated in the central plains of Albania's Western Lowlands region. A former rural municipality, it is now part of Tirana County. At the 2015 local government reform it became a subdivision of the municipality Rrogozhinë. The population at the 2011 census was 1,191.
