= Tirana County =

County in central Albania

Tirana County Qarku i Tiranës (Albanian)
- County
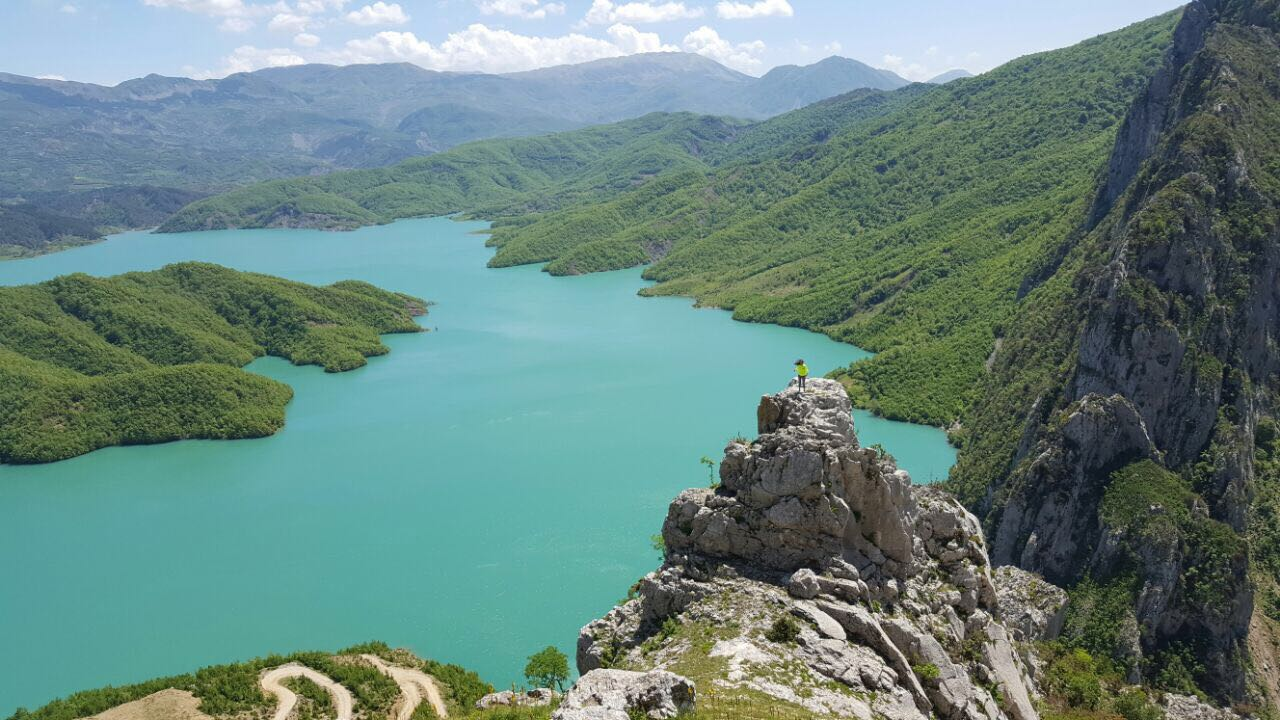
- Lake Bovilla

- Flag Emblem

- Map of Albania with Tirana County highlighted
- Coordinates: 41°15′N 19°45′E
- Country: Albania
- Seat: Tirana
- Subdivisions: 5 municipalities: Kamëz; Kavajë; Rrogozhinë; Tirana; Vorë

Government
  - Prefect: Afrim Qendro (PS)

Area
  - Total: 1,652 km^{2} (638 sq mi)
  - Rank: 10th

Population (2023)
  - Total: 758,513
  - Rank: 1st
  - Density: 459.1/km^{2} (1,189/sq mi)
- Time zone: UTC+1 (CET)
  - Summer (DST): UTC+2 (CEST)
- HDI (2023): 0.860 very high · 1st of 12
- NUTS Code: AL022
- Website: qarkutirane.gov.al

Tirana County (Albanian: Qarku Tiranë), officially the County of Tirana (Albanian: Qarku i Tiranës), is a county in the Central Region of Albania. It is the tenth-largest by area and the most populous of the twelve counties according to the 2023 Census, with about 760,000 inhabitants within an area of 1,652 km^{2} (638 sq mi). The county borders on the Adriatic Sea to the west, the counties of Durrës to the northwest, Dibër to the northeast, Elbasan to the east and Fier to the southwest. It is divided into five municipalities, Tirana, Kamëz, Kavajë, Rrogozhinë and Vorë, with all of whom incorporate twenty-nine administrative units.

Geographically, Tirana extends from the high and rugged Skanderbeg Mountains in the east to the flat shores of the Albanian Adriatic Sea Coast along the Mediterranean Sea. Due to its location and the close proximity to the Adriatic Sea, its climate is particularly influenced by a Mediterranean climate with four distinct seasons. Two of the country's fourteen National Parks are located in the county, with Dajti in the center and Divjakë-Karavasta in the southwest.

Historically, Tirana has been populated since Paleolithic times dating back 10,000 to 30,000 years ago. As argued by various archaeologists, the populated places are filled with Ancient Illyrian toponyms, as its precincts are some of the earliest regions in Albania to be inhabited. Nevertheless, the city of Tirana was established as a city centuries later in 1614 during the Ottoman occupation of Albania.

The capital of the county is Tirana, which is also the largest city by area and population in Albania. A gamma-world-city, it is the most influential economic and political center of the country.

== History ==
=== Pre-Albanian Independence ===
The region, which presently corresponds to the territory of the county of Tirana, has been continuously inhabited since the Paleolithic some 10,000 to 30,000 years ago, as suggested by evidence from tools excavated near Mount Dajt's quarry and within the Cave of Pëllumbas. As argued by various archaeologists, Tirana and its suburbs are filled with Illyrian toponyms, as its precincts are some of the earliest inhabited regions in Albania.

The oldest discovery in downtown Tirana was a Roman house, later transformed into an aisleless church with a mosaic-floor, dating to the 3rd century A.D., with other remains found near a medieval temple at Shengjin Fountain in the eastern suburbs. A castle possibly called Tirkan or Theranda, whose remnants are found along Murat Toptani Street, was built by Emperor Justinian in 520 A.D. and restored by Ahmed Pasha Toptani in the 18th century. The area had no special importance in Illyrian and classical times. In 1510, Marin Barleti, an Albanian Catholic priest and scholar, in the biography of the Albanian national hero Skanderbeg referred to this area as a small village.

== Geography ==
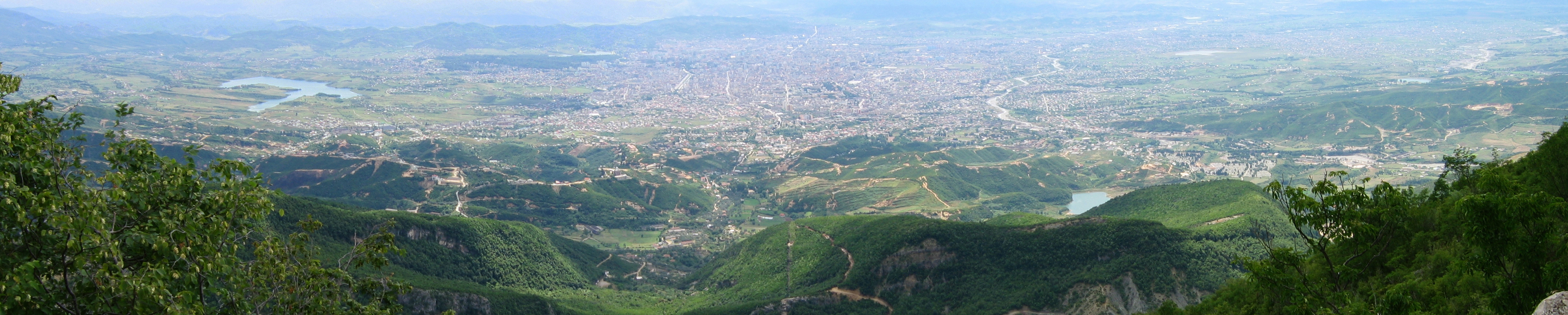
Panorama of Tirana viewed from Mount Dajt in the Dajti National Park.

Defined in an area of 1,652 km^{2} (638 sq mi), Tirana County is located in the Central Region of the Republic of Albania and bordered by the Adriatic Sea to the west, the counties of Durrës to the northwest, Dibër to the northeast, Elbasan to the east and Fier to the southwest. The county lies between latitudes 41° and 18° N and longitudes 19° and 56° E. The highest point is Mali me Gropa at 1,828 m (5,997 ft) above the Adriatic, though the lowest point is the Adriatic Sea at 0 m (0 ft).

Tirana County from the shorelines of the Mediterranean Sea in the west to the mountains of the Skanderbeg Mountains system in the east. The flat plain of the Albanian Adriatic Sea Coast in the west contains the Myzeqe Plain. To the east lie the hilly, mountainous region of the Skanderbeg Mountains separating the Western Lowlands from the Central Mountain Range. Three rivers traverse the county, including the Erzen River, the Ishëm River and the Shkumbin River along the border with Elbasan County.

=== Climate ===
The Adriatic Sea and Skanderbeg Mountains have a particular influence to the climate of Tirana County, though it has a Mediterranean climate with four distinct seasons. Summers are generally warm and dry, while winters are relatively cool and mild, and rarely very cold. The highest temperature of 41.5 °C (106.7 °F) was recorded in the city of Tirana, whereas the lowest temperature of −34.7 °C (−30.5 °F) was recorded in the village of Bizë.

=== Protected areas ===
The Ministry of Tourism and Environment administers a number of natural sites and protected areas in Tirana County. In conjunction with numerous national natural sites and areas, the National Agency of Protected Areas also manages the Dajti Mountain National Park, Divjakë-Karavasta National Park and the Mali me Gropa-Bizë-Martanesh Protected Landscape.

== Demographics ==
Historical population
Year	Pop.	±%
1989	449,228	—
2001	597,899	+33.1%
2011	749,365	+25.3%
2023	758,513	+1.2%

Tirana County is the most populous and densely populated county of the Republic of Albania, with an increasing population. Its center of population is located across the Plain of Tirana, in the metropolitan area of Tirana. The population as of the 2023 census is 758,513, constituting 31.6% of Albania's population.

Tirana County has experienced a generally high rate of population increase since the late twentieth century in part due to the fall of communism. Internal migration has been a significant factor in its population growth, especially from Berat, Dibër and Kukës. Nonetheless, the most densely populated areas are positioned in the flat western half, and the region around the relatively small corridor of the city of Tirana, thus the lowest densities are located in the mountainous eastern half.

According to the 2023 census, Tirana County had 758,513 residents, of whom 742,497 were born in Albania and 16,016 abroad. The majority of residents (392,803) were born in Tirana Prefecture itself, while substantial numbers originated from other prefectures, particularly Dibër (63,692), Kukës (48,466), Korçë (38,816), Fier (33,061), Berat (32,175) and Elbasan (32,052). Smaller communities were born in Gjirokastër (27,311), Shkodër (23,178), Durrës (20,317), Vlorë (16,589), and Lezhë (14,037).

The 2023 census documented Tirana County as 93.87% Albanian, 0.70% Romani and Balkan Egyptian, 0.19% Bulgarian, 0.19% Greek, 0.06% Aromanian, and the remainder belonging to another ethnic group, mixed heritage or no answer provided.

=== Religion ===
According to the 2023 census, Tirana County was home to largest religious group, the Muslims, followed by various Christian groups, alongside a large non-religious population. Overall, 63.9% of residents identified with a religion. Between the 2011 and 2023 censuses in Tirana County, there were notable shifts in religious affiliation. The Sunni Muslim population is around 60-70% while Bektashi Muslims rose from 2.7% to 4.9%. The Catholic Christian population slightly declined from 5.3% to 4.7%, and Orthodox Christians remained relatively stable, increasing marginally from 5.1% to 5.0%. Evangelical Christians experienced a modest rise, from 0.2% to 0.6%.

There was a substantial increase in the irreligious population: atheists rose from 2.7% to 3.7%, and those identifying as believers without religion/denomination grew from 3.9% to 12.9%. Meanwhile, the "Not stated/other" category saw a slight decrease, dropping from 19.4% to 18.3%.

Population of Tiranë according to religious group (2011–2023)
Religion group	Census 2011		Census 2023		Difference (2023−2011)	
Religion group	Number	Percentage	Number	Percentage	Number	Percentage
Sunni Muslim	466,760	62.28%	369,190	48.67%	-97,570	-13.61%
Bektashi Muslim	19,909	2.65%	37,515	4.94%	+17,606	+2.29%
Total Muslim	486,669	64.94%	406,705	53.61%	-79,964	-11.33%
Catholic Christian	39,745	5.3%	35,375	4.66%	-4,370	-0.64%
Orthodox Christian	37,890	5.05%	38,075	5.01%	+185	-0.04%
Evangelical/Other christians	1,783	0.23%	5,737	0.75%	+3,954	+0.52%
Total Christian	79,418	10.6%	79,187	10.44%	-231	-0.16%
Atheists	20,558	2.7%	27,714	3.65%	+7,156	+0.95%
Believers without religion/denomination	29,579	3.9%	117,935	15.54%	+88,356	+11.64%
Total Non-religious	50,137	6.7%	145,649	19.2%	+95,512	+12.5%
Not stated / other	145,258	19.4%	126,972	16.7%	-18,286	-2.7%
TOTAL	749,365	100%	758,513	100%	+9,148	–

=== Settlements ===
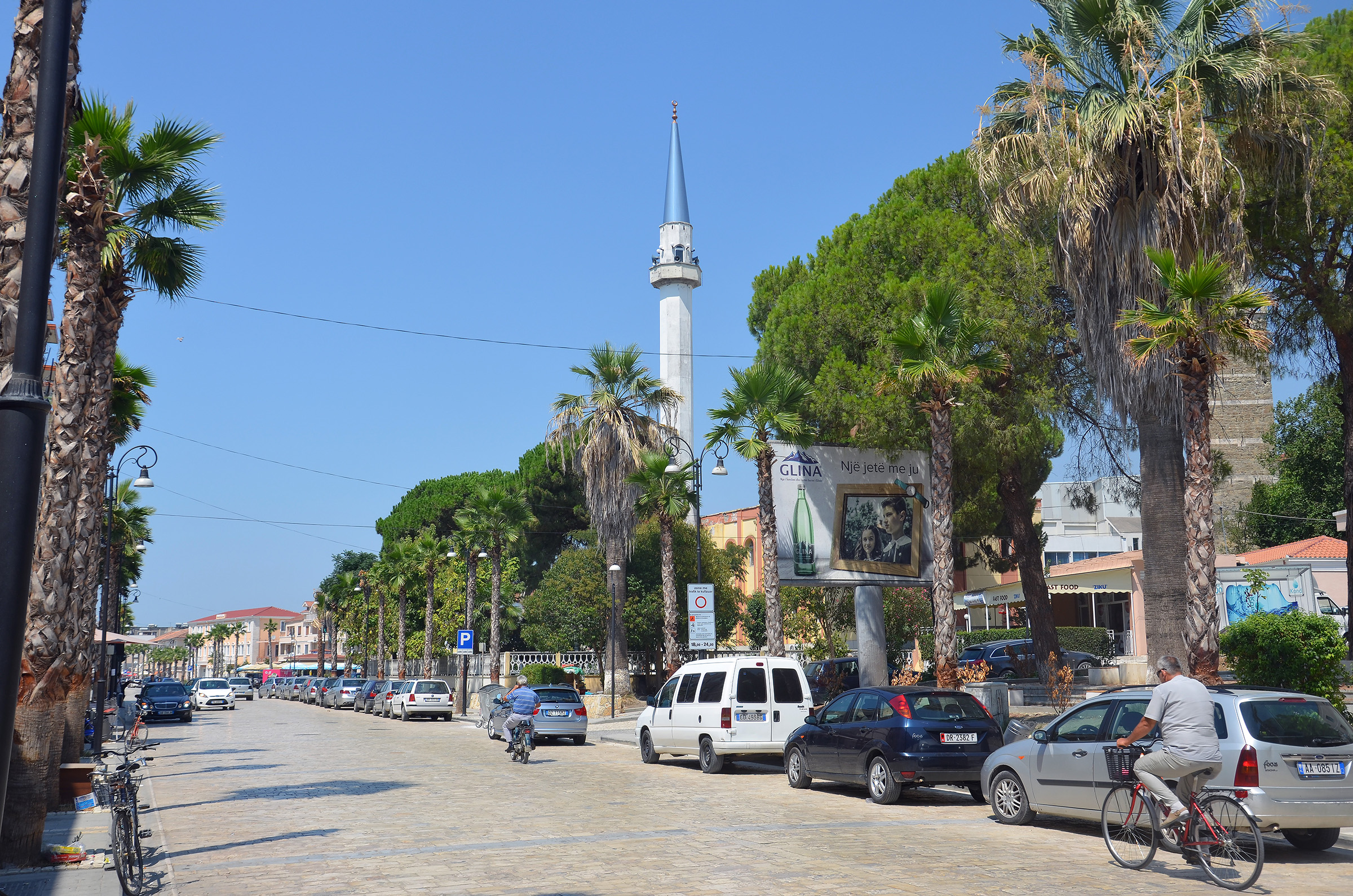
Kavajë

Tirana County is overwhelmingly urban, with more than 70% of its population concentrated in cities, towns and suburbs. There are five incorporated municipalities (bashkia) and 29 administrative units (njësi administrative) in the county. The majority of its population lives in the capital city of Tirana. As of the 2011 Census, the population of the unit stands at 418,495 with the adjacent municipality of Tirana having a population of 557,422 simultaneously constituting the largest metropolitan area in Albania. Other units with a population over 10,000 include Kamëz, Kashar, Paskuqan, Farkë, Kavajë, Dajt and Vorë.

== Economy ==
=== Transport ===
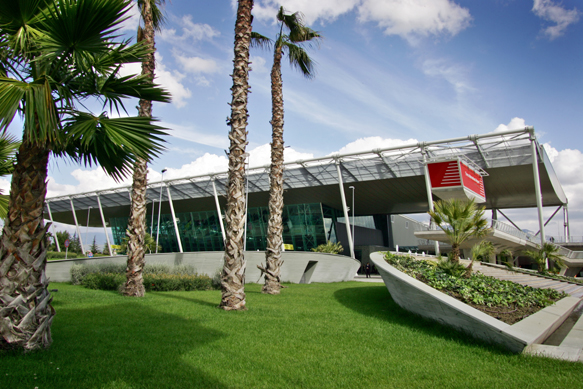
The terminal of Nënë Tereza International Airport

Development and maintenance of transportation in Albania are within the functions of the Ministry of Infrastructure and Energy in Tirana. Other entities, such as the Albanian Aviation Authority (AAC) and Albanian Road Authority (ARRSH), provide the same service for the air and land transportation of the country.

Tirana County is served by Nënë Tereza International Airport located in the village of Rinas. It is named in honor of the Albanian Roman Catholic nun and missionary, Mother Teresa, and offers connections to numerous destinations in different countries across Europe, Africa and Asia. The airport carried more than 3.3 million passengers in 2019 and serves as the principal hub for the country's flag carrier, Air Albania.

The county is connected by a well developed system of expressways and motorways. The main west–east corridor is Rruga Shtetërore 2 (SH2), which connects the country's capital Tirana with the country's second largest city Durrës in Durrës County. The north-south corridor is Rruga Shtetërore 3 (SH3), which is currently being transformed into the Autostrada 3 (A3), covering the distance between Tirana and the country's fourth largest city Elbasan in Elbasan County. Rruga Shtetërore 4 (SH4) passes through Kavajë in the west from north to south linking Durrës with Greece. However, after its completion, the Arbër Highway will connect the county with Dibër County and North Macedonia.

=== Tourism ===
The contribution of tourism to the economy of Tirana has significantly increased over the past years. Tourism in Tirana relies intensively on its natural environment, diversified cultural life and its abundance of religious and historical landmarks. The government of Albania maintains a series of popular protected areas within the territory including, Dajti National Park, Divjakë-Karavasta National Park and the Mali me Gropa-Bizë-Martanesh Protected Landscape.

== See also ==
- Geography of Albania
- Politics of Albania
- Divisions of Albania
