= Dexaroi =

Ancient Greek tribe of Epirus

The Dexaroi (Ancient Greek: Δεξάροι) were an ancient Chaonian tribe living under Mount Amyron. In ancient literature the Dexari are mentioned only by the ancient Greek writer Hecataeus of Miletus (6th century BC), cited by Stephanus of Byzantium (6th century AD). The Dexaroi were the northernmost tribe that belonged to the Chaonian group, one of the three major North-Western Greek-speaking tribes of Epirus.

Mount Amyron has been identified by some modern scholars with Mount Tomorr, in present-day Albania. The mountain was probably located in a region that in Roman times was called Dassaretis. The Dexaroi have been supposedly equated with the Dassaretii by some scholars, hence they are also referred to as Dassaretae in some modern sources. However, all these hypothetical connections remain uncertain.

== Name ==
The name "Dexari" is mentioned only in a fragment of ancient Greek writer Hecataeus of Miletus (6th century BC) writing his Geography of the World, in which he showed a detailed knowledge of the region of Epirus and surrounding areas. This fragment has been preserved in an excerpt from the toponymic dictionary Ethnica (Εθνικά) by Stephanus of Byzantium (6th century AD), under the heading "Δέξαροι". The fragment stated that the Dexari, a tribe of the Chaones, were adjacent to the Enchelei:

"Δέξαροι, ἔθνος Χαόνων, τοῖς Ἐγχελέαις προσεχεῖς, Ἑκαταῖος Εὐρώπῃ. ὑπὸ Ἄμυρον ὄρος οἰκοῦν."

— Stephanus of Byzantium: Ethnica (Fragment 73 FHG i 103 F Gr Hist.).
Translation:

"The Dexari, a Chaonian people neighbouring upon the Enchelei, as is stated by Hecataeus in his book about Europe, who lived under Mount Amyron."

— Šašel Kos (1993): "Cadmus and Harmonia in Illyria", p. 118.

They are most probably also mentioned in a 5th-4th century BC inscription in Dodona as Δεξαιρεᾶται Dexaireatai. In the Periplus of Pseudo-Scylax (4th century BC) some scholars have corrected Καρία Karia with Δεξαρία Dexaria, thus introducing a toponym that is derived from the ethnonym Dexaroi, hapax in Hecataeus' fragment.

Some scholars (Hammond, Wilkes, Weber) consider the Dexari mentioned by Hetataeus in the 6th century BC the same people as the Dassaretae mentioned in Roman times, other scholars (Kunstman and Thiergen, Winnifrith, Eichner, Campbell) consider them two distinct tribes. The best sources provided by ancient authors for the name Dassaretae date to the period of Roman conquest, during the years between the first Roman raid into Illyricum in 228 BC and the Roman settlement of 167 BC. Whether or not they were same tribe still represents a significant and insufficiently answered question.

According to Kunstmann and Thiergen, the tribal name Dexar-, like Dessar- / Dassar-, contains the Illyrian root *daksa/dassa ("water, sea"), since in Illyrian the x/ks (ξ) is phonetically equivalent with ss (σσ). In both tribal names the same root is attached to the suffix -ar. The term δάξα, daksa, was also recorded by Hesychius as an Epirote word meaning sea. It resembles the Illyrian personal names Dazos and Dassius and is also reflected in the toponym of Daksa island and the river Ardaxanos, which is mentioned by Polybius (2nd century BC) in the hinterland of modern Durrës and Lezhë. Weber states that the name Dassaretae is Illyrian and that it shares the same root with the name Dexari. According to N. G. L. Hammond, the Dexari are an archaic form of the later mentioned Dassaretii. Keramopoullos (1953) argues the name Dassaretae is connected to Greek: Διός όρος-ορείται (Dios oros-oreitai, "Mountain of Zeus").

== Geography ==
The Dexaroi are mentioned as dwelling under mount Amyron, near the Enchelei. The mountain has been identified by some modern scholars with Mount Tomorr, in present-day Albania. The mountain was probably located in a region that in Roman times was called Dassaretis. However, all these hypothetical connections remain uncertain.

N. G. L. Hammond reconstructed for the period from the 6th century BC a vast northern dominion of the Chaonians in an area which expanded form the Bay of Vlorë in the south to the Korçë Plain in the north and the lakeland area in the east. In particular Hammond located the Dexaroi in a region that stretched from mount Amyron (Tomorr) up to the southern coast of lake Lychnitis (Lake Ohrid). He further conjectured that the burials of Tumulis II in Kuç i zi in the Korçe-Maliq plain belonged to Dexaroi leaders. Hammond's hypothesis is based on an information provided by Hecataeus, according to which Chaonians and Enchelei were neighboring peoples, and on the appearance of some 6th century BC tumuli in the Korça basin containing the burials of new rulers, who are considered Chaonians by Hammond. However the archaeological evidence is far from certain, since there are no elements of connection between Chaonians and these new rulers, and the same consideration can be made for the historical source, especially taking into account the fact that the knowledge about the Chaonian tribe of the Dexaroi is limited to the single fragment of Hecataeus.

Wilkes (1991) equates the Dexaroi with the Roman times Dassaretae and states that their cities were Pellion, Antipatrea, Chrysondyon, Gertus (or Gerous), Creonion. Hecataeus mentions the Dexaroi dwelling around Korçë. In their east/southeast they bordered with the Orestae tribe of the Molossian group. The precise border on the east of the Dassaretae can't precisely be drawn: some scholars place it at the Tsangon pass, while others at the lake Maliq, near Korce. The regions of Chaonia and Parrhaeuaea were located on their southern border.

== History ==
The Dexaroi were probably neighboring to the north various Illyrian tribes when the latter would have started raiding the Chaonian lands possibly from c. 900 BC, weakening the Chaonian power. The Dexaroi were part of the wider tribal state of the Chaonians during the 6th century BC. At a later period they presumably formed their own independent association.

During the reign of Philip II (359–336 BC) the Macedonians managed to terminate the Dardanian rule in the land of the Dassaretae. As such the Dassaretae became not only independent again but Philip also managed to create a Macedonian buffer zone on their northern border with the Dardanians. The destruction of Pelium in 335 BC by Dardanian Cleitus came probably due to the fact that the local Dassaratean inhabitants were not friendly towards the Dardanian raiders. Macedonian control was re-established in Dassaretis that year and remained as such during the era of Macedonian domination. In 319-317 B.C an Epirote army under Polyperchon and Olympias marched against the local settlement of Euia during their struggle against Cassander of Macedon.

Antipatrea (modern Berat) was founded by the regent of Macedon, Antipater. During the reign of Pyrrhus of Epirus (306–302, 297–272 BC) Dassaretis came possibly into Epirote control. In 217 BC Illyrian Scerdilaidas advanced against Philip V of Macedonia through the region of Pelagonia and the Dassaretian territory capturing Antipatreia, Chrysondyon, and Gertus. As such in 213-212 B.C apart from Dassaretis Philip also campaigned in Illyria, Dardania and Thrace.

== Identity ==
Hammond has argued that before the reign of Philip II of Macedon, Illyrian tribes likely had occupied Dassaretis since no more information about Dexari is recorded and the siege of Pelium (335 B.C) was described as a campaign of Alexander in Illyria. The same scholar proposed the existence of two distinct homonymous tribes, the Illyrian one dwelling between the Dardani and the Ardiaei or next to the Dalmatian coast, and the Chaonian one (equated by him with the Dexari) dwelling between Macedonia and Epirus, since according to Hammond Strabo, Livy and Polybius make a clear distinction between the Dassaretae and the Illyrians. Hammond states that the genealogy of Illyrian tribes recorded by Appian of Alexandria is probably associated with a tribe that lived further north from the Chaonian Dassaretae of the Korce-Maliq region which bore a similar name with the latter. J. J. Wilkes has also equated the Chaonian Dexari with the Dassaretae, who according to Polybius possessed many towns, including Pellion, Antipatrea, Chrysondyon, Gertus (or Gerous), Creonion, Tom Winnifrith (2020) states that the Illyrian tribes, including the Dassareti, bordered on peoples of Epirotic origins and dubious ethnicity like the Molossians and the Chaonians, and the Dassaretae were probably the same as Dexari.

According to Radoslav Katičić (1995) there is no way to rule out the identification of Dexari with Dassareti advocated by Hammond, though it cannot be accepted as reliable. According to him necessary caution should be maintained about the equation of the two tribes. He argues that in later sources of antiquity the Dassareti always appear as Illyrians, while the Chaones are never considered as such, furthermore the Dassareti never intermingle with the Chaones nor are they mentioned as Epirotes. He also states that in Hecataeus' times the situation might have been different, and the information he gathered may not have been reliable at all. A possible Illyrian link of the Dassaretae faces many allegedly impenetrable issues in terms of epigraphic and archaeological evidence. Historian Dragic Danica (2013) concludes that the dominant view in modern historiography accepts the fact that the Dassaretae were counted among the northern Epirote tribes that settled in the northern regions of Epirus including Dassaretis.

Dassaretaean onomastics share similarities with those of ancient Macedonia in particular in the field of names based on divinities from the Greek pantheon, such as Apollodoros.

== See also ==
- Epirus (ancient state)

== Bibliography ==
- Bogdani, Julian (2012). "Genesi urbana e organizzazione del territorio nella Caonia di età classica ed ellenistica". In Enrico Giorgi, Julian Bogdani (ed.). Il territorio di Phoinike in Caonia: archeologia del paesaggio in Albania meridionale. Ante Quem. pp. 355–395. ISBN 9788878490796.
- Campbell, Duncan R. J. (2009). The so-called Galatae, Celts, and Gauls in the Early Hellenistic Balkans and the Attack on Delphi in 280–279 BC (Thesis). University of Leicester.
- Eichner, Heiner (2004). "Illyrisch – die unbekannte Sprache". In Eichner, Heiner (ed.). Die Illyrer. Archäologische Funde des 1. Vorchristlichen Jahrtausends aus Albanien (in German). Museum für Urgeschichte Asparn an der Zaya. pp. 92–117. ISBN 3-85460-215-4.
- Frisone, Flavia (2014). "Sulle tracce del Periegeta. Prospettive, contatti e interazioni nella descrizione dell'Illiria meridionale nelle fonti geografiche greche". In Tagliamonte, Gianluca (ed.). Ricerche archeologiche in Albania: atti dell'Incontro di studi, Cavallino-Lecce, 29-30 aprile 2011. Aracne editrice S.r.l. ISBN 978-88-548-7245-5.
- Hammond, N.G.L. (1981). Ancient Macedonian Studies in Honor of Charles F. Edson. Institute for Balkan Studies.
- Hammond, N. G. L. (1982). "Illyris, Epirus and Macedonia". In Boardman, John; Hammond, Nicholas Geoffrey Lemprière (eds.). The Cambridge Ancient History: The Expansion of the Greek World, Eighth to Sixth Centuries B.C. Vol. III, Part 3 (2nd ed.). Cambridge: Cambridge University Press. pp. 261–285. ISBN 0-521-23447-6.
- Hammond, N. G. L. (1989). "The Illyrian Atintanii, the Epirotic Atintanes and the Roman Protectorate". The Journal of Roman Studies. 79: 11–25. doi:10.2307/301177. ISSN 0075-4358. JSTOR 301177. S2CID 162831458.
- Hammond, N. G. L. (1992). "The Relations of Illyrian Albania with the Greeks and the Romans". In Winnifrith, Tom (ed.). Perspectives on Albania. New York: St. Martin's Press. pp. 29–39. ISBN 9780333512821.
- Hammond, N. G. L. (1993). Collected Studies: Studies Concerning Epirus and Macedonia Before Alexander. Vol. 2. Amsterdam: Adolf M. Hakkert. ISBN 9025610501.
- Hammond, Nicholas Geoffrey Lemprière (1994). "Illyrians and North-West Greeks". In Lewis, David Malcolm; Boardman, John; Hornblower, Simon; Ostwald, M. (eds.). The Cambridge Ancient History: The Fourth Century B.C. Vol. VI. Cambridge: Cambridge University Press. pp. 422–443. ISBN 0-521-23348-8.
- Hammond, N. G. L. (2000). "The Ethne in Epirus and Upper Macedonia". The Annual of the British School at Athens. 95: 345–352. doi:10.1017/S0068245400004718. ISSN 0068-2454. JSTOR 30103439. S2CID 140559037.
- Hammond, N. G. L. (2012). "Chaones". In Hornblower, Simon; Spawforth, Antony; Eidinow, Esther (eds.). The Oxford Classical Dictionary. OUP Oxford. pp. 304–305. ISBN 978-0-19-954556-8.
- Hatzinikolaou, Kalliopi (2007). "Οι λατρείες των Θεών και των Ηρώων στην Ανω Μακεδονία κατά την αρχαιότητα (Ελίμεια, Εορδαία, Ορεστιάδα, Λυγκηστίδα) [The cults of Gods and Heroes in Upper Macedonia during the antiquity (Elimeia, Eordaia, Orestia, Lyncestis)]". Didaktorika.gr (in Greek). Αριστοτέλειο Πανεπιστήμιο Θεσσαλονίκης (ΑΠΘ). Σχολή Φιλοσοφική. Τμήμα Ιστορίας και Αρχαιολογίας. Τομέας Αρχαιολογίας. doi:10.12681/eadd/21322. hdl:10442/hedi/21322.
- Hatzopoulos, M. B. (1997). Epirus, Four Thousand Years of Greek History and Civilization. Ekdotike Athenon. ISBN 960-213-377-5.
- Proeva, Nade (2006). Nikola Tasić; Cvetan Grozdanov (eds.). The Engelanes / Encheleis and the Golden Mask from the Trebenište Culture. SASA special editions. Belgrade: Serbian Academy of Sciences and Arts, Macedonian Academy of Sciences and Arts. pp. 561–570.
- Kaljanac, Adnan (2010). Juzbašić, Dževad; Katičić, Radoslav; Kurtović, Esad; Govedarica, Blagoje (eds.). "Legenda o Kadmu i problem porijekla Enhelejaca" (PDF). Godišnjak/Jahrbuch. 39. Sarajevo: Akademija Nauka i Umjetnosti Bosne i Hercegovine: 53–79. ISSN 2232-7770. Archived from the original (PDF) on 2015-09-23.
- Katičić, Radoslav (1995). Illyricum mythologicum (in Croatian). Zagreb: Antibarbarus. ISBN 9789536160327.
- Kunstmann, Heinrich; Thiergen, Peter (1987). Beiträge zur Geschichte der Besiedlung Nord- und Mitteldeutschlands mit Balkanslaven (PDF). O. Sagner.
- Šašel Kos, Marjeta (1993). "Cadmus and Harmonia in Illyria". Arheološki Vestnik. 44: 113–136.
- Šašel Kos, Marjeta (2005). Appian and Illyricum. Narodni muzej Slovenije. ISBN 961616936X.
- Hammond, N.G.L. (1997). "Tribal Organization and Communities". Epirus, 4000 Years of Greek History and Civilization. Athens: Ekdotikē Athēnōn. ISBN 960-213-371-6.
- Toynbee, Arnold Joseph (1969). Some problems of Greek history. Oxford University Press. ISBN 9780192152497.
- Weber, R. J. (1989). "The Taulantii and Pirustae in Livy's Version of the Illyrian Settlement of 167 B. C. : The Roman Record of Illyria". In Deroux, Carl (ed.). Studies in Latin Literature and Roman History. Vol. V. Latomus. pp. 66–93. ISBN 978-2-87031-146-2.
- Wilkes, John (1995) [1992]. The Illyrians. Oxford: Blackwell Publishers Limited. ISBN 0-631-19807-5.
- Winnifrith, Tom (2002). Badlands, Borderlands: A History of Northern Epirus/Southern Albania. Duckworth. ISBN 978-0-7156-3201-7.
- Winnifrith, Tom (2020). Nobody's Kingdom: A History of Northern Albania. Signal Books. ISBN 9781909930919.
