= Dassaretae =

The Dassaretae may refer to the:

- Dassaretii, an Illyrian tribe
- Dexaroi, a Chaonian tribe
