= Trebeništa =

Archaeological site in North Macedonia

Coordinates: 41°12′23″N 20°45′18″E

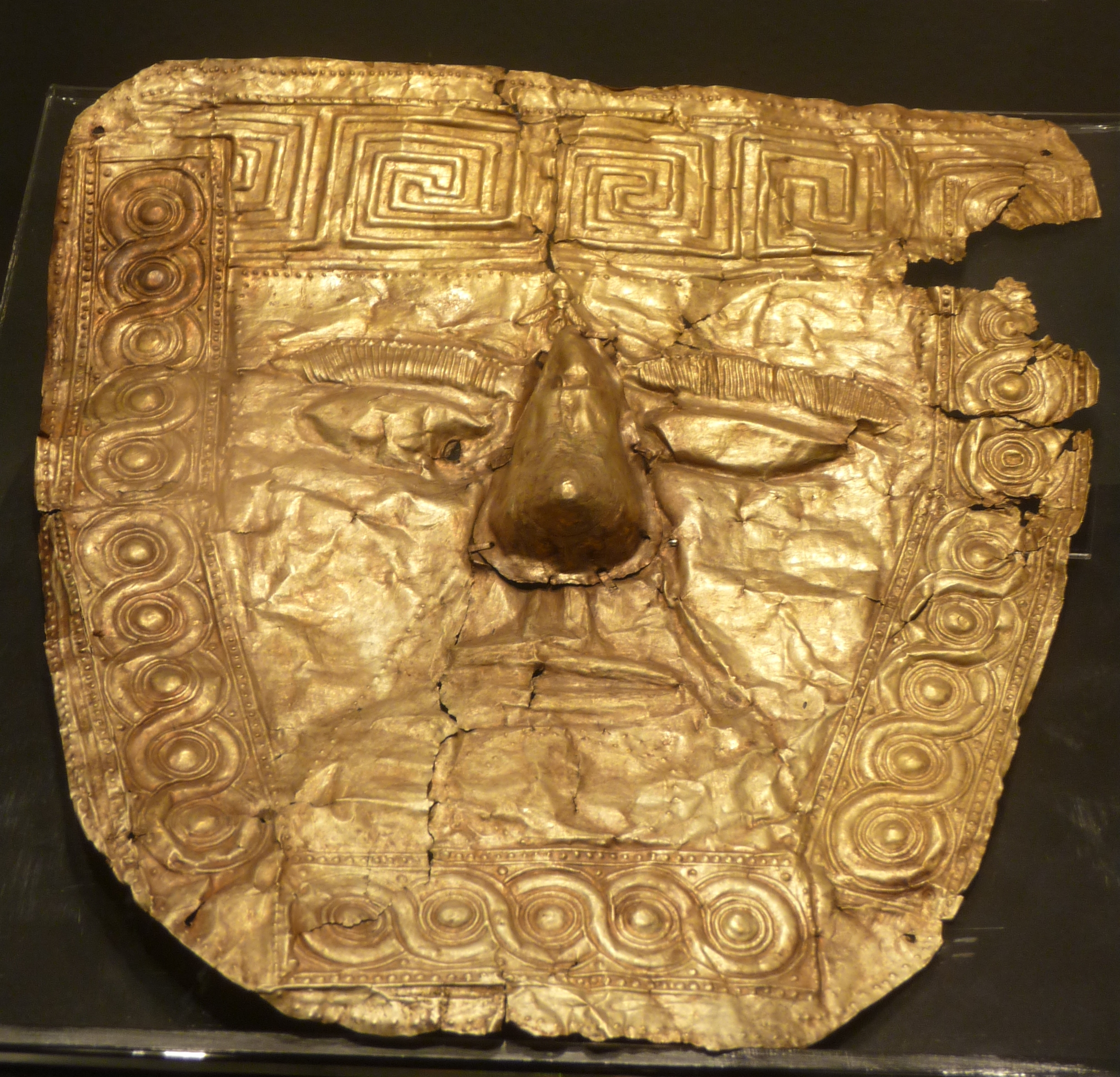
Gold funeral mask found in Trebeništa, 6th century BC

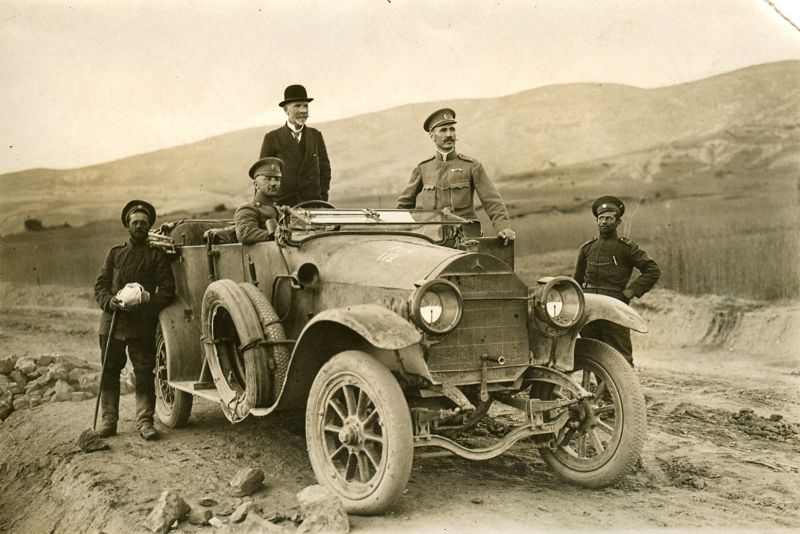
Bulgarian military and administrative personnel at the necropolis in 1918.

Trebeništa (Macedonian: Требеништа) is an ancient necropolis from the Iron Age (around the 7th century BC) southeast Illyria, near the northern shore of Lake Ohrid. The site is located near Trebeništa in modern-day North Macedonia. It is believed that the necropolis was used by the people from the nearby Illyrian town of Lychnidos. They are considered to have been the product of the local Illyrian population, which were attested in later historical sources and Hellenistic epigraphic material to have been the Dassaretii, also identified with the earlier Enchelei, who constituted the oldest known Illyrian kingdom. Some have hypothecised a Thracian influence, or a mixed Balkano-Aegean cultural expression. Archaeological material with gold-riches from the burials at Trebeništa, Aiani on the middle valley of the Haliacmon, and Sindos on the Thermaic Gulf, indicates substantial cultural continuity throughout the wider region, despite the fact that different tribes lived in the various areas of the whole region.

== Modern discovery ==
Trebeništa was discovered by Bulgarian soldiers during World War I Bulgarian occupation of Kingdom of Serbia in 1918. The Bulgarian government sent the archaeologist Karel Škorpil to organize excavations. The artifacts were later researched by the archaeologist Bogdan Filov. Since then, large amounts of graves, five golden masks, and some iron earrings and plates have been found. The excavations continued in 1930-1934, 1953-1954 and 1972 in Yugoslavia. The finds are housed now in the Archaeological Museums in Ohrid, Sofia and Belgrade.

A number of artifacts excavated in the necropolis are said to be imported from ancient Greece while the rest are of a local origin with Greek influences. Archeological findings include a bronze Krater, a Corinthian helmet, Illyrian type helmets and golden funeral masks reminiscent of Aegean culture.

A golden mask from Trebeništa is depicted on the obverse of the 500 Macedonian denar banknote, issued in 1996 and 2003.

== See also ==
- Nikola Vulić

== Bibliography ==
- B.D.Filow, K.Schkorpil, Die archaische Nekropole von Trebenischte am Ochrida-See, Berlin und Leipzig 1927.
- La nécropole archaïque de Trebenischte, Extr. de la Revue Archéo., janvier-avril 1934. Vulic (N.)
- WERE THE AUTHORS OF THE TREBENIŠTE CULTURE AND THE GOLD FUNERAL MASKS, Nade Proeva
- Viktorija Sokolovska, Etnickite nositeli na Trebeniskata Nekropola, Skopje/Ohrid 1997 (Summary in English)
