= Cangonj Pass =

Mountain pass in Albania

- Gryka e Cangonjit
- Location within Albania
- Interactive map of Cangonj Pass

Location
- Location: Cangonj, Korçë County, Albania
- Range: Mount Moravë and Mount Ivan
- Coordinates: 40°41′36.5676″N 20°54′30.495″E

Cangonj Pass (Albanian: Gryka e Cangonjit; Albanian pronunciation: [ɡɾyːka e t͡sanˈɡɔɲit]) is a mountain pass located in the village of Cangonj, Korçë County, southeastern Albania. It is located between Mount Moravë and Mount Ivan south of Lake Prespa, and connects the Korçë Plain in the west with the Poloskë-Bilisht plain in the east. Crossed by the Devoll, the mountain pass was formed through the millennia by the excavating process of the flow of this river.

In classical antiquity the name of the mountain pass was recorded as Tsangon, which was traditionally a border area between Macedon and Illyria, being part of an important east-west communication route.

== History ==
The Tsangon Pass is mentioned by Arrian (2nd century CE) in The Anabasis of Alexander when describing Alexander's campaign in Illyria and the Siege of Pelium, which was waged in 335 BCE by Alexander the Great against Illyrians who revolted under the leadership of Cleitus, son of Bardylis, with the aid of Glaukias king of the Taulantii. This mountain pass controlled one of the only two main west-east routes between Illyria and Macedonia. The other one was the route that became Via Egnatia in Roman times, which was located further north. Alexander undertook his campaign in the Tsangon Pass to take Pelion ensuring the control of his western border, in order to protect Macedonia from Illyrian invasion before setting out for his eastern campaign. The northern route was already controlled by Macedon after Philip II's founding of Herakleia.

The Tsangon Pass was likely used by Roman consul Sulpicius Galba to reach Macedonia from Illyria during the 199 BC military operations he undertook in the Second Macedonian War. Tsangon was a mountain pass that linked the region of Lynkestis to southern Illyria.

In World War II Cangonj was occupied by the advancing Greek forces at the initial stage of the Greco-Italian War (1940-1941).

== Bibliography ==
- King, Carol J. (2017). Ancient Macedonia. Routledge. ISBN 9780415827287.
- Lormier, Dominique (2008). La Guerre Italo-Grecque: 1940-1941 (in French). Calmann-Lévy. ISBN 978-2-7021-4654-5.
- Morton, Jacob Nathan (2017). "Shifting Landscapes, Policies, And Morals: A Topographically Driven Analysis Of The Roman Wars In Greece From 200 Bc To 168 Bc". Publicly Accessible Penn Dissertations. 2484. University of Pennsylvania. Archived from the original on September 17, 2019.
- Oikonomidis, Stavros (2018). "Διασυνοριακές οχυρές θέσειςμεταξύ Μακεδονίας και Ιλλυρίαςκατά την Πρώιμη Εποχή του Σιδήρου" [Fortresses of frontier between Macedonian and Illyria in the Early Iron Age]. Το Αρχαιολογικό Έργο στην Άνω Μακεδονία [To archaiologiko ergo stēn Anō Makedonia] - ΑΕΑΜ 3 (in Greek). A. Ainē: 133–145. ISBN 978-618-81407-3-8. ISSN 2241-0902.
- Papazoglu, Fanula (1988). Les villes de Macédoine à l'époque romaine (in French). Greece: Ecole française d'Athènes. ISBN 9782869580145.
- Weber, R. J. (1989). "The Taulantii and Pirustae in Livy's Version of the Illyrian Settlement of 167 B. C. : The Roman Record of Illyria". In Deroux, Carl (ed.). Studies in Latin Literature and Roman History. Vol. V. Latomus. pp. 66–93. ISBN 978-2-87031-146-2.
- Winnifrith, Tom J. (2002). Badlands-borderlands: a history of Northern Epirus/Southern Albania. London: Duckworth. ISBN 0-7156-3201-9.
- Xholi, Zija; Vejsiu, Ylli (2008). Fjalor enciklopedik shqiptar: H-M [Albanian Encyclopedic Dictionary: H-M]. Fjalor enciklopedik shqiptar (in Albanian). Vol. 2. Akademia e Shkencave e Shqipërisë. ISBN 978-9995610289.
