= Pelion (Illyria) =

Ancient fortified settlement in Illyria

Pelion, also Pellion or Pelium (Ancient Greek: Πήλιον, Πέλλιον or Πήλεον, Latin: Pelion, Pelium or Pellium) was an ancient fortified settlement traditionally located in Illyria, near the Tsangon Pass, on the border with Macedonia. Pelion is generally placed in eastern Dassaretis very close to the historical border with Macedonia, however its precise location is uncertain and various theories have been proposed for the site of the settlement.

Founded either by the Illyrian king Bardylis or by the Macedonian king Philip II, the fortified site of Pelion had been controlled in different periods by the Illyrian kingdom, the Macedonian kingdom, and Rome. Under the Roman rule Pelion was placed in the autonomous administrative unit of Dassaretis, in Epirus Nova and in the Prefecture of Illyricum.

== Name ==
=== Attestation ===
The earliest reference to the settlement is provided by Arrian (Anabasis) mentioning it as Ancient Greek: Πέλλιον, romanized: Pellion when describing the 335 BC Illyrian war of Alexander the Great against Cleitus son of Bardylis and Glaukias, king of the Taulantii. The settlement is mentioned by Polybius (The Histories) as Ancient Greek: Πήλιον, romanized: Pelion and Livy (Ab Urbe Condita Libri) as Pelion in their accounts of the Illyrian Wars and Macedonian Wars, describing it as a Dassaretian town. Stephanus of Byzantium (Ethnica) mentions it as Ancient Greek: Πήλιον, romanized: Pelion describing it as a city in Illyria. In the sixth century AD, a fort by the same name (Ancient Greek: Πήλεον, romanized: Peleon) is listed by Procopius (Aed. 4.4.3) among the refortified sites during the reign of Eastern Roman emperor Justinian, in the province Epirus Nova, again within the traditional boundaries of Illyria.

=== Etymology ===
The toponym Pelion (Πήλιον) is Greek.

== History ==
=== Foundation and early period ===
Pelium was probably built either as a walled fortified site by the Illyrian king Bardylis, without being a former settlement of the Macedonian king Philip II, or alternatively it was built by the Macedonian king possibly through expansion and fortification of an already existing settlement of the Dassaretii, thus becoming a Macedonian stronghold in the conquered territory; in the latter case it would have served its purpose as in the Battle of Pelium the Illyrians were delayed such that the battle took place in the vicinity of Pelion and not inside Macedonia proper.

After defeating Bardylis in 358, Philip II had extended his control into the region around the lakes Prespa and Ochrid. Nevertheless, at the time of the battle between Alexander and the coalition of Cleitus and Glaukias, Pelion was in Illyrian territory held by the Dassaretii, while Little Prespa, which was also once part of the territory of the Dassaretii, had been annexed by Philip after defeating Bardylis in 358 BC, becoming a part of Macedonia. Cleitus the Illyrian – a subject king of Macedonia since at least Philip's suppression of an Illyrian revolt in 349 BC – was in that period acting independently and took control of Pelion most likely shortly before Alexander's intervention in 335 BC, as it was the most important fortress in the region. An important mountain pass, Tsangon, was located near Pelion and controlled one of the only two main west–east routes between Illyria and Macedonia. The other one was the route that became Via Egnatia in Roman times, which was located further north. Alexander undertook his campaign in the Tsangon Pass to take Pelion ensuring the control of his western border, in order to protect Macedonia from Illyrian invasion before setting out for his eastern campaign. The northern route was already controlled by Macedon after Philip II's founding of Herakleia. Describing the settlement Arrian uses the word πόλις for Pelion, while Livy uses the word urbs, however nothing can be inferred from their accounts, except that it was a settlement of a certain size with fortifications that could give pause to a Macedonian king.

=== Illyrian-Macedonian conflict (335 BC) ===
In his Balkan campaign of 335 BC Alexander the Great received news that Illyrians were preparing to attack western Macedonia. A revolt was undertaken at Pelion by the Illyrian chieftain Cleitus, aided by Glaukias, king of the Taulantii. The city was already taken by Cleitus when Alexander arrived, but Macedonian arrival prevented Glaukias and Cleitus from joining forces. Macedonians briefly besieged Cleitus, however on the next day Glaukias and his forces arrived taking control of the heights that surrounded the plain of Pelion. Illyrian forces hence trapped Alexander's army between the fortified city and the heights surrounding it. After an unsuccessful attempt to break out and after losing men and his strategic position, Alexander was obliged to turn back closer to the Macedonian border; combining a forced march and a bold maneuver, Alexander make a tactical retreat and crossed the river. After three days, Alexander noticed Illyrian guard relaxation and reckless camping in open ground, so he took advantage of the situation and quietly returned crossing the river again and thereafter annihilating Illyrian forces that were taken by surprise. The rest of Illyrians fled to Glaukias' realm, but they burned Pelion before leaving the battlefield. Subsequently Alexander marched south to deal with a new threat, the Theban uprising.

=== Roman period ===
In the early second century BC, the expanding Roman Republic gained control of the region during the Second Macedonian War. Like Alexander the Great, Roman consul Sulpicius took Pelion in order to secure the Tsangon Pass and the southern route east–west between Macedonia and Illyria, while the northern route had already been under Roman rule since Sulpicious' 199 BC campaign through the allied Parthini's control of the Genusus valley. Therefore, only the Metsovo Pass remained in the hands of the Macedonians for their westwards movements; on the other hand, Macedonians' enemies – Ardiaei and Dardani – prevented their attempt of a more northern route. At Pelion Sulpicius installed a strong garrison as a base to launch attacks into Macedonia, but most likely mainly for defensive purposes against Macedon. During this campaign Sulpicious harassed Dassaretian communities, also pillaging their granaries and foraging their harvest, therefore when returning to winter quarters at Apollonia at the end of his 199 BC campaign, he likely would have avoided passing through the hostile Devoll valley, but rather he would have taken the same route back through the Genusus valley, the same one he took at the beginning of the campaign. After a peace treaty between Rome and Macedon, in 191 BC the Roman consul Marcus Baebius Tamphilus met Philip V of Macedon in the country of the Dassaretii to plan how to stop the invasion of the Selucid king Antiochus III the Great, and in order to invade Thessaly Philip V escorted two distinct Roman contingents through Macedon. Roman control of Pelium should indicate that the country of the Dassaretii was the furthest east area of Roman control.

== Possible locations ==
Classical sources do not provide enough data to determine the precise location of the ancient site of Pelion, and various placements have been proposed in modern scholarship.

In older research Gustav Zippel located Pelion on the Devoll river. W. W. Tarn located it within the traditional boundaries of Macedonia. Fanoula Papazoglou located the settlement deeper in Dassaretis, near modern Korçë, south of Lake Maliq. J. N. Kalleris and Tom Winnifrith accepted a similar solution. Winnifrith, in particular, suggested a site near Ohrid and Prespa, closer to the Tsangon Pass at Zvezve (northwest of Goricë in the Pojan former municipality) in Albania, where an Illyrian walled site was found. Various Albanian archaeologists and historians, notably Neritan Ceka, proposed present-day Selcë e Poshtme, where the monumental royal tombs of the 3rd century BC can be found. N.G.L. Hammond's and C.E. Bosworth's conclusions are highly hypothetical and mutually exclusive. Hamond proposed a site near Goricë, west of the Small Prespa Lake, on the eastern side of the plain of Poloskë-Bilisht in Albania; while Bosworth proposed a location in the region of Eordaea or Lyncus. Already critical of Tarn's and Papazoglu's suggestions, Hammond extremely criticised Bosworth's proposal. Bosworth's proposal has been accepted by few scholars, while Hammond's solution has had a far wider impact.

According to new research carried out by Vujčić (2021), Pelion must be located somewhere to the west or south of Lake Prespa. A placement in Lynchestis or Orestis directly contradicts the historical sources. Bosworth's reconstruction of the events is hard to accept. Also a placement west or north of the Tsangon Pass is not much in agreement with Livy's accounts, hence excluding Papazoglou's and Ceka's solutions. In particular the site of Selcë e Poshtme is too far from the Macedonian border. Vujčić concludes that Zippel and Hammond have correctly identified the wider area of ancient Pelion in the country immediately to the south of the Great Prespa and west of Small Prespa Lake, somewhere in the eastern Dassaretis in Illyria, very close to the historical border with Macedonia. On the other hand the precise location of Pelion is more difficult to establish, and although Hammond's interpretation, which places it in Goricë, is widely accepted, it remains uncertain.

== See also ==
- List of ancient cities in Illyria
- List of cities in ancient Epirus

== Bibliography ==
- Hammond, Nicholas Geoffrey Lemprière; Griffith, Guy Thompson (1972). A history of Macedonia. Clarendon Press. ISBN 978-0-19-814814-2.
- Hatzopoulos, M. B. (2020). Ancient Macedonia. Walter de Gruyter GmbH & Co KG. ISBN 978-3-11-071868-3.
- Howe, T. (2017). "Plain tales from the hills: Illyrian influences on Argead military development". In Müller, S.; Howe, Tim; Bowden, H.; Rollinger, R. (eds.). The History of the Argeads: New Perspectives. Wiesbaden. ISBN 978-3-447-10851-5.
- King, Carol J. (2017). Ancient Macedonia. Routledge. ISBN 978-1-351-71031-2.
- Lane Fox, R. (2011). "Philip of Macedon: Accession, Ambitions, and Self-Presentation". In Lane Fox, R. (ed.). Brill's Companion to Ancient Macedon: Studies in the Archaeology and History of Macedon, 650 BC – 300 AD. Leiden: Brill. pp. 335–366. ISBN 978-90-04-20650-2.
- Morton, Jacob Nathan (2017). "Shifting Landscapes, Policies, And Morals: A Topographically Driven Analysis Of The Roman Wars In Greece From 200 Bc To 168 Bc". Publicly Accessible Penn Dissertations. 2484. University of Pennsylvania. Archived from the original on 17 September 2019.
- Stocker, Sharon R. (2009). Illyrian Apollonia: Toward a New Ktisis and Developmental History of the Colony.
- Vujčić, Nemanja (2021). "The City of Pelion and the Illyrian War of Alexander". Greek, Roman, and Byzantine Studies. 61.
- Winnifrith, Tom J. (2002). Badlands-borderlands: a history of Northern Epirus/Southern Albania. London: Duckworth. ISBN 0-7156-3201-9.
