= Dassaretii =

Illyrian people

The Dassaretii (Note: The Dassaretii are alternatively known as Dassaretes, Dassaretae, Dassaretai, Dassaretioi or Dassareti) (Ancient Greek: Δασσαρῆται, Δασσαρήτιοι, Dassaretai, Dassaretioi; Latin: Dassaretae, Dassaretii) were an Illyrian people that lived in the inlands of southern Illyria, between present-day south-eastern Albania and south-western North Macedonia. Their territory included the entire region between the rivers Asamus and Eordaicus (whose union forms the Apsus), the plateau of Korça locked by the fortress of Pelion and, towards the north it extended to Lake Lychnidus up to the Black Drin. They were directly in contact with the regions of Orestis and Lynkestis of Upper Macedonia. Their chief city was Lychnidos, located on the edge of the lake of the same name. One of the most important settlements in their territory was established at Selcë e Poshtme near the western shore of Lake Lychnidus, where the Illyrian Royal Tombs were built.

The Dassaretii were one of the most prominent peoples of southern Illyria, forming an ethnic state. They made up the ancient Illyrian kingdom that was established in this region. The weakening of the kingdom of the Enchelei presumably led to the Enchelei's assimilation and inclusion into a newly established Illyrian realm at the latest in the 6th–5th centuries BC, marking the arising of the Dassaretii, who appear to have replaced the Enchelei in the lakeland area.

Most scholars hold that the Illyrian kingdom that was established in the early 4th century BC by the first attested Illyrian ruler – Bardylis – was centered along Lake Ohrid and east to the Prespa Lakes, which was called Dassaretis or Dassaretia later in Roman times, located on the border between Macedon and Epirus. Although Ohrid and Prespa are usually called "Dassaretan Lakes", only Ohrid remained part of Dassaretan territory, while the region of Prespa became part of Macedon when Philip II annexed it after his victories against the Illyrians.

During a campaign in Illyria in 335 BC, Alexander the Great undertook a victorious siege at Pelion, in Dassaretis, against Illyrians who revolted under the leadership of Cleitus, son of Bardylis, with the aid of Glaucias, king of the Taulantii. Bardylis II, who reigned in the early 3rd century BC and who is presumably considered Cleitus' son, might have succeeded Glaucias on the throne as the grandson of Bardylis, or alternatively he might have reigned independently after his father Cleitus somewhere in Dassaretia, in an area located nearer the Macedonian border.

From the 3rd century BC onwards the Dassaretii have been attested as one of the largest Illyrian tribes of the region, and in different periods they changed their rulers, being alternatively under the Illyrian (Ardiaean/Labeatan) kingdom, the Madedonian kingdom and the Roman Republic. In Hellenistic times the Dassaretii minted coins bearing the inscription of their ethnicon. As Roman allies, in 167 BC the Romans declared Dassaretii and their region Dassaretia independent. Dassaretia remained part of the Roman protectorate in southern Illyricum outside the borders of Macedonia. From the middle of the 2nd century BC Dassaretia was included in the Roman province of Macedonia. The Dassaretii established autonomous political entities under the Roman protectorate. Centered at Lychnidus, Roman era inscriptions indicate that Dassaretia was an administrative unit with its own magistrates.

== Name ==
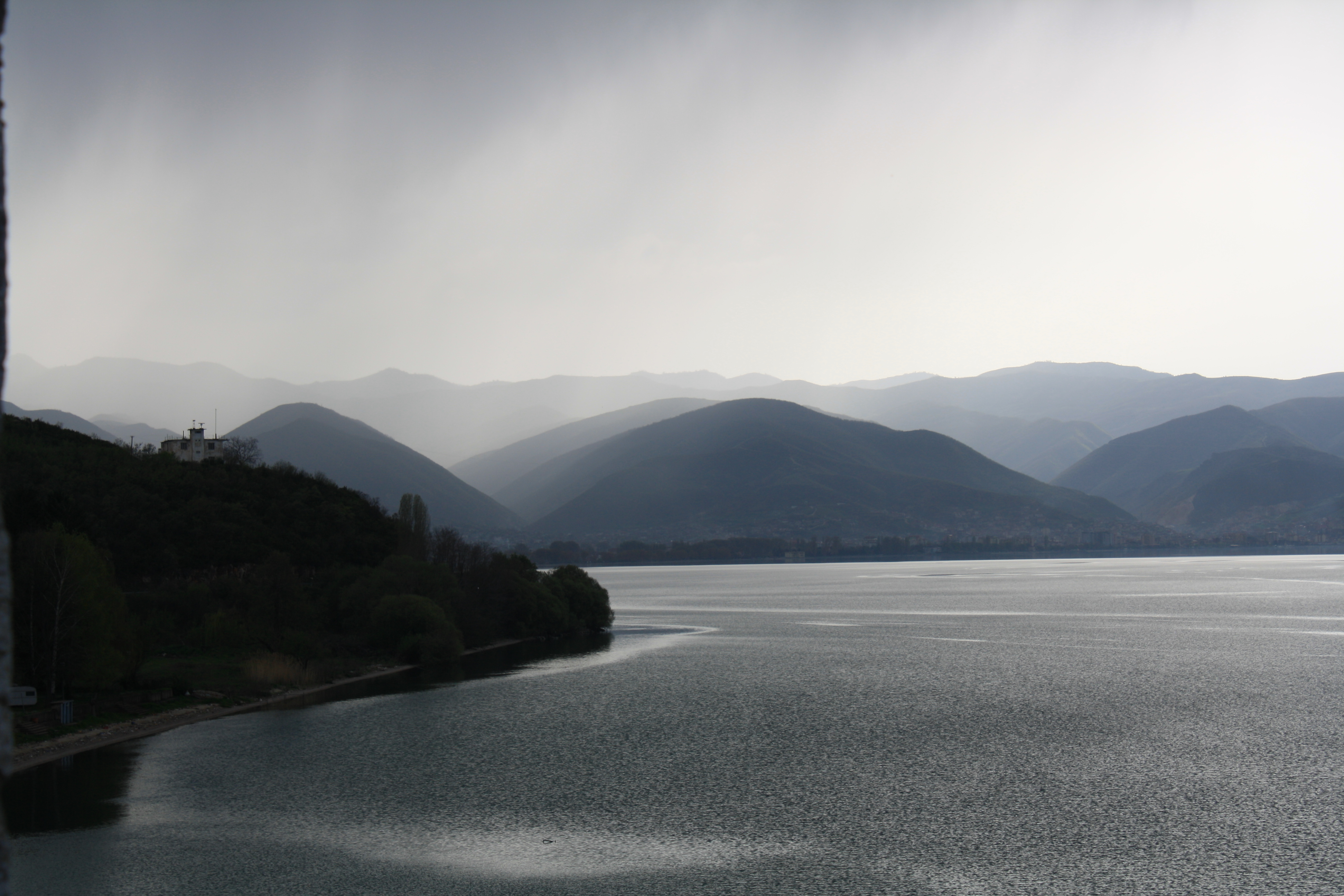
View of Lake Ohrid, one of the bodies of water that are usually called "Dassaretan Lakes".

The tribal name Dassaret- is of Illyrian origin, stemming from Illyrian *daksa/dassa ("water, sea") attached to the suffix -ar. It is related to Illyrian personal names Dazos and Dassius and is also reflected in the toponym of Daksa island and the river Ardaxanos, which is mentioned by Polybius (2nd century BC) in the hinterland of modern Durrës and Lezhë. The name Dassaret- appears relatively late in ancient literature, being mentioned for the first time around 200 BC.

The tribal name Sesarethioi (or Sesarethii), mentioned for the first time by Hecataeus (6th century BC) as an Illyrian tribe holding the city of Sesarethus in the territory of the Illyrian people of Taulantioi, is very close to Dassaretioi. The variant Sesarethioi is also mentioned by Strabo (1st century BC – 1st century AD) as an alternative name for the Enchelei. It has been suggested either that the name Sesarethii can't be considered as another name for the Enchelei (another tribe mentioned by Hecataeus as living to the north of the Chaones), or that Dassaretii were probably known to the Greeks with the name Encheleoi, while their original name in Illyrian would have been Sesarethioi, indicating therefore a connection between them.

The name Dexaroi, mentioned by Hecataeus as a Chaonian tribe adjacent to the Enchelei, has likely the same root as the Illyrian Dassaretii. The hypothesis that equates the Dexaroi with the Dassaretii still remains uncertain. According to a mythological tradition reported by Appian (2nd century AD), the Dassaretii were among the South-Illyrian tribes that took their names from the first generation of the descendants of Illyrius, the eponymous ancestor of all the Illyrian peoples. The Illyrian Dassaretii are often mentioned by Polybius (The Histories) and Livy (Ab Urbe Condita Libri) in their accounts of the Illyrian Wars and Macedonian Wars. They are also mentioned by Strabo (Geographica. VII. p. 316), Appian (Illyrike. 1), Pomponius Mela (De situ orbis libri III. II. 3), Pliny (Natural History. III. 23), Ptolemy (Geography. p. 83) and Stephanus of Byzantium (Ethnica. "Δασσαρῆται"). Their name appears also on coins of the Hellenistic period bearing the inscription ΔΑΣΣΑΡΗΤΙΩΝ, attesting their presence in the Lychnidus area.

== Geography ==
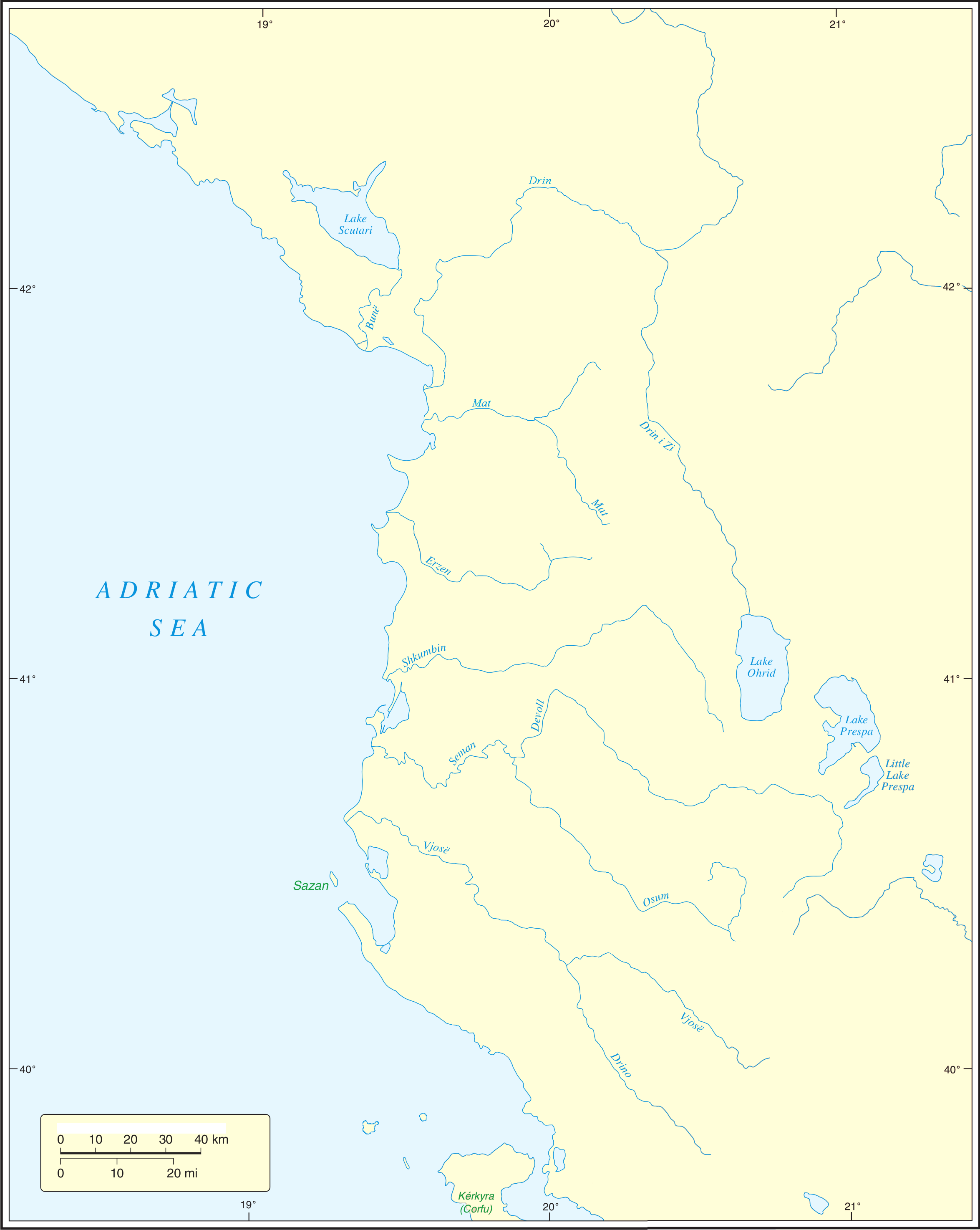

The territory inhabited by the Dassaretii – Dassaretis or Dassaretia – has been documented in literary sources dating from the Roman period. It was a central area of southern Illyria, directly in contact with the regions of Orestis and Lynkestis of Upper Macedonia. The Dassaretii were located between the tribes of Parthini (who dwelled in the Shkumbin valley) and Atintanes (who inhabited in the mountain ranges between Asamus and Aous rivers). The extent of the territory of Dassaretii seems to have been considerable, since it included the entire region between the rivers Asamus and Eordaicus (whose union forms the Apsus), the plateau of Korça locked by the fortress of Pelion and, towards the north it extended to Lake Lychnidus up to the city of the same name.

Although Lake Ohrid and Lake Prespa are usually called "Dassaretan Lakes", only Ohrid remained part of Dassaretan territory, while the region of Prespa became part of Macedon when Philip II annexed it after his victories against the Illyrians. Upper Prespa was on the borderland between the Dassaretan tribes and the Paeones, who were located to the north-east of the lakes, while Lower Prespa was part of the Orestae. The inhabitants of the settlements that were concentrated in Upper Prespa have been under the dominion of the Dassaretan tribal confederation prior to being completely integrated into the Kingdom of Macedon.

Livy (1st century BC) reports that following the victory of 167, the Roman Senate decided to give freedom to "Issenses et Taulantios, Dassaretiorum Pirustas, Rhizonitas, Olciniatas", rewarded because they abandoned the Illyrian kingdom of Gentius a little before his defeat. For a similar reason Daorsi too gained immunitas, while half of the tax had to be paid by "Scodrensibus et Dassarensibus et Selepitanis ceterisque Illyriis" ("the inhabitants of Scodra, Dassarenses and Seleptani, as well as by other Illyrians"). Some scholars have suggested that Livy's material follows exclusively Polybius (2nd century BC). However, it is contradicted by the fact that Lyvian texts reports Illyrian toponyms and ethnonyms principally located in the core of the Illyrian kingdom (Ardiaean–Labeatan dynasty), north of Via Egnatia, except for Taulantii and Dassaretii, a situation different from that of the 2nd century BC. An evident relation between the Pirustae and Dassaretii appears in the text, but the Pirustae are thought to have been located much further north of Dassaretii. This could be explained by the possibility that the Pirustae had various locations in different periods, by the existence of two tribes with the same name or similar names, or by an unknown and hypothetical expansion of the Dassaretii to the north.

=== Settlements ===
The capital of the Illyrian tribe of Dassaretii was Lychnidos, a city located on the edge of the lake of the same name. Polybius mentions Pelion, Antipatreia, Chrysondyon, Gertous and Creonion as Dassaretan cities in the 2nd century BC. The precise location seems to have been found however only for Antipatreia, identified with modern Berat. The settlement of Hija e Korbit in the Korça plain at the Devoll river (ancient Eordaicus) had been probably one of the relevant commercial and military sites of the Illyrian Dassaretii. One of the most prominent settlements in the region of Illyrian Dassaretii was established at Selcë e Poshtme, where the Illyrian Royal Tombs were built.

== Culture ==
=== Language ===
The idiom spoken by the Dassaretii is included in the southern Illyrian onomastic province in modern linguistics. The territory they inhabited belongs to the area that is considered in current scholarship as the linguistic core of Illyrian. It has been suggested that the zone located to the south and west of the Dassareti, Parthini and Taulanti, before reaching the Chaones and Atintanes, was a mixed area generally considered as a part of Illyria, however it was a cultural extension of Greek-speaking Epirus. The Dassaretii were most likely one of the Illyrian peoples described as bilingual by Strabo. The region assigned by Strabo to this Illyrian tribe was subject to the phenomenon of admixture of Greek and non-Greek elements, the latter occasionally not belonging to Illyrian but to the strata of an earlier population. It has been suggested that there may have been a 'Brygian' substratum or a strong influence by the Brygi, as Dassaretia was one of the regions that was previously inhabited by this Paleo-Balkan people.

=== Religion ===
Several cult-objects with similar features are found in different Illyrian regions, including the territory of the Illyrian tribes of Dassaretii, Labeatae, Daorsi, and comprising also the Iapodes. In particular, a 3rd-century BC silvered bronze belt buckle, found inside the Illyrian Tombs of Selça e Poshtme near the western shore of Lake Lychnidus in Dassaretan territory, depicts a scene of warriors and horsemen in combat, with a giant serpent as a protector totem of one of the horsemen; a very similar belt was found also in the necropolis of Gostilj near the Lake Scutari in the territory of the Labeatae, indicating a common hero-cult practice in those regions. Modern scholars suggest that the iconographic representation of the same mythological event includes the Illyrian cults of the serpent, of Cadmus, and of the horseman, the latter being a common Paleo-Balkan hero.

The cult of Artemis under the epithet Άγρότα, Agrota was practiced in southern Illyria, in particular during the Hellenistic and Roman Imperial times. The worship of Artemis Agrota, "Artemis the Huntress", is considered an Illyrian indigenous cult since it was widespread only in southern Illyria, stretching from the Illyrian Dassaretan territory up to Dalmatia, including also the territory of Apollonia. In later Roman times, the cult of Diana Candaviensis, which has been interpreted as "Artemis the Huntress", was practiced up to the region north of Lake Shkodra (ancient lacus labeatis), including also the territory of the Docleatae.

== Politics ==
=== Illyrian Realm ===
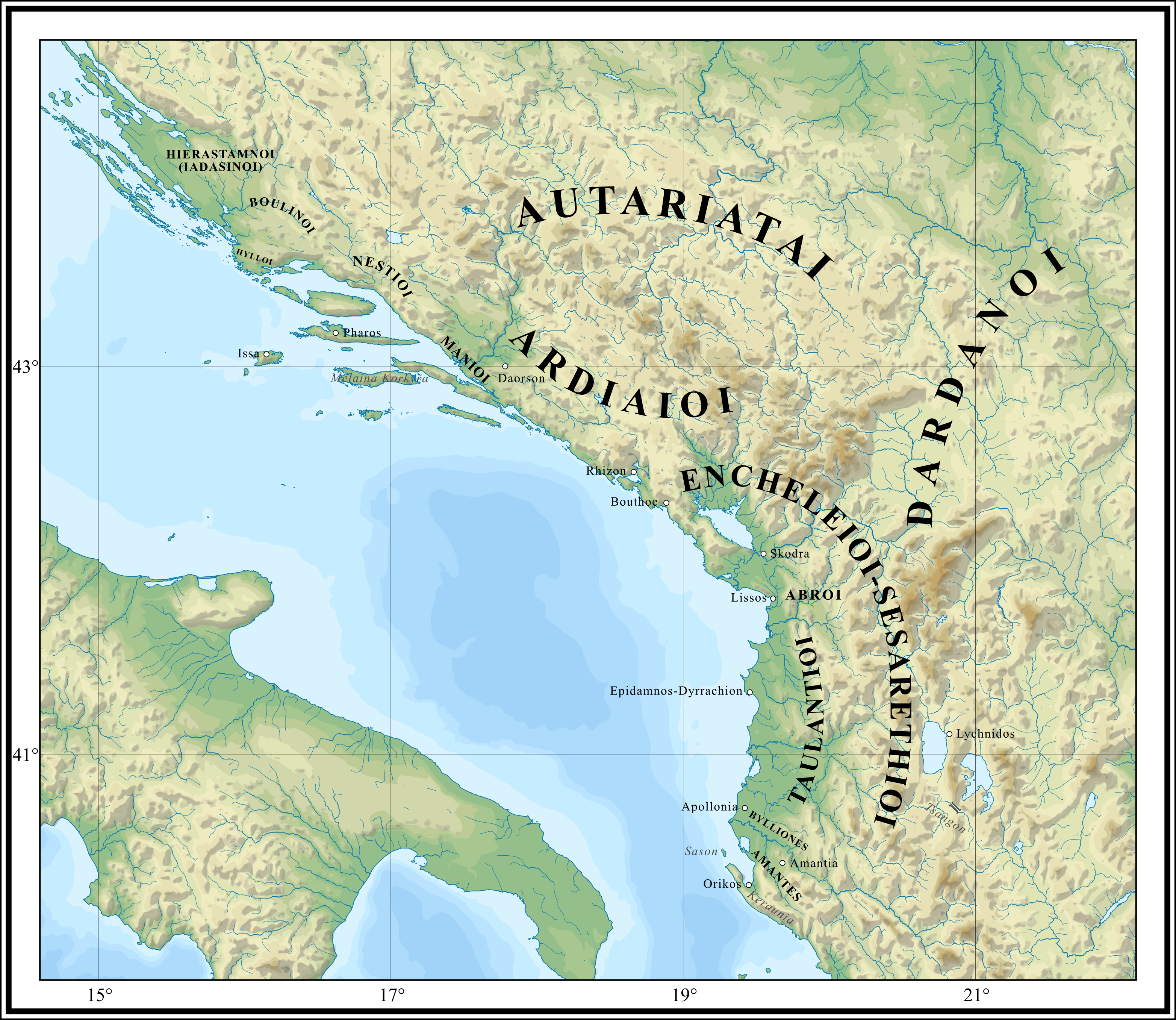
Illyrian tribes in the 7th–4th centuries BCE.

Dassaretii were one of the tribes forming the ancient Illyrian kingdom that was established in the region of southern Illyria. Ancient sources and modern scholars hold that one of the first kingdoms established in this region was that of the Enchelei. It seems that the weakening of the kingdom of Enchelae resulted in their assimilation and inclusion into a newly established Illyrian realm at the latest in the 6th–5th centuries BC, marking the arising of the Dassaretii, who appear to have replaced the Enchelei in the lakeland area (Ohrid and Prespa).

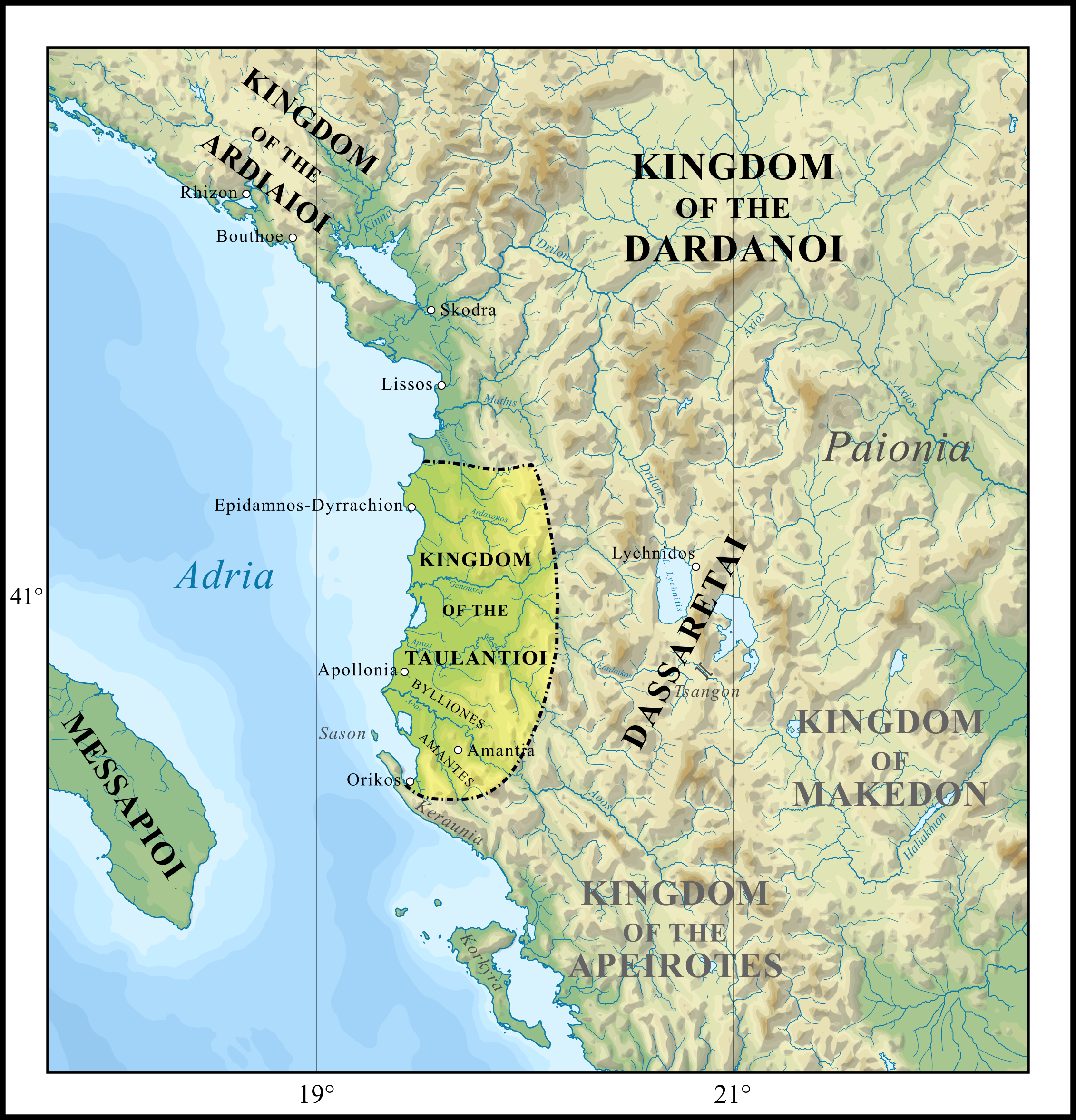
Illyrians after the rise of Macedon.

According to a historical reconstruction, Bardylis founded a powerful Illyrian dynasty among the Dassaretii in the 5th century BC, and established a realm centered in their territory that comprised the area along Lychnidus and east to the Prespa Lakes, which was called "Dassaretis" later in Roman times. (Note: There is also another historical reconstruction that considers Bardylis a Dardanian ruler, who during the expansion of his dominion included the region of Dassaretis in his realm, but this is considered an old fallacy because it is unsupported by any ancient source, while some facts and ancient geographical locations go squarely against it.) A fragment of Callisthenes (c. 360 – 327 BC) which places Bardylis' realm between Molossis and Macedonia, well determines the position of that Illyrian kingdom in the area of Dassaretis. Bardylis' expansion in Upper Macedonia and Molossis, and his son Cleitus' revolt at Pelion in Dassaretis against Alexander the Great make this localization of the core of their realm even more plausible. The exact extension of the kingdom of Bardylis and Cleitus is not known, as it could have included other regions besides Dassaretis.

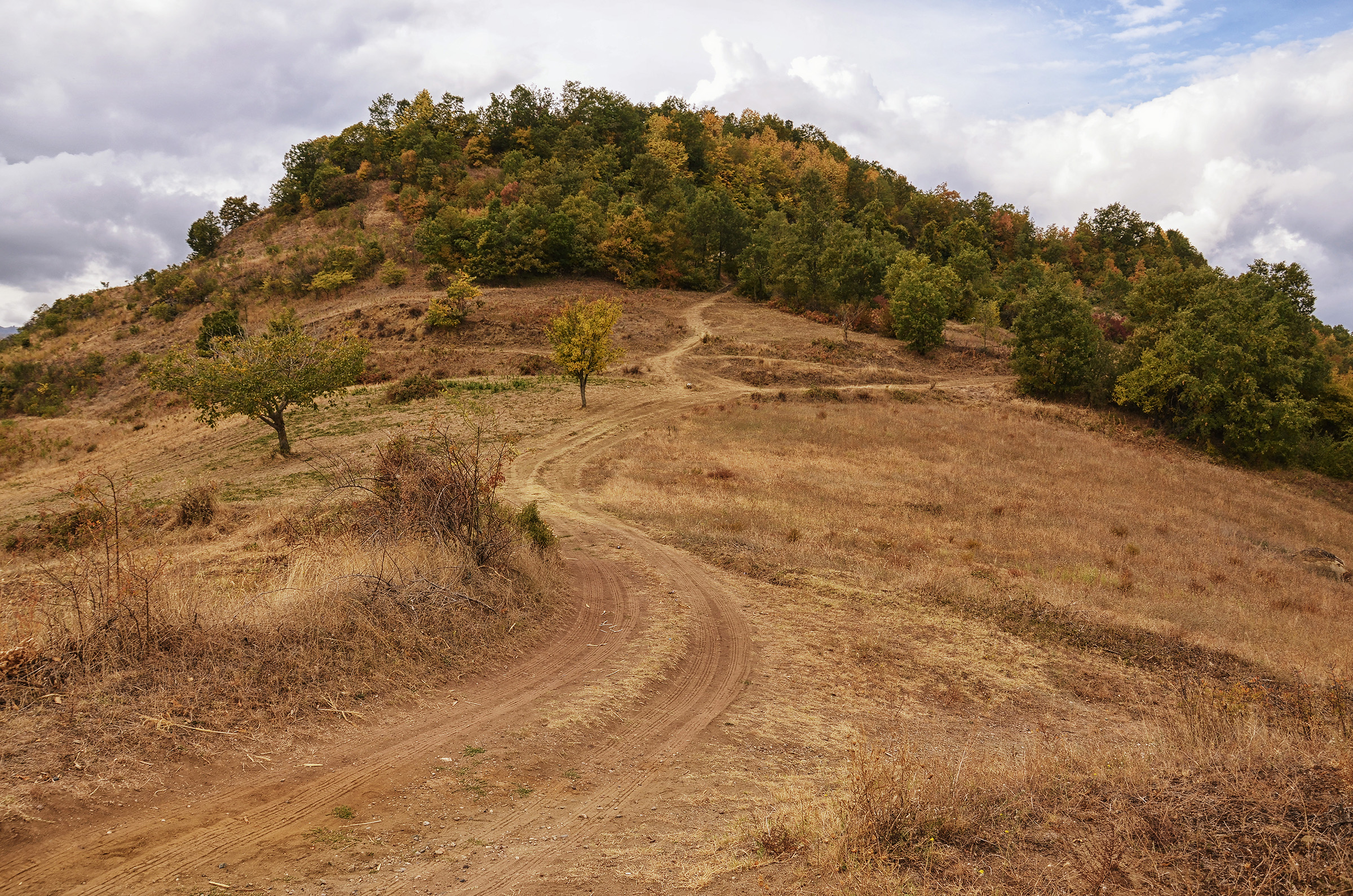
The Illyrian Royal Tombs were built on a hill located in Selca e Poshtme, near the western shore of Lake Ohrid, Albania.

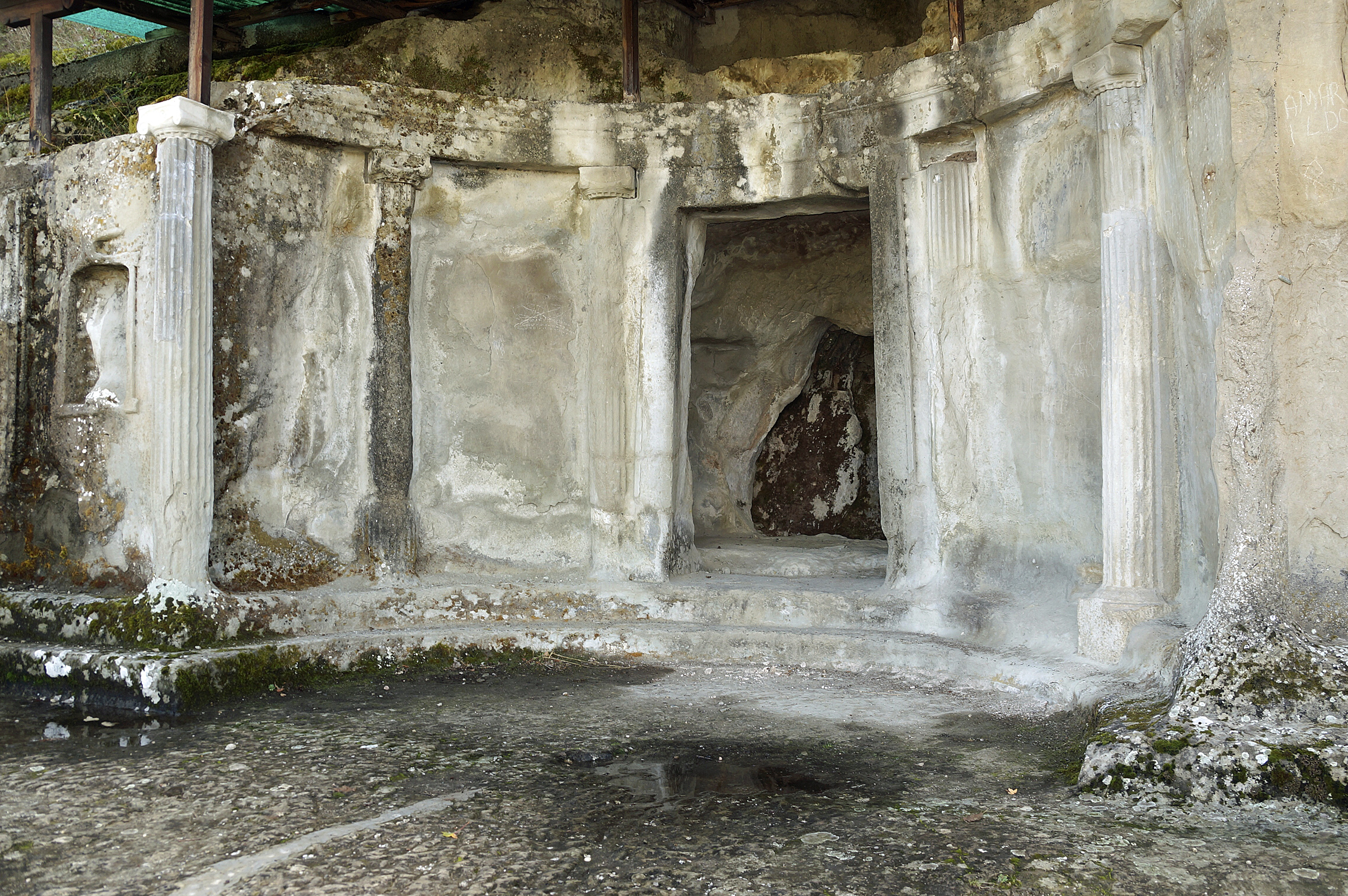
Royal tomb III, Selca e Poshtme.

The establishment of a tribal realm centered in the rich region of the Illyrian Dassaretii seems supported also by numismatic and epigraphic evidence. The Illyrian Royal Tombs of Selca e Poshtme are located in the Illyrian Dassaretan region. The site of Selcë was in the past a flourishing economical centre more developed than the surroundings because it occupied a predominant position inside the region currently called Mokër, and because it controlled the road which led from the Adriatic coasts of Illyria to Macedonia.

A helmet reporting the inscription of the name of the Illyrian king Monunius was found in the area of lake Lychnidus in the territory of the Illyrian tribe of Dassaretii. It has been interpreted as a possible component of the equipment of a royal special force, suggesting also a financial activity of this king. Dating back to the 3rd century BC, the inscriptions of Monunius are considered the oldest known in the area.

Before the year 229 the Illyrian tribe of Dassaretii had been under the rule of the Illyrian kingdom of the Ardiaei, and they controlled the mountain passes eastwards over the Pindus on the border with Macedon. The retreat to the north and in later times the destruction of the Illyrian kingdom highlighted numerous communities in southern Illyria – including the Dassaretii – that were organized in koina, as evidenced by historical sources, coins and epigraphic material.

==== Illyrian dynasty ====
The following is a list of the members of Bardylis' Illyrian dynasty recorded as such in ancient sources, whose realm was centered in the territory of the Dassaretii as claimed by a number of modern scholars:

- Bardylis I (c. 448 – 358 BC)
- Cleitus (fl. c. 335 BC), son of Bardylis I
- Bardylis II (fl. c. 300 BC), son of Cleitus

Grabos I (fl. c. 5th century BC) and Grabos II (fl. c. 357 – 356 BC), who most likely was the son of the former, should also have ruled in the same region of southern Illyria, however there are not enough historical elements to determine whether or not they were of the same dynasty as Bardylis I. The same observation applies in the case of Monunius I (fl. c. 280 BC) and Mytilus (fl. c. 270 BC).

=== Roman times institutions ===
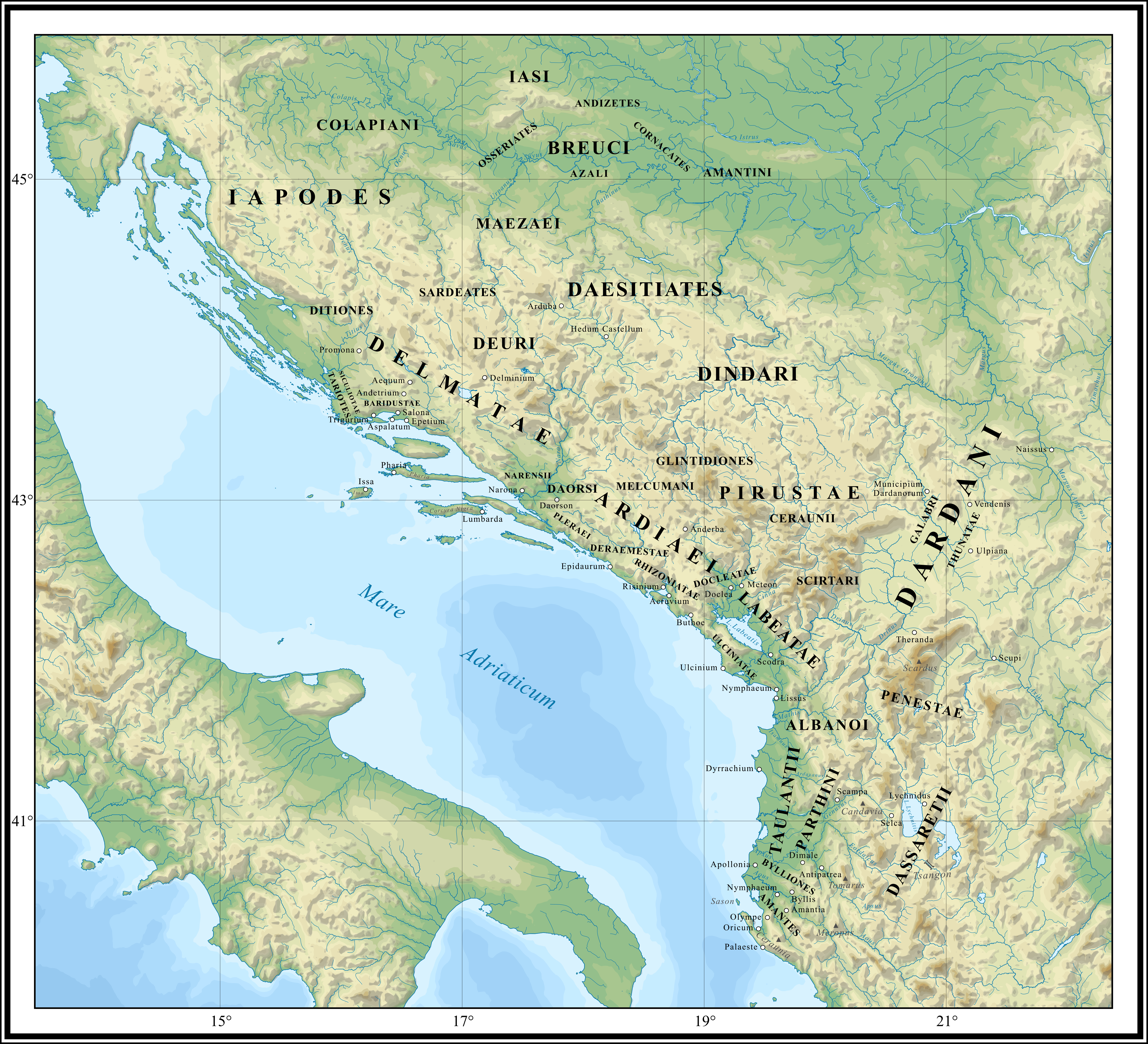
Illyrian tribes in the 1st-2nd centuries CE.

Ancient historian Polybius (fl. 2nd century BC) describes peoples of Illyria, like the Dassaretae and the Ardiaei, using the term ethnos, with the meaning of "tribes" within wider national units. After defeating the Macedonians in 196 BC, Roman consul Titus Quinctius Flamininus assigned to the Illyrian (Labeatan) king Plauratus, son of Skerdilaidas, the regions of the Parthini and Lychnis, which were previously occupied by Philip V of Macedon, and the territory of the Dassaretii was also likely detached from Macedon. Thus, after the Roman campaigns in Macedonia the Dassaretii were declared independent as Roman allies, like the Orestae, and they established autonomous political entities under the Roman protectorate.

The Dassaretioi were mentioned in Imperial times in many inscriptions as either having an executive power or as dedicants. The official of the highest rank was, most likely, the strategos, whose seat seems to have been located in Lychnidos. However, the Dassaretioi were not mentioned in a single inscription together with the polis of Lychnidos. This indicates that from the Hellenistic period they seem to have been separate political entities. It has been suggested that the tribe of Dassaretioi and the city of Lychnidos might have formed some kind of political confederation (similar to a koinon) based on the unification of various tribes or various towns and villages. This type of political organisation were quite widespread in the Balkans during the Classical and Hellenistic periods. Some of these confederations survived until Imperial times, such as that of the Bylliones.

Stephanus of Byzantium (fl. 6th century AD) describes the Dassaretai as an Illyrian ethnos and does not associate them with a city. He seems to have used the term ethnos to describe the Dassaretan community in conformation to Anthony Snodgrass' definition: "In its purest form the ethnos was no more than a survival of the tribal system into historical times: a population scattered thinly over a territory without urban centres, united politically and in customs and religion, normally governed by means of some periodical assembly at a single centre, and worshipping a tribal deity at a common religious centre". Snodgrass presents indeed the ethnos as the prehistoric precursor of the polis describing it "no more than a survival of the tribal system into historical times".

== Economy ==
The region of the Illyrian tribe of Dassaretii bordered the regions of Macedonia and Molossia. Including the valleys of Osum and Devoll rivers, stretching to the east into the Korçë Plain, and comprising the area around lake Ohrid, the Illyrian Dassaretan region was rich in natural resources and was located in a strategic geographical position that aroused the political wishes of the neighbours and the interest of the Greek merchants.

The prosperous site of Selcë was important in the region, because it occupied a prominent military and commercial position being able to control the route which led from the Adriatic coasts of Illyria to Macedonia, hence predominating in the area near Via Egnatia that was established in Roman times following that route. Some of its natural resources were the stone quarries. The area was likely also close to the silver mines of Damastion. The territory of the Dassaretii, which is rich in iron ore, was one of the mining regions of the Illyrians. Evidence for the importance of metals for the Illyrians is provided by a 2nd century CE funerary stele found in Dassaretis, which represents two blacksmiths working metal and constitutes one of a kind case. The Dassaretii minted coins in Hellenistic times. Coins bearing the inscription ΔΑΣΣΑΡΗΤΙΩΝ (DASSARETION) have been found in the region of Lake Lychnidus.

In antiquity, as the authors of that time informs, the Dassaretan territory was known for its very fertile countryside, with a developed agricultural economy. An example is the account about the Roman consul Sulpicius, who during the Second Macedonian War in 199 BC, passed through the territory of the Dasaretii and supplied his army with the products offered by that region, without the resistance of the locals. In Roman times the Dassaretii may have practiced transhumance in southern Illyria.

== Bibliography ==
- Anamali, Skënder (1992). "Santuari di Apollonia". In Stazio, Attilio; Ceccoli, Stefania (eds.). La Magna Grecia e i grandi santuari della madrepatria: atti del trentunesimo Convegno di studi sulla Magna Grecia. Atti del Convegno di studi sulla Magna Grecia (in Italian). Vol. 31. Istituto per la storia e l'archeologia della Magna Grecia. pp. 127–136.
- Buora, Maurizio; Santoro, Sara, eds. (2003). Progetto Durrës L'indagine sui Beni Culturali albanesi dell'antichità e del medioevo: tradizioni di studio a confronto. Atti del primo incontro scientifico (Parma-Udine, 19-20 aprile 2002). Antichità Altoadriatiche - AAAD (in Italian). Vol. LIII. Editreg. ISBN 9788888018126. ISSN 1972-9758.
- Cabanes, Pierre (1988). Les illyriens de Bardulis à Genthios (IVe–IIe siècles avant J.-C.) [The Illyrians from Bardylis to Gentius (4th – 2nd century BC)] (in French). Paris: SEDES. ISBN 2718138416.
- Cabanes, Pierre (2002) [1988]. Dinko Čutura; Bruna Kuntić-Makvić (eds.). Iliri od Bardileja do Gencia (IV. – II. stoljeće prije Krista) [The Illyrians from Bardylis to Gentius (4th – 2nd century BC)] (in Croatian). Translated by Vesna Lisičić. Svitava. ISBN 953-98832-0-2.
- Castiglioni, Maria Paola (2007). "Genealogical Myth and Political Propaganda in Antiquity: the Re-Use of Greek Myths from Dionysius to Augustus". In Carvalho, Joaquim (ed.). Religion and Power in Europe: Conflict and Convergence. Edizioni Plus. ISBN 978-88-8492-464-3.
- Castiglioni, Maria Paola (2010). Cadmos-serpent en Illyrie: itinéraire d'un héros civilisateur. Edizioni Plus. ISBN 9788884927422.
- Castiglioni, Maria Paola (2018). "Les Grecs en Adriatique". Cadernos do Lepaarque. XV (29): 320–339. doi:10.15210/lepaarq.v15i29.11495. ISSN 2316-8412.
- Eichner, Heiner (2004). "Illyrisch – die unbekannte Sprache". In Eichner, Heiner (ed.). Die Illyrer. Archäologische Funde des 1. Vorchristlichen Jahrtausends aus Albanien (in German). Museum für Urgeschichte Asparn an der Zaya. pp. 92–117. ISBN 3-85460-215-4.
- Eckstein, Arthur M. (2008). Rome Enters the Greek East From Anarchy to Hierarchy in the Hellenistic Mediterranean, 230–170 BC. Blackwell Publishing. ISBN 978-1-4051-6072-8.
- Erdkamp, Paul (1998). Hunger and the sword: warfare and food supply in Roman Republican wars (264-30 B.C.). Dutch monographs on ancient history and archaeology. Vol. 20. Gieben. ISBN 978-90-50-63608-7.
- Fasolo, Michele (2009). "La via Egnatia nel territorio della Repubblica di Macedonia". In Cesare Marangio; Giovanni Laudizi (eds.). Παλαιά Φιλία [Palaià Philía]: studi di topografia antica in onore di Giovanni Uggeri. Journal of Ancient Topography - Rivista di Topografia Antica (in Italian). Vol. 4. Mario Congedo editore. pp. 601–612. ISBN 9788880868651.
- Garašanin, Milutin V. (1976). "O problemu starobalkanskog konjanika" [About the Problem of Old Balkan Horseman]. Godišnjak Centra za balkanološka ispitivanja (in Serbo-Croatian). 13. Akademija Nauka i Umjetnosti Bosne i Hercegovine: 273–283.
- Garašanin, Milutin V. (1988). "Formation et origines des Illyriens". In Garašanin, Milutin V. (ed.). Les Illyriens et les Albanais. Classe des Sciences Historiques. Vol. 10. Belgrade: Serbian Academy of Sciences and Arts. pp. 81–144.
- Gavoille, Élisabeth (2019). "Mémoire romaine des Balkans: les images de l'illyrie et de la Dalmatie à travers la littérature latine". Folia Linguistica et Litteraria (29). Institute for Language and Literature, Faculty of Philology, Nikšić: 5–18. doi:10.31902/fll.29.2019.1.
- Gruen, Erich S. (2018). "Polybius and Ethnicity". In Miltsios, Nikos; Tamiolaki, Melina (eds.). Polybius and his Legacy. Walter de Gruyter GmbH & Co KG. pp. 13–34. ISBN 978-3-11-058397-7. ISSN 1868-4785.
- Haebler, Claus (2002). "Palaeo-Balkanic languages". In Hubert, Cancik; Schneider, Helmuth; Salazar, Christine F.; Orton, David E. (eds.). Brill's New Pauly: Ark–Kas. Brill's New Pauly. Vol. 2. Brill. ISBN 9004122656.
- Hatzopoulos, M. B. (1993). "Anthroponymie grecque et non-grecque dans les inscriptions de Dyrrhachion et d'Apollonia". In Cabanes, Pierre (ed.). Grecs et Illyriens dans les inscriptions en langue grecque d'Epidamne-Dyrrhachion et d'Apollonia d'Illyrie: actes de la Table ronde internationale (Clermont-Ferrand, 19-21 octobre 1989). Editions Recherche sur les civilisations. pp. 81–88. ISBN 2865382419.
- Hatzopoulos, M. B. (1997). "The Boundaries of Hellenism in Epirus during Antiquity". In Sakellariou, M. V. (ed.). Ηπειρος: 4000 χρόνια ελληνικής ιστορίας και πολιτισμού. Athens: Ekdotikē Athēnōn. pp. 140–145. ISBN 960-213-371-6.
- Hatzopoulos, M. B. (2020). Ancient Macedonia. Walter de Gruyter GmbH & Co KG. ISBN 978-3-11-071868-3.
- Jaupaj, Lavdosh (2019). Etudes des interactions culturelles en aire Illyro-épirote du VII au III siècle av. J.-C (Thesis). Université de Lyon; Instituti i Arkeologjisë (Albanie).
- Kaljanac, Adnan (2010). Juzbašić, Dževad; Katičić, Radoslav; Kurtović, Esad; Govedarica, Blagoje (eds.). "Legenda o Kadmu i problem porijekla Enhelejaca" (PDF). Godišnjak/Jahrbuch. 39. Sarajevo: Akademija Nauka i Umjetnosti Bosne i Hercegovine: 53–79. ISSN 2232-7770. Archived from the original (PDF) on 2015-09-23.
- Katičić, Radoslav (1995). Illyricum mythologicum (in Croatian). Zagreb: Antibarbarus. ISBN 9789536160327.
- Kunstmann, Heinrich; Thiergen, Peter (1987). Beiträge zur Geschichte der Besiedlung Nord- und Mitteldeutschlands mit Balkanslaven (PDF). O. Sagner.
- Lane Fox, R. (2011). "Philip of Macedon: Accession, Ambitions, and Self-Presentation". In Lane Fox, R. (ed.). Brill's Companion to Ancient Macedon: Studies in the Archaeology and History of Macedon, 650 BC – 300 AD. Leiden: Brill. pp. 335–366. ISBN 978-90-04-20650-2.
- Lippert, Andreas; Matzinger, Joachim (2021). Die Illyrer: Geschichte, Archäologie und Sprache. Kohlhammer Verlag. ISBN 9783170377103.
- McInerney, Jeremy (1999). The Folds of Parnassos, Land and Ethnicity in Ancient Phokis. University of Texas Press. ISBN 978-0-292-76160-5.
- Mesihović, Salmedin (2014). ΙΛΛΥΡΙΚΗ (Ilirike) (in Bosnian). Sarajevo: Filozofski fakultet u Sarajevu. ISBN 978-9958-0311-0-6.
- Mesihović, Salmedin; Šačić, Amra (2015). Historija Ilira [History of Illyrians] (in Bosnian). Sarajevo: Univerzitet u Sarajevu [University of Sarajevo]. ISBN 978-9958-600-65-4.
- Mortensen, Kate (1991). "The Career of Bardylis". The Ancient World. Vol. 22. Ares Publishers. pp. 49–59.
- Palazzo, Silvia (2010). "Ethne e poleis lungo il primo tratto della via Egnatia: la prospettiva di una fonte". In Antonietti, Claudia (ed.). Lo spazio ionico e le comunitàdella Grecia nord-occidentale: Territorio, società, istituzioni (in Italian). Edizioni ETS. pp. 273–290. ISBN 978-884672849-4.
- Papazoglu, Fanula (1978). The Central Balkan Tribes in pre-Roman Times: Triballi, Autariatae, Dardanians, Scordisci and Moesians. Amsterdam: Hakkert. ISBN 9789025607937.
- Papazoglu, Fanula (1988). Les villes de Macédoine à l'époque romaine (in French). Greece: Ecole française d'Athènes. ISBN 9782869580145.
- Pettifer, James; Vickers, Miranda (2021). Lakes and Empires in Macedonian History: Contesting the Waters. Bloomsbury Publishing. ISBN 9781350226142.
- Parisot, Pierrick (2015). Le contrôle de l'espace européen par les rois de Macédoine, des origines à la fin de la monarchie (VIe siècle av. J.-C.–168 av. J.-C.) (Thesis) (in French). Université de Lorraine.
- Picard, Olivier (2013). "Ilirët, kolonitë greke, monedhat dhe lufta". Iliria (in Albanian). 37: 79–97. doi:10.3406/iliri.2013.2428.
- Polomé, Edgar C. (1983). "The Linguistic Situation in the Western Provinces of the Roman Empire". In Wolfgang Haase (ed.). Sprache und Literatur (Sprachen und Schriften [Forts.]). Walter de Gruyter. pp. 509–553. ISBN 3110847035.
- Šašel Kos, Marjeta (1993). "Cadmus and Harmonia in Illyria". Arheološki Vestnik. 44: 113–136.
- Šašel Kos, Marjeta (1997). "Dassaretia". In Hubert, Cancik; Schneider, Helmuth (eds.). Der neue Pauly: Enzyklopädie der Antike. Altertum : Cl-Epi. Vol. 3. Metzler. ISBN 9783476014733.
- Šašel Kos, Marjeta (2002). "Pyrrhus and Illyrian Kingdom(s?)". Greek Influence Along the East Adriatic Coast. Knjiga Mediterana. 26: 101–119. ISBN 9531631549.
- Šašel Kos, Marjeta (2004). "Mythological stories concerning Illyria and its name". In P. Cabanes; J.-L. Lamboley (eds.). L'Illyrie méridionale et l'Epire dans l'Antiquité. Vol. 4. pp. 493–504.
- Šašel Kos, Marjeta (2005a). Appian and Illyricum. Narodni muzej Slovenije. ISBN 961616936X.
- Šašel Kos, Marjeta (2005b). "Lychnidus". In Hubert, Cancik; Schneider, Helmuth; Salazar, Christine F. (eds.). Brill's New Pauly, Antiquity, Volume 7 (K-Lyc). Brill's New Pauly. Vol. 7. Brill. ISBN 9004122702.
- Shehi, Eduard (2023). "Archaic, Classical, and Roman Pottery". In Galaty, Michael L.; Bejko, Lorenc (eds.). Archaeological Investigations in a Northern Albanian Province: Results of the Projekti Arkeologjik i Shkodrës (PASH): Volume Two: Artifacts and Artifact Analysis. Memoirs Series. Vol. 64. University of Michigan Press. ISBN 9781951538699.
- Shpuza, Saïmir (2009). "Aspekte të ekonomisë antike ilire dhe epirote / Aspects of Ancient Illyrian and Epirotic Economy". Iliria. 34: 91–110. doi:10.3406/iliri.2009.1083.
- Shpuza, Saimir (2022). La Romanisation de l'Illyrie méridionale et de la Chaônie. Collection de l'École française de Rome. Publications de l'École française de Rome. ISBN 9782728310982.
- Siewert, Peter (2003). "Politische Organisationsformen im vorrömischen Südillyrien". In Urso, Gianpaolo (ed.). Dall'Adriatico al Danubio: l'Illirico nell'età greca e romana : atti del convegno internazionale, Cividale del Friuli, 25-27 settembre 2003. I convegni della Fondazione Niccolò Canussio (in German). ETS. pp. 53–62. ISBN 884671069X.
- Stocker, Sharon R. (2009). Illyrian Apollonia: Toward a New Ktisis and Developmental History of the Colony.
- Stipčević, Aleksandar (1989). "Topografija ilirskih plemena" [Topography of Illyrian tribes]. Iliri: povijest, život, kultura [The Illyrians: history and culture] (in Croatian). Školska knjiga. ISBN 9788603991062.
- Theodossiev, Nikola (1998). "The dead with golden faces: Dasaretian, Pelagonian, Mygdonian and Boeotian funeral masks". Oxford Journal of Archaeology. 17 (3). Blackwell Publishing: 345–367. doi:10.1111/1468-0092.00067.
- Toynbee, Arnold Joseph (1969). Some problems of Greek history. Oxford University Press. ISBN 9780192152497.
- Ujes, Dubravka (2002). "Recherche sur la localisation de Damastion et ses mines". Revue numismatique. 6th. 6 (158): 103–129. doi:10.3406/numi.2002.1438.
- Verčík, Marek; Kerschbaum, Saskia; Tušlová, Petra; Jančovič, Marián; Donev, Damjan; Ardjanliev, Pero (2019). "Settlement Organisation In The Ohrid Region". Studia Hercynia (XXIII/1): 26–54.
- Vujčić, Nemanja (2021). "The City of Pelion and the Illyrian War of Alexander". Greek, Roman, and Byzantine Studies. 61.
- Weber, R. J. (1989). "The Taulantii and Pirustae in Livy's Version of the Illyrian Settlement of 167 B. C. : The Roman Record of Illyria". In Deroux, Carl (ed.). Studies in Latin Literature and Roman History. Vol. V. Latomus. pp. 66–93. ISBN 978-2-87031-146-2.
- Weissová, Barbora; Tušlová, Petra; Ardjanliev, Pero; Verčík, Marek (2017). "The Frontier Studies. Survey of the Northern Part of the Lake Ohrid Basin, Preliminary Report on the Season 2017". Studia Hercynia. XXII (1): 99–133. ISSN 2336-8144.
- Wilkes, John (1995). Gardner, Percy; Arthur, Ernest; Max Cary, Gardner (eds.). "Cabanes (P.) Ed. L'lllyrie meridionale et I'Epire dans I'antiquite. II. Paris: de Boccard, 1993. Pp. 284. PNS". Journal of Hellenic Studies. Council of the Society. doi:10.2307/631698. JSTOR 631698. S2CID 161129988.
- Winnifrith, Tom J. (2002). Badlands-borderlands: a history of Northern Epirus/Southern Albania. London: Duckworth. ISBN 0-7156-3201-9.
- Zindel, Christian; Lippert, Andreas; Lahi, Bashkim; Kiel, Machiel (2018). Albanien: Ein Archäologie- und Kunstführer von der Steinzeit bis ins 19. Jahrhundert (in German). Vandenhoeck & Ruprecht. ISBN 9783205200109.
