= Cangonj =

- Village
- Location within Albania
- Coordinates: 40°41′36.5676″N 20°54′30.495″E
- Country: Albania
- County: Korçë
- Municipality: Devoll
- Administrative unit: Progër

Area
  - Total: 0.55 km^{2} (0.21 sq mi)

Population
  - Total: 372
  - Density: 680/km^{2} (1,800/sq mi)
- Demonym(s): Cangonjar (male); Cangonjare (female)
- Time zone: UTC+1 (CET)
  - Summer (DST): UTC+2 (CEST)

Cangonj is a village in the Progër administrative unit in the Devoll Municipality of Albania. The population is about 372 inhabitants, most of which deal in subsistence farming or agricultural-related work. The village is located on an important mountain pass – the Cangonj Pass, attested in classical antiquity as Tsangon.

The Trans Adriatic Pipeline passes through Cangonj. The construction project has contributed to the infrastructure of the area, such as the funding for the repaving of the road that goes through Cangonj.
