= Kamenica Tumulus =

Coordinates: 40°32′39″N 20°43′34″E

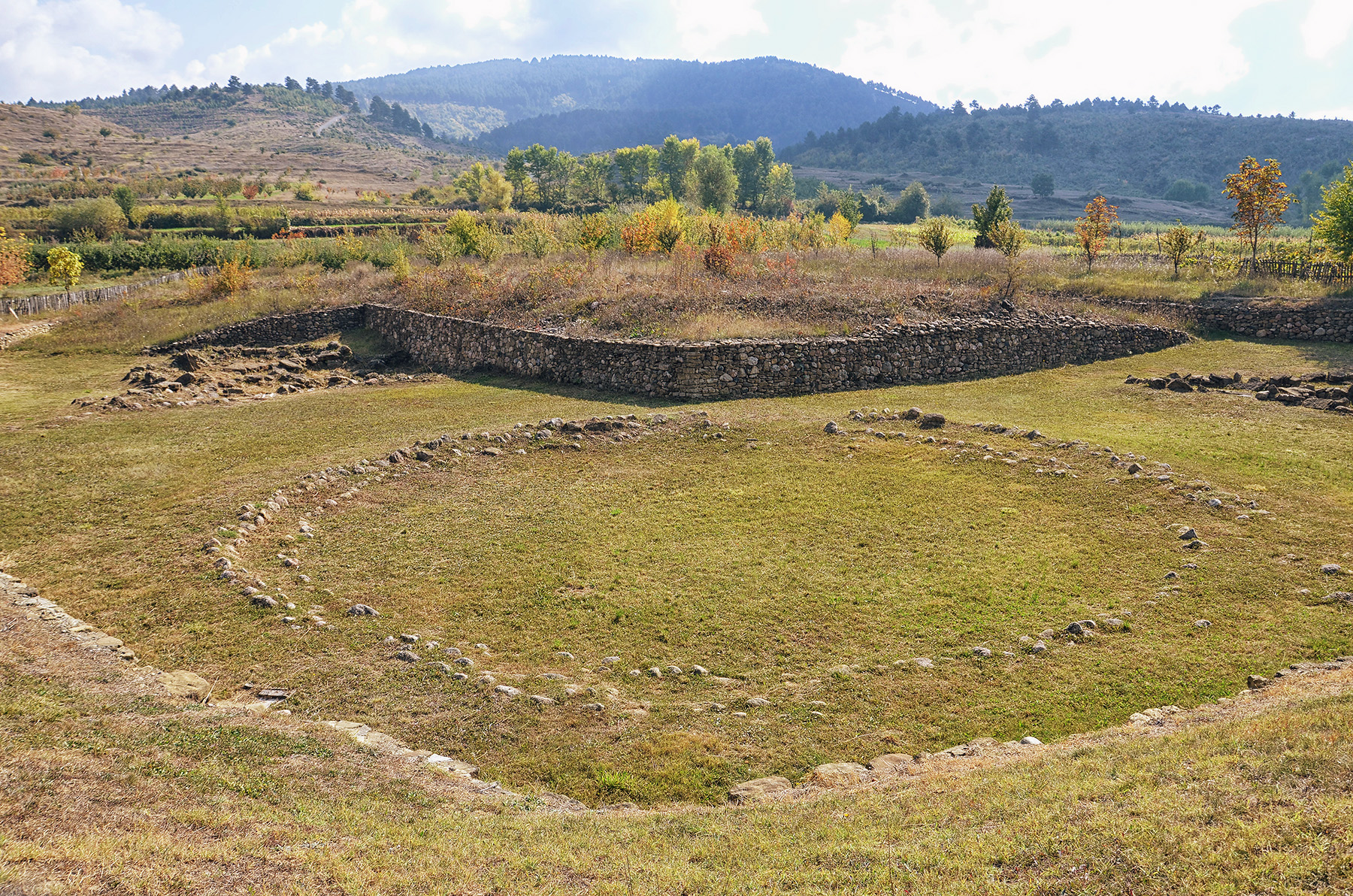
The first grave of the Kamenicë Tumulus

The Kamenica Tumulus (Albanian: Tuma e Kamenicës) is an archaeological site in Kamenicë, Korçë County, Albania. The site includes a museum dedicated to the prehistory of Albania and of the surrounding region.

== History of the Tumulus excavation ==
The tumulus is located in the side of the Kamenica hills in the southern side of the Korçë Plain, at 8 kilometres (5.0 mi) from Korçë.

Looters heavily damaged the site during the 1997–1999 period following the 1997 rebellion in Albania, which was followed by an interdisciplinary work performed in the 2000–2002 period by the Albanian Institute of Archaeology, the Albanian Rescue Archaeology Unit, and the Museum of Korçë and aimed at excavation campaigns.

The end of the excavations showed that the Tumulus of Kamenica represents the largest burial monument of its kind in relation to 200 tumuli excavated in Albania and neighboring Balkan countries.

The central grave, which dates back to the Bronze Age (13th century BC) is surrounded by two large concentric circles unlike any other tumuli discovered in Albania. The tumulus grew to 40 graves in the Late Bronze Age (1200-1050 BC) and to 200 in the Early Iron Age (1050–750 BC). The tumulus grew further until the 7th century BC until it took an elliptical shape with dimensions of 70 m X 50 m. During the excavation campaign more than 400 graves, 440 skeletons, and 3,500 archaeological objects were found.

Archaeologists have also found in one of the graves the skeleton of a pregnant woman and her unborn child dating to 3000 BC.

== Conservation and presentation work ==
In 2007, a stone bridge and a protecting wall in the southern part were built, followed by a canal dug in order to drain the waters. In addition green courtyards surround the tumulus and lime paths direct the visitors to the tumulus and to the museum.

== Museum and cultural activities ==
The museum is a portico style building, made of wood. It includes panels with the history of the excavation. Of particular interest is the illustration of the surgery of a male cranium, performed in the 6th century BC, which shows the advanced medical knowledge of the community that lived in the area at that time. The museum also includes two replica graves with the original remains.

The site organizes several cultural activities, in particular classical musical concerts. In addition, Albania's National Cultural Heritage Day on September 29 has been celebrated every year in the site.

== See also ==
- List of national parks in Albania

== Sources ==
- Gegollari, Nertila. "2007 Annual Bulletin of the Kamenica Tumulus" (PDF). Archeological and Museum Center of Kamenica. Archived from the original (PDF) on 11 September 2010.
