= Creonion =

Ancient town in Illyria

Creonion (Ancient Greek: Κρεώνιον) was an ancient town in the southern Illyrian region of Dassaretia, mentioned by Polybius in the 2nd century BC in the accounts of the Illyrian Wars and Macedonian Wars. The location of the ancient town is still unknown. It was probably situated near Lake Lychnidus (Ohrid).

Along with Antipatrea, Chrysondyon and Gertous, Creonion was one of the Dassaretan towns around which the Illyrian dynast Skerdilaidas and the Macedonian king Philip V fought in 217 BC. Creonion was a settlement of unspecified size.

== See also ==
- List of settlements in Illyria
