= Chrysondyon =

Ancient town in Illyria

Chrysondyon (Ancient Greek: Χρυσονδύων) was an ancient town in the southern Illyrian region of Dassaretia, mentioned by Polybius in the 2nd century BC in the accounts of the Illyrian Wars and Macedonian Wars. The location of the ancient town is unknown. It was probably situated between Lychnidus and Antipatrea.

Along with Antipatrea, Gertous and Creonion, Chrysondyon was one of the Dassaretan towns (also described as castella) around which the Illyrian dynast Skerdilaidas and the Macedonian king Philip V fought in 217 BC. The settlement of Chrysondyon was evidently walled.

== See also ==
- List of settlements in Illyria
