= Gertus =

Ancient town in Illyria

Gertus or Gertous (Ancient Greek: Γερτοῦς) was an ancient town in the southern Illyrian region of Dassaretia, mentioned by Polybius in the 2nd century BC in the accounts of the Illyrian Wars and Macedonian Wars. The location of the ancient town is still unknown. It was probably situated between Lychnidus and Antipatrea.

Along with Antipatrea, Chrysondyon and Creonion, Gertus was one of the Dassaretan towns (also described as castella) around which the Illyrian dynast Skerdilaidas and the Macedonian king Philip V fought in 217 BC. The settlement of Gertus was evidently walled.

== See also ==
- List of settlements in Illyria
