= Battle of Thebes =

Theban rebellion against Macedon (335 BC)

- Part of Alexander's Balkan campaign
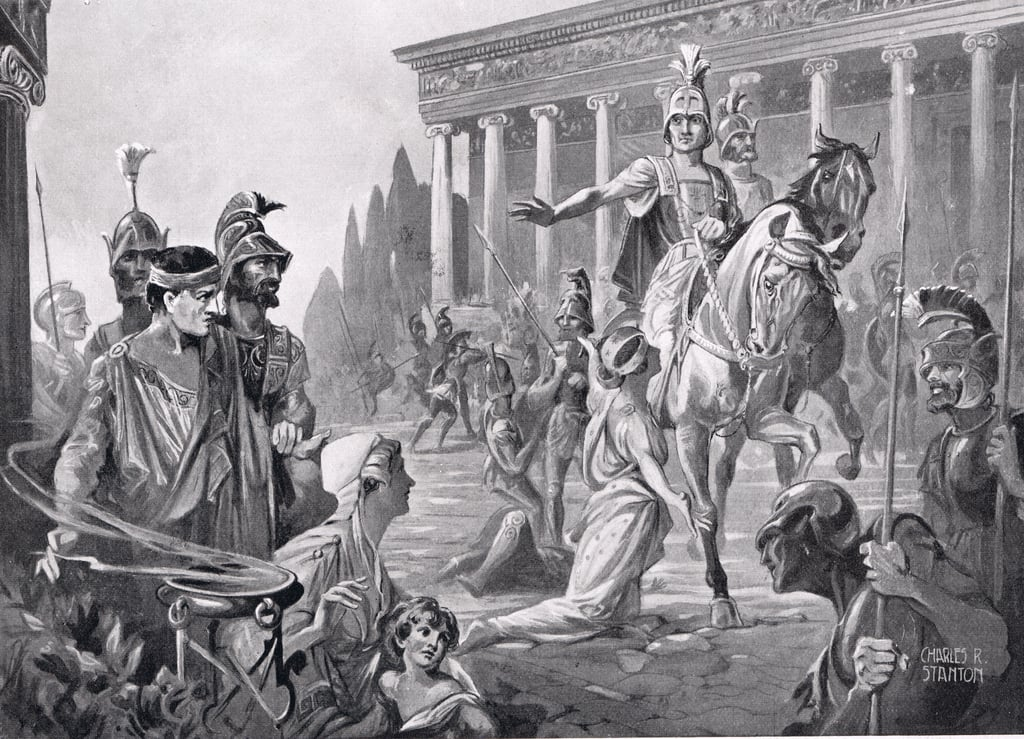
- Alexander at the sack of Thebes by Charles R. Stanton (illustration from Hutchinsons History of the Nations, 1915)
Date	335 BC
Location	Thebes, Boeotia, Greece 38°19′15″N 23°19′04″E
Result	Macedonian victory; Destruction of Thebes

Belligerents
Macedonia; League of Corinth	Thebes

Commanders and leaders
Alexander the Great	Phoinix †; Prothytes †

Strength
33,000: 30,000 infantry; 3,000 cavalry	15,000

Casualties and losses
Unknown	6,000 killed 30,000 captured

The Battle of Thebes took place between the army of Alexander the Great and the Greek city of Thebes in 335 BC immediately outside of and in the city proper in Boeotia. After succeeding his father as the hegemon of the Hellenic League, Alexander had marched to the north to deal with revolts in Illyria and Thrace.

== Background ==
Thebes had been under Macedonian occupation since the Battle of Chaeronea, which had resulted in the defeat and deposition of Thebes as the pre-eminent city-state of Southern Greece. The Thebans had reluctantly accepted this, as well as their compulsory membership in the League of Corinth, which had been previously imposed by Philip II of Macedon, Alexander's father.

Darius III started to distribute money to the Greek city-states with the hope that they would rise against Alexander who planned to invade the Persian empire. In addition to this, he had sent his most able general Memnon of Rhodes against the Macedonian troops that were already stationed in Ionia at this time.

News of Alexander had not reached the southern Greek city-states for some time. He had been busy with the siege of Pelium and a rumour had reached them that he had died during the course of this siege. Demosthenes, a prominent Athenian politician, produced a man who claimed to have been present at the siege and claimed that Alexander was dead. Alexander had, indeed, been injured during this siege, so it was not a totally implausible claim to make.

Upon learning of the alleged death of Alexander, Theban exiles in Athens raced off to their native city in Boeotia and sought to incite a revolt from Macedonian rule there. They killed two pro-Macedonian leaders and took power, but the acropolis of Cadmea remained in the hands of the Macedonians who had entrenched themselves there. Finally the Theban council decided on war against the Macedonians, which was justified as the liberation of the Greeks from Macedonian tyranny. The Thebans received Persian monetary aid as did Demosthenes who used it to purchase weapons and other equipment and donated it to the Thebans. The Athenian Ecclesia signed a defensive alliance with the Thebans clearly aimed against the Macedonians.

== Alexander's march ==
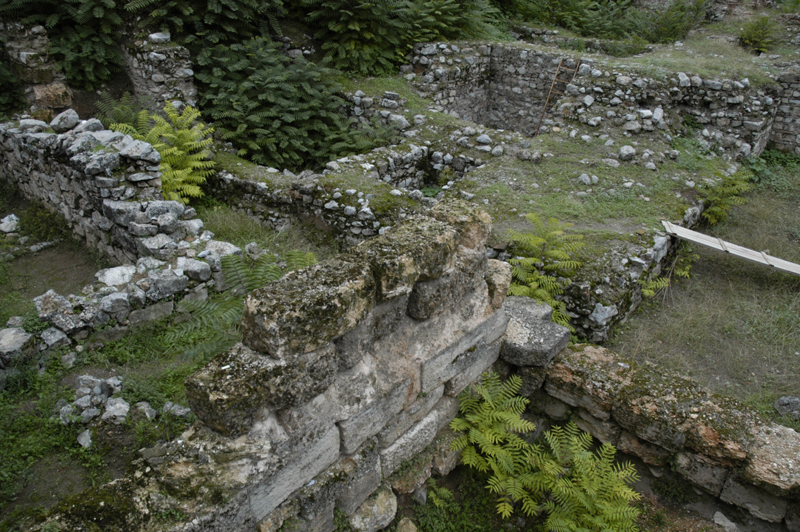
Remains of the Cadmeia, the citadel of Thebes

When Alexander learned of the revolt of Thebes, he was immediately concerned about the situation. He had secured the allegiance of the city-states at the beginning of his reign only because he had an army present with which to bring the city-states to terms. This time, there was no such army present in southern Greece. As a result, many cities were throwing off the Macedonian yoke.

He therefore raced south, marching over three hundred miles in two weeks, entering Thessaly by the seventh day and Boeotia by the end of the next week. The Thebans were shocked to see him in such close proximity to them, and did not believe that it was, in fact, Alexander at all, contesting that it was Antipater. He had passed through the pass of Thermopylae without any of the city-states' knowing.

== Alexander's arrival and siege ==
As Alexander arrived in Boeotia, many cities immediately deserted the cause of Greek independence and left Thebes to stand alone. Athens, led by Demosthenes, an inveterate opponent of Phillip, again denounced Macedonian hegemony and voted to support Thebes, supplying weapons, but Athens held back its forces, deciding to await events. The Spartans sent troops as far as the Isthmus of Corinth, but they also shrank from confronting Alexander.

Though abandoned, the Theban assembly met and enthusiastically decided on war, defying Alexander's throng of experienced troops at their gates. Hesitant to destroy the city, he approached slowly and initially encamped far from the walls, hoping to dissuade the resisters. He offered relatively lenient terms: the surrender of Phoenix and Prothytes, leaders of the insurrection, with all others spared. The Thebans flung back at him the demand that he surrender Antipater and Philotas to them.

The Cadmae citadel in Thebes, housing Alexander's garrison commanded by Philotas, had fortified itself against the Thebans in the outer city. The Thebans, in turn, had put a series of works surrounding the citadel, in addition to palisades around the city.

After three days preparation, Alexander divided his force in three parts. The first attacked the palisades and the second formed a line against the Theban infantry, with the third in reserve to reinforce gaps and press opportune advantages.

For their defense, the Thebans emancipated their slaves and faced them towards the Macedonian attack on the wall. The Theban cavalry was placed within the palisades. The Thebans made everything ready to fight to the last man, and put their women and children in the city temples.

In the assault, the Thebans fought desperately, fearing for their homes, wives, and children. The battle went on doubtfully for some time, but Alexander's reserves turned the tide. Alexander noticed that the Theban guard had abandoned one of their gates, and he seized the opportunity, sending Perdiccas' troops to take it and penetrate into the city. At this point, realizing that the walls were lost, the Thebans retreated into the city, but Philotas's garrison broke out of the citadel, surrounding the Thebans and ending the contest.

== Destruction of Thebes ==
Alexander punished the Thebans severely for their rebellion. Thirty thousand were sold into slavery and six thousand slain in the final fighting. The city was burnt to the ground, sparing only the temples, the Cadmea citadel and the house of Pindar, out of gratitude for Pindar's verses praising Alexander's ancestor, Alexander I of Macedon.

== Aftermath ==
The destruction of Thebes reverberated around Greece like an earthquake, prompting the execution of anti-Macedonian demagogues and the calming of revolts before they began. Alexander turned his attention to the great city of Athens, which remained aloof despite its alleged role in encouraging the Thebans and other Greek city-states to rebel. Thus, Alexander demanded that the city turn over ten strategoi that opposed Macedon's interests. However, thanks to the efforts of an Athenian known as Demades, Alexander was persuaded to be lenient.

== Bibliography ==
- Habicht, Christian (1998). Ελληνιστική Αθήνα [Hellenistic Athens] (in Greek). Athens: Odysseas. ISBN 960-210-310-8.
- Worthington, Ian (2015). "Intentional History: Alexander, Demosthenes, and Thebes". In Foxhall, Lin; Gehrke, Hans-Joachim; Luraghi, Nino (eds.). Intentional History : Spinning Time in Ancient Greece. Stuttgart: Franz Steiner Verlag. pp. 239–246. ISBN 978-3-515-11288-8.
