= Nade Proeva =

Macedonian historian (1949–2024)

Nade Proeva, Macedonian historian and professor of ancient Macedonian history

Nade Proeva (Наде Проева, 9 September 1949 - 6 November 2024) was a Macedonian historian, classicist and professor of ancient history at the Faculty of Philosophy at Ss. Cyril and Methodius University of Skopje. Her research focused on the history of Ancient Macedon, Roman epigraphy, numismatics and classical antiquity.

== Biography ==
Born in Resen on 9 September 1949, Proeva completed her high school education in her hometown before studying classical archaeology at the University of Belgrade, where she graduated in 1973. From 1973 to 1975, she worked as a museum curator in Prilep. She returned to the University of Belgrade for her graduate studies, earning a master's degree in 1978 on Roman-era funerary monuments in Macedonia and a PhD in history in 1992 focusing on cultural developments in the Roman province of Macedonia. Between 1979 and 1981, she also completed postgraduate specialization in epigraphy, numismatics, and ancient religion at the Sorbonne in Paris.

In March 1984, Proeva began teaching ancient history at the Institute of History within the Faculty of Philosophy in Skopje. She became an assistant professor teaching the history of the ancient Macedonians in 1993 and later served as a full professor until her retirement. Alongside her work in Skopje, she conducted research and guest lectures across Europe, including at the French School at Athens, Paris Nanterre University, the University of Nancy, and the Austrian Academy of Sciences and participated in archaeological excavations in North Macedonia, Serbia, Greece, and Poland.

Grave of Prof. Dr. Nade Proeva, at Butel City Cemetery (Градски гробишта Бутел) in Skopje

Proeva edited the 11-volume historical book series Historia Antiqua Macedonica as well as Miscellanea Byzantino-macedoniaca. Her 2004 book History of the Argeads (Историја на Аргеадите) was the first university textbook written in Macedonian on ancient Macedonian history.

In 1996, the French government appointed her a Knight of the Order of Academic Palms (Chevalier dans l'Ordre des Palmes Académiques) for her contributions to French culture and scholarship. Proeva died in Skopje on 6 November 2024 at age 75. She was posthumously awarded the Order of 8 September by the President of North Macedonia for her contributions to Macedonian historiography. Following her death, the Center for Historical Studies, "Nade Proeva - Macedonica" continued publishing research in her name, the Ministry of Culture approved a permanent memorial room dedicated to her at the Saraj palace in Resen, and filmmaker Pavlina Proevska directed the biographical documentary NADE: Instead of a Hagiography (Наде: Наместо агиографија).

== Awards and honors ==
- Order of Academic Palms (Chevalier dans l'Ordre des Palmes Académiques, France, 1996)
- Certificate of recognition from the Institute of History and Archaeology at Goce Delčev University of Štip (2023)
- Commemorative plaque from the Faculty of Philosophy in Skopje (2024, posthumous)
- Order of 8 September (North Macedonia, posthumous)
Chevalier of the Order of Academic Palms awarded to Prof. Dr. Nade Proeva by the French government, 1996.

Order of 8 September

Commemorative plaque from the Faculty of Philosophy in Skopje

Certificate from Goce Delčev University of Štip (2023)

== Selected works ==
=== Books ===
- The Influence of Settlers on the Development of Cultural Conditions in the Roman Province of Macedonia (Влијанието на доселениците врз развојот на културните прилики во римската провинција Македонија), doctoral thesis (1992)
- Studies on the Ancient Macedonians (Студии за античките Македонци, Skopje, 1997)
- Natural and Cultural Monuments (Skopje, 2000)
- History of the Argeads (Историја на Аргеадите, Skopje, 2004)
- Alexander of Macedon: Life and Work (Александар Македонски: живот и дело, Skopje, 2012)
- The Religion of the Ancient Macedonians (Религијата на античките Македонци, Skopje, 2014)
- Triptych on Macedonian Identity (Триптих за македонскиот идентитет: огледи за македонското самосознание од средниот до новиот век, Skopje, 2018)

=== Editorial work (Historia Antiqua Macedonica series) ===
- Pierre Carlier, Demosthenes (Демостен, 1994)
- Fanula Papazoglu, History of the Hellenistic Period (Историја на хеленистичкиот период, 1995)
- Pierre Cabanes, The Illyrians from Bardylis to Gentius (За Илирите од Бардилис до Гентиј, 1996)
- Pierre Briant, Alexander the Great (Александар Велики, 1997)
- Nade Proeva, Studies on the Ancient Macedonians (Студии за античките Македонци, 1997)
- Alfred Delacoulonche, The Cradle of Macedonian Statehood (Лулката на македонската државност, 2000)
- Nade Proeva, History of the Argeads (Историја на Аргеадите, 2004)
- Plutarch, Parallel Lives (Напоредни животописи, 2008)
- Fanula Papazoglu, History of the Epigoni (Историја на Епигоните, 2008)
- Nade Proeva, Alexander of Macedon: Life and Work (Александар Македонски: живот и дело, 2012)
- Nade Proeva, The Religion of the Ancient Macedonians (Религијата на античките Македонци, 2014)

=== Selected peer-reviewed journal articles ===
- "The Macedonians in De thematibus by Constantine VII Porphyrogenitus" (with H. Melovski), Živa Antika 37 (1–2), 1987.
- "Heroization of the Deceased in the Roman Province of Macedonia", Zbornik Narodnog muzeja u Beogradu XX–1, 2011.
- "National Myths in Contemporary Europe and the Denial of Macedonian Identity", Slavia Meridionalis 12, Polish Academy of Sciences, 2012.
- "Sur l'iconographie des stèles funéraires du «type Tikveš» en Macédoine à l'époque romaine", 2013
- "Non-Figural Motifs on the Roman Funerary Stelae from Upper Macedonia", Živa Antika 67, 2017
- "100 Years of Trebenište", Vjesnik za arheologiju i historiju dalmatinsku 112, Split, 2019
