= Lake Malik =

Former lake in Albania

Malik
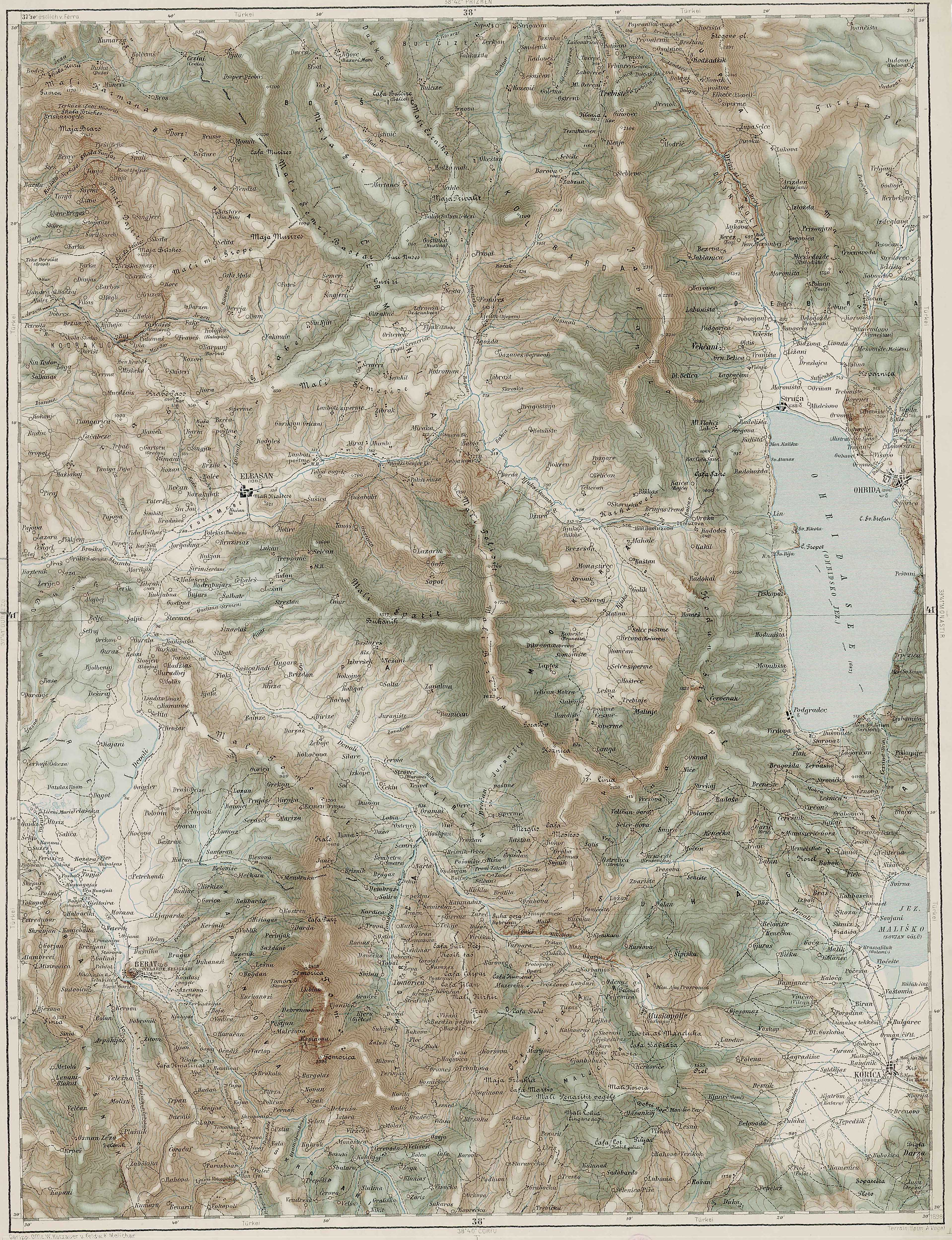
- Austro-Hungarian map from 1887 depicting Lake Malik on the bottom right side, south of lake Ohrid named "Jezero Mališko (Sovjav Gölü)"

- Location within Albania Location within Balkans
- Interactive map of Malik
- Location: Korçë County, Albania
- Coordinates: 40°44′N 20°46′E
- Basin countries: Albania
- Settlements: Maliq

Lake Malik (Albanian: Liqeni I Maliqit, Macedonian: Маличко Езеро Malicko Ezero - meaning "small lake", Greek: Λίμνη Μαλίκη Límni Malíki) is an artificially drained lake in the north-western area of the Korçë Plain in south-eastern Albania.

== History ==
The government took the decision to drain the lake after 1939 to combat malaria. The draining operation started in 1946 using convict labour and it created new agricultural areas.
