= Korçë Plain =

Coordinates: 40°42′11″N 20°47′28″E

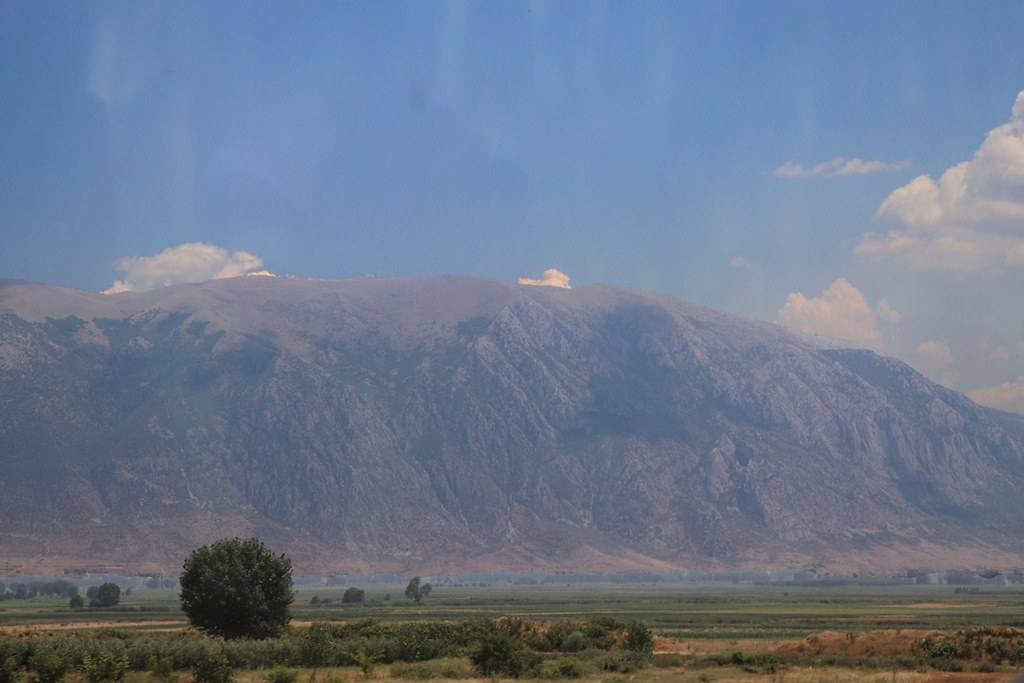
The Korçë Plain

The Korçë Plain (Albanian: Fusha e Korçës) or Korça Basin is a small, fertile, intermountain basin in southeastern Albania.

In its southern side is found the Kamenica Tumulus.

== Geology ==
The basin is a major N-S trending – still active - graben structure of the Dinarides located at the border of Northern Macedonia and S-E Albania. The structure was formed during the Pleistocene and stretches from lake Ohrid to Ersekë via Korçë.

== Geography ==
The plain has a surface of about 300 km^{2}. Its length is about 35 km and its maximal width is about 16 km. In the southernmost edge the absolute elevation is 880 m above sea level, gently sloping to 815 m in the area of the former Maliq Marsh in the north-western area of the basin. The plain is surrounded by highlands reaching altitudes of 2000 m.

The basin is drained by two rivers, Devoll and Dunavec. Devoll river crosses the northern area of the plain flowing from east to west, passing through the Maliq marshes. Dunavec River crosses the basin in south-north direction joining the Devoll near the town of Maliq.

== Climate ==
As of the Köppen climate classification, Korçë Plain falls under the periphery of the warm-summer Mediterranean climate (Csb) zone with an average annual temperature of 10.4 °C (50.7 °F). Average rainfall is about 720 mm/year of which about 70% falls in the winter season.

== Agriculture ==
The plain is agriculturally important enabling the cultivation of summer crops such as sugarbeets, potatoes, maize and fruit trees using irrigation resources.
