= Pëllumbas =

Pëllumbas may refer to:

- Pëllumbas, Berat
- Pëllumbas, Tirana
- Pëllumbas cave, near Pëllumbas, Tirana
