= Dajti Castle =

Roman ruins in Albania

Coordinates: 41°21′13″N 19°55′20″E

- Kalaja e Dajtit (Albanian)
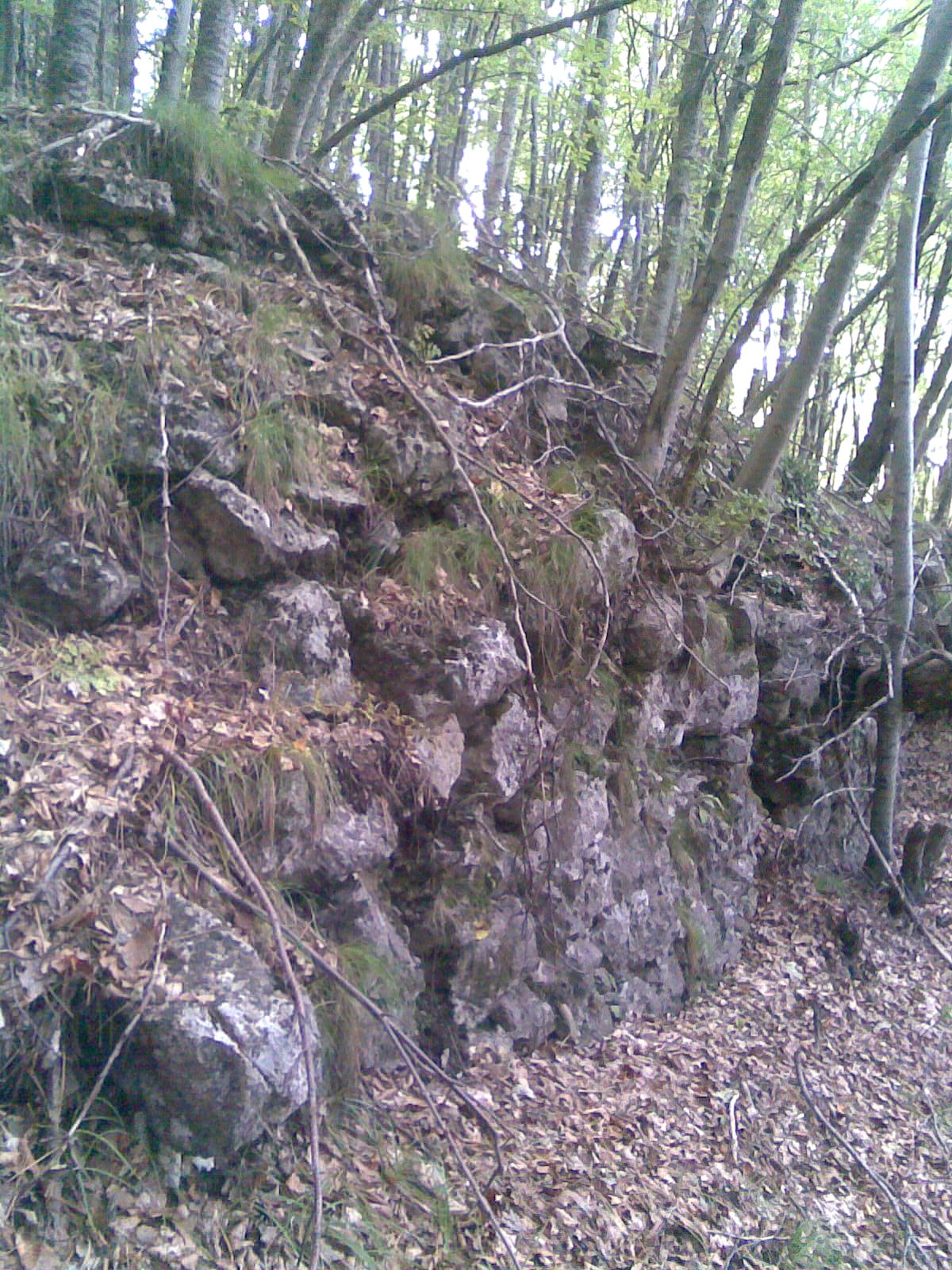
- The walls of Dajti Castle in the Dajti Mountain National Park, partially covered by dense vegetation of beech forest
- Interactive map of Dajti Castle
- Location: Dajti Mountain National Park, Tirana, Albania

History
- Built: 6th century

Cultural Monument of Albania
- Designated: January 15, 1963

Dajti Castle (Albanian: Kalaja e Dajtit) is a 1.12 hectares (2.8 acres) archaeological site in Albania, comprising the ruins of a Roman fortification and several dwellings. It belongs to late antiquity, probably having been built over Illyrian foundations. It lies at 1,200 metres (3,900 ft) altitude on top of a hill, west-side of Mount Dajti, close to Tirana. It was discovered in 1963 and eventually was inscribed in the list of the Cultural Monuments of Albania. In 2008 a three-year restoration project began, aiming to conduct further archaeological searching and surveys and to improve the nearby infrastructure for visitors and tourists.

== History ==
According to the archaeological material, construction and the analysis carried on site, the castle of Dajti is thought to date back to the late antiquity in the 6th century. Procopius of Caesarea in his panegyric work Buildings of Justinian writes that the East Roman (Byzantine) Emperor Justinian I (r. 527–565) "...built 32 castles and reconstructed 26 others in Epirus Nova, in order to protect it from the Slavic attacks". He also mentioned the castle Tirkan, the probable origin of Albania capital's name Tirana, dating back to 1st century BC and lying on Dajti's mountainside, which might be Tujani Castle, on a much lower altitude than Dajti castle.

The castle was discovered in 1963 by the historian and archaeologist Neritan Ceka. Soon afterwards it was declared a Culture Monument of 1st category on January 15, 1963, by the Rectorate of the State University (today University of Tirana).

== Location ==
Dajti castle is located within Dajti Mountain National Park at an average altitude of 1,200 metres (3,900 ft) above sea level. The ruins of the castle and of the dwellings beside it lie on the top of a hill formation with a saddle like form on the western side of Mount Dajti (highest peak 1,612 metres (5,289 ft)). It is 25 km by road from Tirana city centre, or it can be reached through a 4.2 km long cable-car route (which takes approximately 15 minutes) and then travelling by car or walking on foot from the cable car terminal for 2,500 metres (8,200 ft). At the end there is the climbing of the slopy part within the forest.

The castle overlooks the whole western Albania and offers an impressive panorama, since it has a high relative altitude of 1,100 m (3,600 ft) from Tirana and its plain. The port city of Durrës and the Adriatic Sea can be clearly seen. From this strategic position a very wide range of territory from northwest to south could be observed.

== Architecture ==
From the walls' analysis, two main construction phases can be ascertained. The first phase, a typical dry stone method, is realized with large quadrangular stone blocks, bound together without any mortar, suggesting of an earlier Illyrian castle. The other phase of the walls is done through unworked smaller stones bound with mortar and belongs to the later Roman period. The archaeological site has an overall area of 11,200 square metres (121,000 sq ft). The castle's walls that follow the sloppy terrain have a triangular shape, with a perimeter of 550 metres (1,800 ft). The northern wall is 150 metres (490 ft), the eastern is 190 metres (620 ft), whereas the southern wall of the castle is 210 metres (690 ft) long. A transverse wall divides the northern part of the fortification, thus creating a small acropolis like structure. The width of the walls is 2.3 metres (7 ft 7 in). The main architectural elements of the fortification are its towers, located in each of the vertices of the triangle. The southern tower of circular shape has an outer diameter of 7.3 m (24 ft) and 1.15 m (3.8 ft) wide walls. A small 0.85 m (2.8 ft) wide entrance leads towards it.

== Archaeological material ==
The most important findings on the site were several coins of the Byzantine emperor Tiberius II Constantine (r. 578–582). Interesting is an 18 cm (7.1 in) iron tool in the form of a knife. Inside the castle and on the flat terraces several ceramic fragments were found. They were of an almost pure clay, well-baked but without any paint. The found ceramics were mostly parts of typical Roman roof tiles and fewer pottery objects and everyday vessels. The most distinctive ceramic is a tile fragment with figures stamped on it, resembling the Illyrian decorative motifs. Slag from the process of ore smelting has also been found, suggesting that the locals were familiar with this process. Mount Dajt is rich in bauxite and still today there is a bauxite mine near the site. A vessel with flutings and the remains of a profiled loom are evidences of the introduced Roman culture in the site.

== Restoration project ==
Forty-five years after its discovery and inscription in the Albanian Culture Monuments list, in 2008 the Culture Monuments Institute’s archaeologists Spiro Nika and Suela Xhyheri prepared a restoration project for Dajti castle. The project was approved and started the implementation phase under the coordinator, Prof.Dr Skënder Muçaj, from the Institute of Archaeology. The Institute of Culture Monuments, Regional Directory of Culture Monuments, the Institute of Archaeology, Dajti commune and Dajti Mountain National Park were cooperators within this project.

== See also ==
- Roman military engineering
