= Lake Bovilla =

Lake in Tirana County, Albania

- Ujëmbledhësi i Bovillës (Albanian)
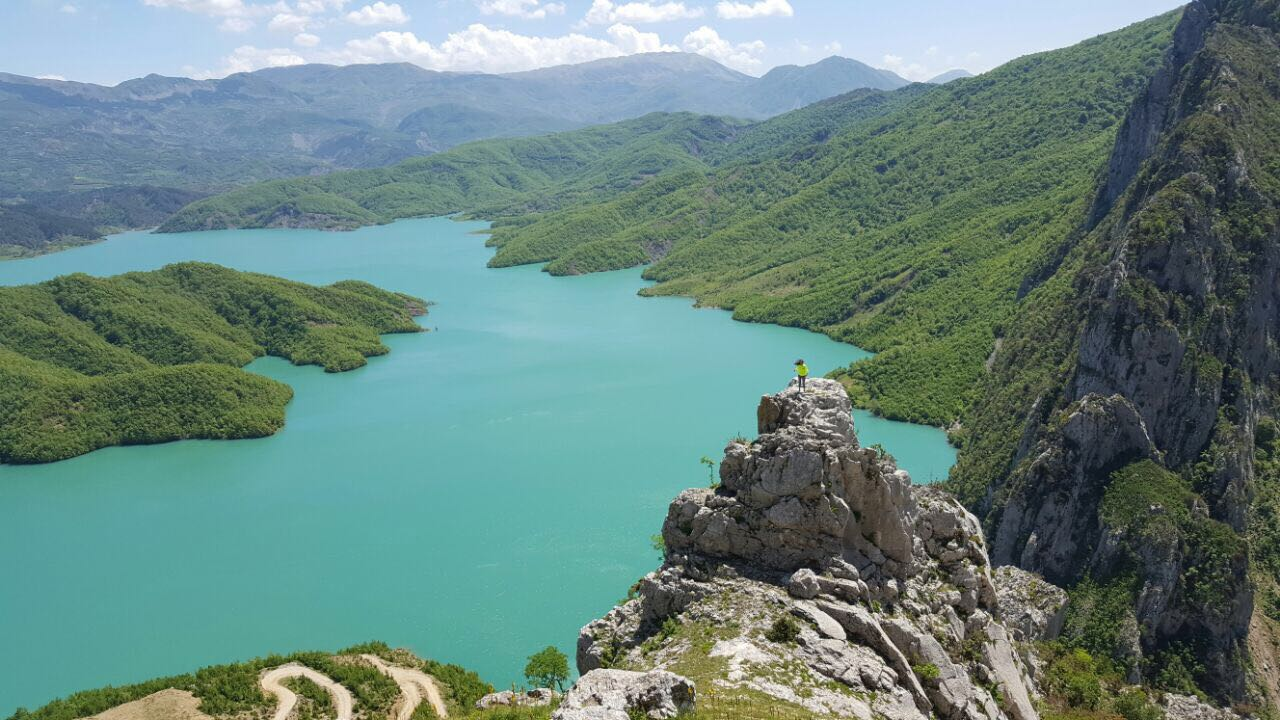
- Bovilla Reservoir

- Location within Albania
- Location: Albania
- Coordinates: 41°26′43″N 19°52′00″E
- Type: reservoir
- Surface area: 4.6 square kilometres (1.8 sq mi)
- Website: https://lakebovilla.com/

The Bovilla reservoir (Albanian: Ujëmbledhësi i Bovillës) is a 4.6 square kilometres (1.8 sq mi) reservoir in Albania, approximately 9 miles (14 km) northeast of Tirana and southeast of Kruja, within Dajti Mountain National Park. It provides most of the drinking water for Tirana.

== Geography ==
The reservoir is formed by a dam of the river Tërkuzë, a tributary of the Ishëm. The Tërkuzë has its source to the east of the outer chain of the coastal mountain range, running through the deep Shkallë e Bovillës canyon between Mount Maja e Gomtitit (1268 m) and Mount Mali i Bjeshit (1239 m). The dam stands at the entrance to this canyon and is made from local conglomerate, gravel and sand. It is 91 m high and 130 m long.

Construction work originally began in 1988, but stopped with the collapse of communism. In October 1993, work was resumed thanks to the support of the Italian state. After the end of construction in 1996, the lake took until 1998 to fill and begin to serve its purpose.

The water level varies over the course of the year by 7–10 metres, with the high water mark being reached during the rainy winter months. Measurements from 2006 to 2008 showed the greatest depth was around 45 metres. The difference from the original depth of 53 metres must be due to the sediment brought down by the river from upstream.

The Tërkuzë provides around 105,000,000 m^{3} of water per year from a catchment area of roughly 98 km^{2} (38 sq mi). The annual water consumption is around 78,000,000 m^{3} - roughly the size of the reservoir. Roughly 1,800 litres of water are delivered to the processing plant from the reservoir per second, through a steel pipe (roughly 50 to 57 million m^{3} per year). In addition to this surface water, the drinking water supply of Tirana is supplemented by natural underground wells and artesian wells, to meet a required need of 2.8 m^{3} per second (2009 estimate). The steel pipeline linking the reservoir to the processing plant in Kodra Kuqe, north of Tirana, is around 90 cm in diameter. Some of the water in the reservoir is also used for irrigation.

== Nature preservation ==
The reservoir is located within the Mount Dajt National Park, a bit south of Shtamë Pass National Park. The cliff faces around the canyon and the dam offer good climbing prospects. Swimming in the reservoir is forbidden. There were only a few kinds of fish in the lake: the Schneider (Alburnoides bipunctatus) and Barbus carp were the most common. Large numbers of grass carp have been caught by fishermen. The silver carp (Hypophthalmichthys molitrix) has been repeatedly introduced to improve the water quality.

Nine remote villages with over five thousand inhabitants are scattered in the hills around the reservoir. The inhabitants derive their livelihoods primarily from agriculture. About 400 families had to be resettled in order to create the reservoir. They received compensation for their land, but the movement was still violently opposed.

In September 2001, a bad odour and taste were first noticed in the water from the reservoir. Subsequently, a thorough investigation determined that the water quality was basically good. The source of the odour was suggested to be oxygen-dependent actinobacteria and streptomyces. Experts suggested measures to reduce the turbidity of the water: reforestation to reduce erosion, a protected area along the shore of the reservoir, and processing the wastewater from the settlements and farms in the surrounding area.

== Bibliography ==
- Aleko Miho, Alqiviadh Çullaj, Reinhard Bachofen (Ed.), Bovilla (Albania) – Limnological Study / Studim Limnologjik. Julvin 2, Tirana 2009, ISBN 978-99956-14-29-4 (researchgate.net).
