= Environmental issues in Albania =

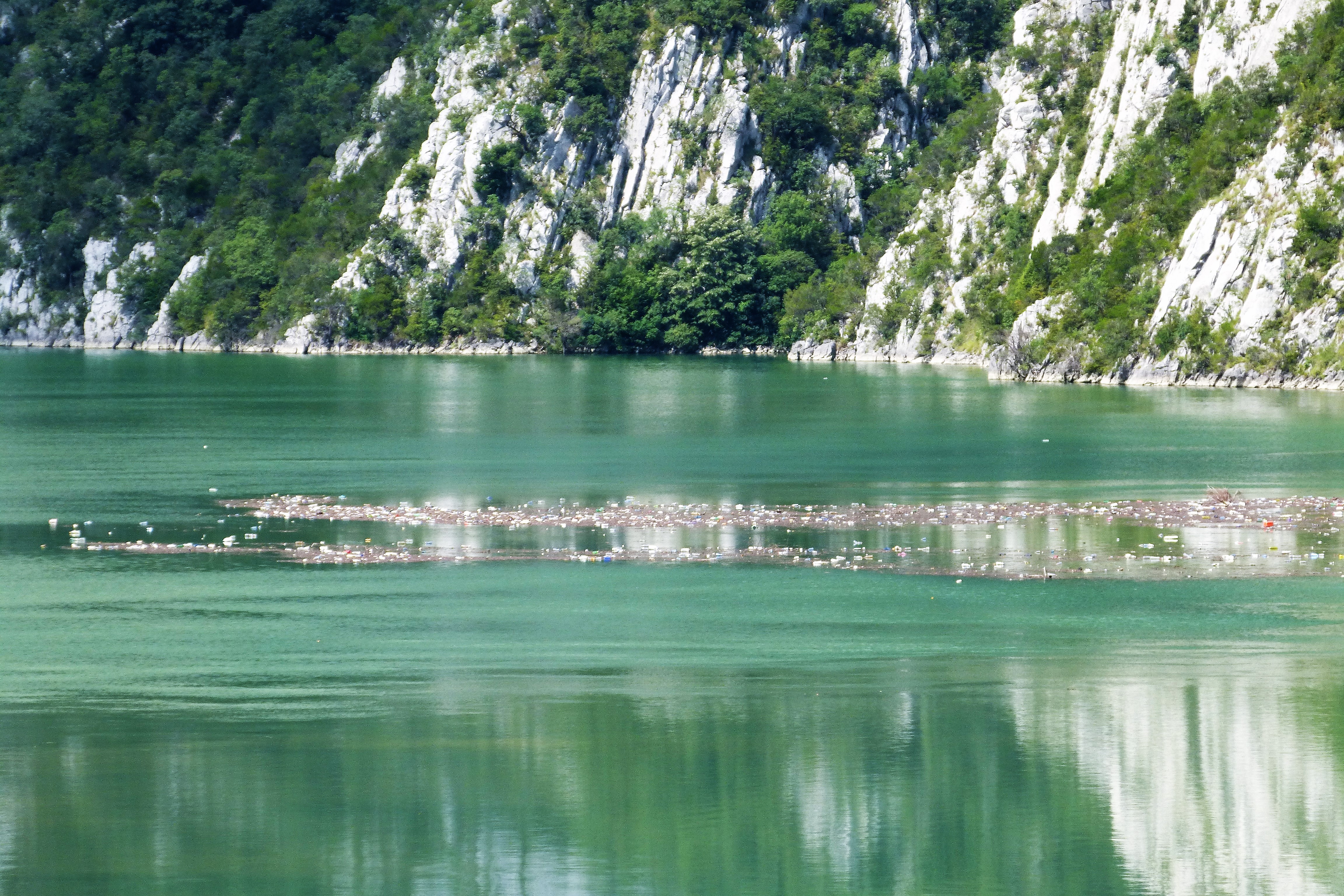
Plastic in Koman Gorge, Albania.

Albania is a developing country on the Balkan Peninsula in southeast Europe. Isolated for much of the 20th century it began a gradual transition to a market economy in the early 1990s. Tourism, which developed only after 1990, has since become one of the country's most important industries. Its total contribution to the gross domestic product rose from 19.9% in 2013 to 27.8% in 2023, and also. In 2023 Albania was among the first countries to exceed its pre pandemic tourism levels. Researchers have noted that economic growth has often taken priority over environmental and social concerns, putting the country's long term sustainability at risk.

A number of non governmental organizations work on the environmental issues in the country. These main environmental problems include water pollution, inadequate waste management, and deforestation. Many of these problems are concentrated in and around the capital, Tirana, where rising vehicle traffic has degraded air quality and rivers carry untreated sewage. The rapid and often unregulated growth of tourism and construction, particularly along the coast, has placed additional pressure on natural areas. Climate change adds further pressure, although Albania is a relatively low emitter of greenhouse gasses, it is among the European countries most vulnerable to natural disasters such as floods and wildfires.

== Issues ==
=== Air pollution ===
Air pollution is a major environmental issue in the bigger cities of Albania, especially the capital, Tirana. The sharp increase in air pollution in bigger cities resulted from a sharp increase in car ownership, increasing secondary activity in the area and a decrease in urban greenery. Annual average concentrations of PM10 and NO_{2} in Tirana are above the limit values of National Air Quality Standard and World Health Organization.

=== Climate change ===
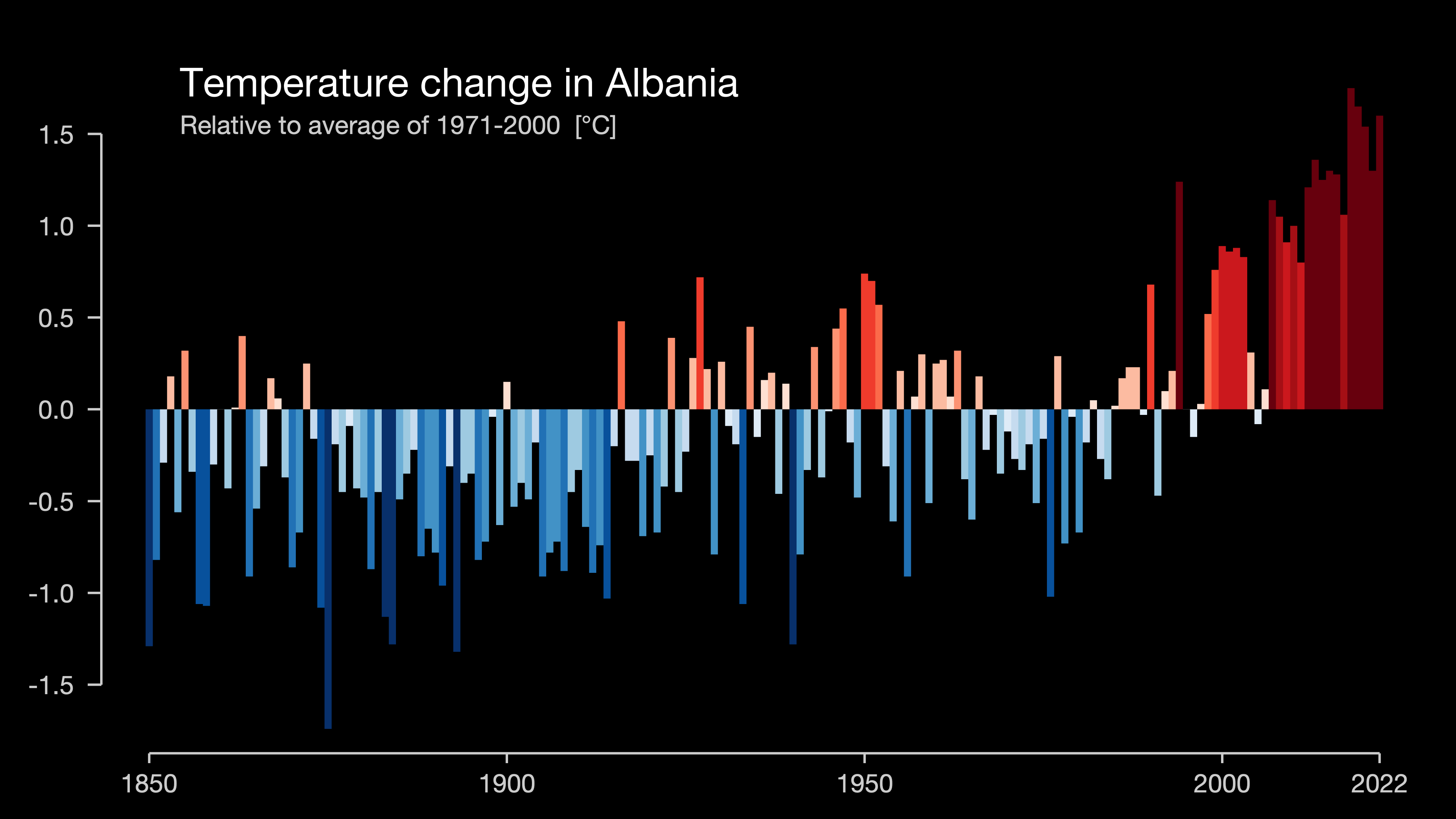
Temperature change in Albania, each bar represents the temperature over a year.

Albania is one of the European countries most at risk and vulnerable to natural disasters. Natural disasters, such as floods and forest fires, are increasing in Albania due to climate change, causing significant damage. Albania experiences nearly one natural disaster annually on average, each disaster causing damage equivalent to 1.3% of the country's GDP and impacting around 5% of the population. Rising sea levels are anticipated to negatively impact coastal communities and the tourism industry.

In 2023 Albania emitted 7.67 million tonnes of greenhouse gases, equivalent to 2.73 tonnes per person, making it a relatively low emitting country. Albania's Nationally Determined Contribution to the UNFCCC, submitted in 2016 and revised in 2021, outlines efforts to enhance climate resilience across key sectors, including energy, agriculture, public health, and biodiversity. The country is prioritizing adaptation through policies, research, and investments in areas such as coastal protection, urban planning, and climate awareness. Albania's climate action is guided by its National Adaptation Planning and its Third National Communication. The country is dedicated to creating a long-term strategy for low-carbon development and reducing its greenhouse gas emissions. Albania has pledged a 20.9% reduction in GHG emissions by 2030.

=== Water pollution ===
Water pollution in Albania is caused by disposal of trash, and discharge of untreated wastewater and sewage. Two rivers which pass through the capital, Tirana, are two of the most polluted rivers in Albania. Lanë and Ishëm (river) are clean at their source, but once they enter Tirana, their water is several times more polluted than allowed standards. Industrial pollution has been observed in the river's Shkumbini, Fani, Gjanika and Semani, where toxic organic compounds and metals from mining and industrial activity are heavily affecting these rivers.

=== Waste ===
Albania's waste management system is underdeveloped, with limited collection systems in cities and little to none in rural areas. About 70% of the country is served by public waste collection. Only a small share of waste is recycled, mostly materials gathered by informal waste pickers and sold to private companies that prepare them for recycling in Albania or for export. Most municipal waste is disposed of in non-sanitary landfills, some of them illegal. Littering and illegal dumping trash both remain as a serious problem for Albania. In its 2025 report on Albania's progress towards EU membership, the European commission found no progress in the area of environment and climate change and noted that draft laws on integrated waste management and extended producer responsibility has yet to be adopted. Albania has also not banned single use plastics, and separate waste collection is limited to a single pilot project in Berat.

=== Deforestation ===
Illegal logging is the main threat to Albanian forests. The other threat comes from forest fires which in the last years have intensified. Albania had a 2018 Forest Landscape Integrity Index mean score of 6.77/10, ranking it 64th globally out of 172 countries.

=== Tree cover extent and loss ===
Global Forest Watch publishes annual estimates of tree cover loss and 2000 tree cover extent derived from time-series analysis of Landsat satellite imagery in the Global Forest Change dataset. In this framework, tree cover refers to vegetation taller than 5 m (including natural forests and tree plantations), and tree cover loss is defined as the complete removal of tree cover canopy for a given year, regardless of cause.

For Albania, country statistics report cumulative tree cover loss of 47,320 ha (473.2 km^{2}) from 2001 to 2024 (about 7.3% of its 2000 tree cover area). For tree cover density greater than 30%, country statistics report a 2000 tree cover extent of 648,459 ha (6,484.59 km^{2}). The charts and table below display this data. In simple terms, the annual loss number is the area where tree cover disappeared in that year, and the extent number shows what remains of the 2000 tree cover baseline after subtracting cumulative loss. Forest regrowth is not included in the dataset.

Annual tree cover loss in Albania, 2001–2024. View chart definition.
Tree cover extent in 2000 minus cumulative tree cover loss in Albania, 2001–2024 (loss-only residual; does not account for gain). View chart definition.

Annual tree cover extent and loss
Year	Tree cover extent (km2) (Note: This residual measure does not include forest regrowth.)	Annual tree cover loss (km2)
2001	6,447.30	37.29
2002	6,438.40	8.90
2003	6,432.26	6.14
2004	6,399.91	32.35
2005	6,392.97	6.94
2006	6,383.35	9.62
2007	6,331.13	52.22
2008	6,276.43	54.70
2009	6,263.05	13.38
2010	6,256.52	6.53
2011	6,244.65	11.87
2012	6,190.69	53.96
2013	6,164.99	25.70
2014	6,154.48	10.51
2015	6,151.64	2.84
2016	6,142.36	9.28
2017	6,125.49	16.87
2018	6,105.00	20.49
2019	6,094.27	10.73
2020	6,083.11	11.16
2021	6,066.26	16.85
2022	6,045.30	20.96
2023	6,020.28	25.02
2024	6,011.39	8.89

=== Tourism and coastal development ===
The rapid growth of tourism has raised concerns about its effect on the environment, particularly along the coast, where it has been associated with water shortages and environmental degradation. A 2025 study warned that intensive uncontrolled tourism that does not match the country's resources could undermine Albania's sustainable development goals. Experts interviewed for the study identified overdevelopment in tourist areas and unregulated hydropower projects as practices that need careful management.

Construction activity has also expanded. A 2024 study of Albanias real estate sector between 1995 and 2022 found that increases in construction permits and economic growth were associated with higher carbon emissions, indicating a development model that diverges from sustainable practices. The authors recommended mandatory environmental impact assessments for new projects, green building standards, and greater investment in renewable energy.

Several large tourism and infrastructure projects have been built in or near protected areas. The European commission's 2025 progress report on Albania cited the construction of a resort in Bunë-Velipojë Protected Landscape, despite local protests and plans to include the area in the Natura 2000 network. It also cited Vlorë International Airport in the in the Pishë Poro–Nartë area, built despite repeated requests from the Bern Convention's Standing Committee to suspend the works. The report linked amendments to the law on protected areas and the extension of the strategic Investment Law to 2027 to increased pressure on these areas. In 2026, a luxury resort project linked to Jared Kushner which includes hotels on Sazan Island and in the Vjosa-Narta Protected Landscape, prompted protests by thousands of people in Tirana. The Vjosa-Narta area is a coastal wetland that is home to flamingos, seals, and sea turtle nesting sites.

In October 2024, the Ministry of Tourism and Environment presented a National Tourism Strategy for 2024-2030 that it says integrates environmental protection and community engagement into tourism growth, and Albania has joined the Global Sustainable Tourism Council.

== Environmental movement in Albania ==
Albania's environmental movement consists of local and national non-government organization (NGOs). Among the main organizations in Albania are Ekolëvizja, the Institute for Environmental Policy in Albania, Regional Environmental Center in Albania, EDEN Center, and Millieukontakt Albania.

== See also ==
- Albanian incinerators scandal
- List of environmental issues
- List of conservation topics
- List of conservation issues
- Lists of environmental topics
- List of sustainability topics
