= Barç =

- Village
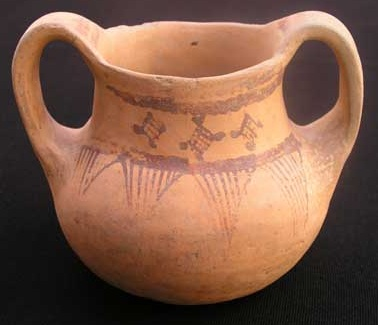
- Devolli type pottery from one of the tumuli around Barç

- Location within Albania
- Coordinates: 40.629°N 20.804°E
- Country: Albania
- County: Korçë
- Municipality: Korçë
- Administrative unit: Qendër Bulgarec
- Time zone: UTC+1 (CET)
  - Summer (DST): UTC+2 (CEST)

Barç is a village in the municipal unit of Qendër Bulgarec of the municipality Korçë in Korçë County, Albania. It lies in the South-eastern part of Albania at the Western edge of Morava Mountains North-East from Korçë. This village is famous as an archaeological site regarding Prehistoric Albania. There is a source of subjects from neolithics, Bronze and Iron Ages.

== Archaeological sites ==
There is a settlement from the Neolithic at the border of the village (Albanian: Vendbanimi prehistorik i Barçit) where two layers of settlements were founded. First is from Early Neolithic, which was used as a place for living between BC 7000–6000 (Barç I). Territory was a place for living for the humans at the end of the Neolithic as well, between BC 3500–2600. Based on the topological characteristics of tools made from stone, chert or bones as well as potteries found in the early Neolithics layer the literacy of the settlement was categorised to the Podgorje Culture. From the shape point of view its monochrome potteries (which were red, deep red, grey or black) had no big variance. Edge of the vessels with spherical- hemispherical- flat or ring-shaped shoes were straight rarely oval to inside. Not so many of these had handle. Most common ornamentical characteristics were the usage of impresso or barbotine technique.
