= Cave of Pëllumbas =

Cave and tourist attraction in Albania

- IUCN category III (natural monument or feature)
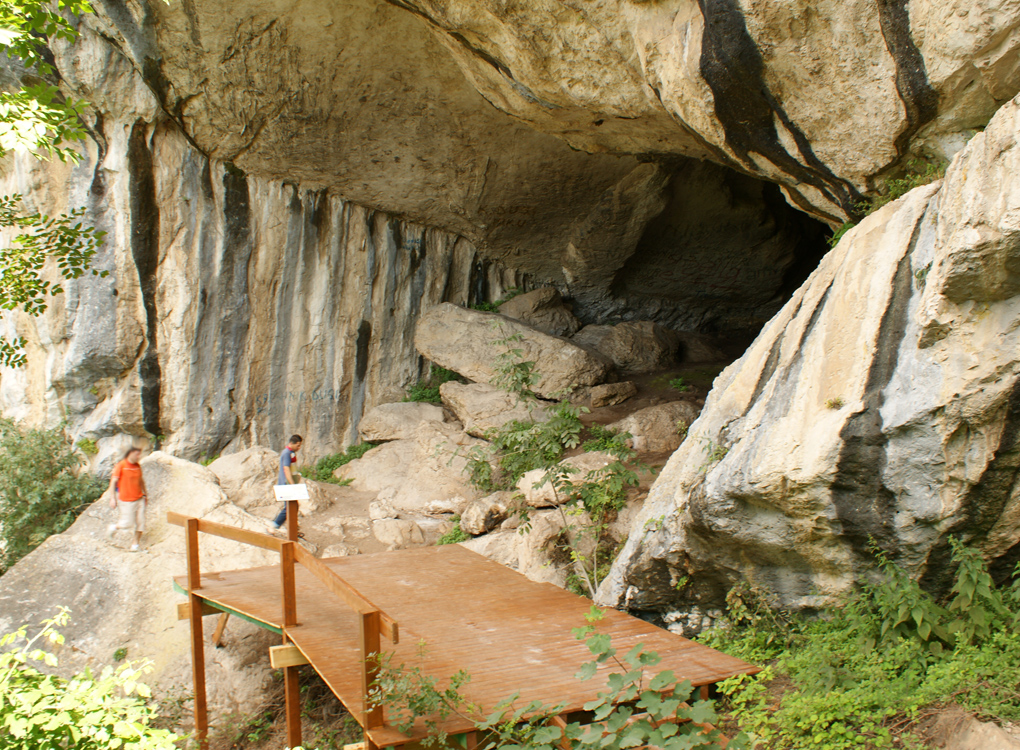
- Cave of Pëllumbas
- Interactive map of Cave of Pëllumbas
- Location: Tirana County
- Nearest city: Tirana
- Coordinates: 41°15′24″N 19°57′53″E
- Designation: Natural Monument
- Governing body: Ministry of Environment

The Cave of Pëllumbas (Albanian: Shpella e Pëllumbasit or Shpella e Zezë) is a karst cave in central Albania, located in the Skorana Gorge close to the village of Pëllumbas in Tirana County. It lies about 500 m (1,600 ft) above the Adriatic, on the slopes of Dajti, a mountain chain that rises to an elevation of 1,613 m (5,292 ft).

The cave has a length of 360 m (1,180 ft) with a width which can vary between 10–15 m (33–49 ft) and a vertical range of 45 m (148 ft). Despite its small size it is regarded as one of the country's most beautiful caves and attracts numerous visitors. The cave is situated within the boundaries of Dajti National Park and has been recognised as a natural monument of national and international importance by the Ministry of Environment. The importance of the complex is due to the remains of ancient human culture which belongs to the Paleolithic. The cave was inhabited by the extinct cave bear, which lived between 10,000 and 400,000 years ago.

== See also ==
- Prehistoric Albania
- Geography of Albania
- Protected areas of Albania
- Dajti National Park
