= Cirme =

Cirme may refer to:

- CIRME, the EPPO code of Cirsium mexicanum
- Mihajas-Cirmë, a village in Tirana County, Albania

== See also ==
- Crime (disambiguation)
