= Bërzhitë =

- Administrative unit
- Location within Albania
- Coordinates: 41°15′N 19°54′E
- Country: Albania
- County: Tirana
- Municipality: Tirana
  - Administrative unit: 68.47 km^{2} (26.44 sq mi)

Population (2023)
  - Administrative unit: 4,291
  - Administrative unit density: 62.67/km^{2} (162.3/sq mi)
- Time zone: UTC+1 (CET)
  - Summer (DST): UTC+2 (CEST)
- Postal Code: 1037
- Area Code: (0)49

Bërzhitë is a village and a former municipality in the Tirana County, central Albania. At the 2015 local government reform it became a municipal unit of the municipality Tirana. The population as of the 2023 census is 4,291.

Historical population
Year	Pop.	±%
1989	5,463	—
2001	5,437	−0.5%
2011	4,973	−8.5%
2023	4,291	−13.7%

The municipal unit consists of the villages Ibë, Ibë e Poshtme, Bërzhitë, Dobresh, Pëllumbas, Mihajas-Cirmë, Kus, Fravesh, Kllojkë, Pashkashesh, Lugë-Shalqizë, Rozaverë. Near it flows the river Erzen.
