= Tujani Castle =

Castle in Tujan, Albania

Tujani Castle (Albanian: Kalaja e Tujanit) is a castle near the village Tujan, in Albania.

== History and description ==
The first fortifications of the castle were built in the early Iron Age. The castle was rebuilt in the 4th century AD.

The castle is close to the Tujan village, in one of the hills that are west of the Mount Dajt. It is a fortification in the form of a rectangle 160 m large and 190 m long. It is divided into three parts by walls that go in a north–south direction. Inside the walls can be seen traces of building with walls 0.8 m large. The eastern side is naturally protected by the rocks and is not surrounded by walls. The technique of reconstruction can be dated to the 4th century AD, but the early construction dates back to the Iron Age.
