= Lana (river) =

River in Albania

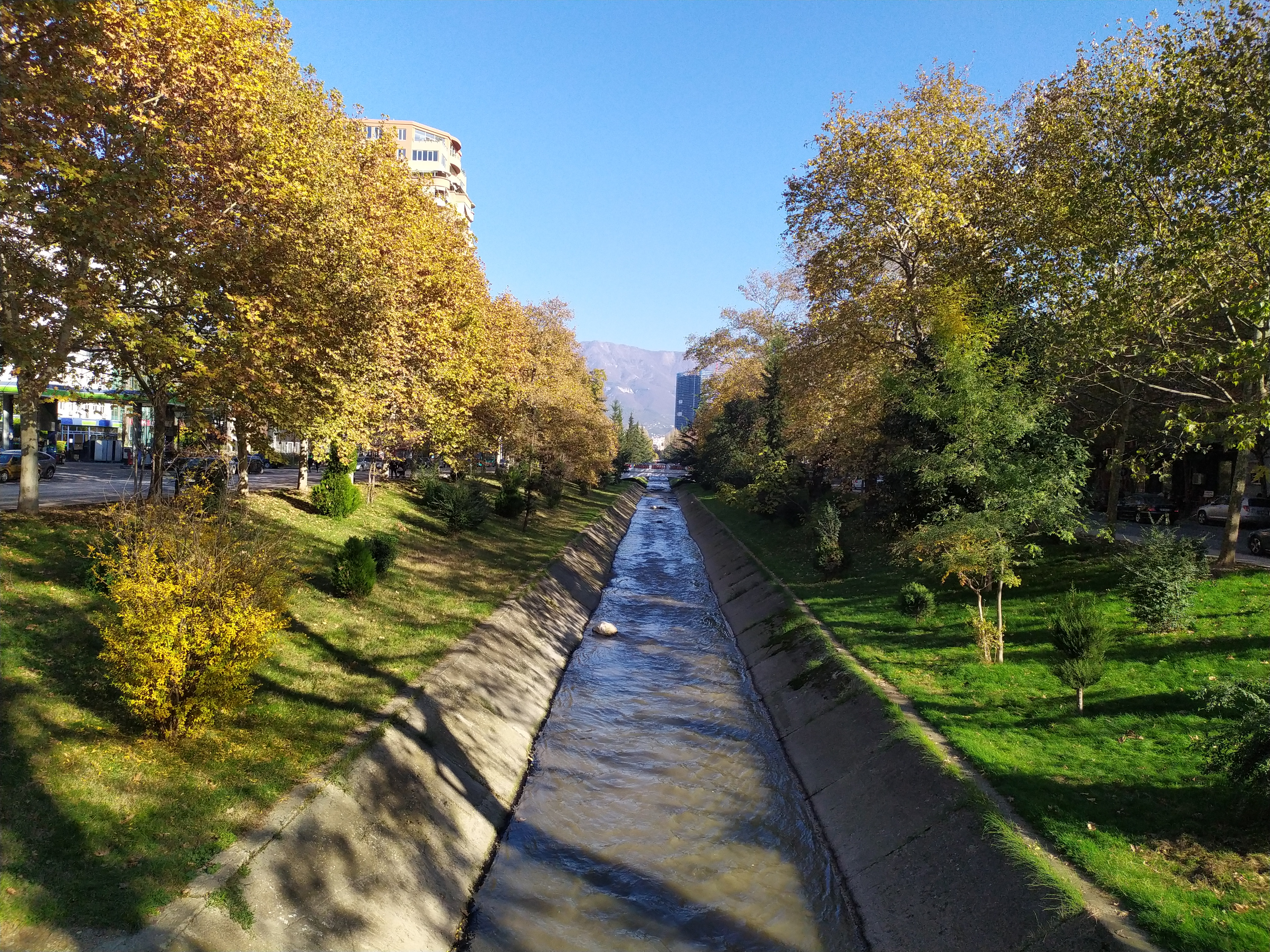
- Lana river stream flowing through Tirana

Location
- Country: Albania

Physical characteristics
- Source
  - location: Lanabregas, Tirana County
- Mouth
  - location: Tiranë River
  - coordinates: 41°23′52″N 19°42′2″E

Basin features
- Progression: Tirana ↝ Ishmi ↝ Adriatic Sea

Lana is a river in central Albania that flows through the city of Tirana. A tributary of the Ishmi river basin, it originates on the western slopes of Qafa e Priskës and traverses the Albanian capital before joining the Tirana River near Bërxullë.

== Course ==
The Lana rises on the western slopes of Qafa e Priskës, east of Tirana. From its source, it descends through the foothills of the Dajti mountains and enters the urban area of the capital. The river flows westward through Tirana before continuing across the surrounding plain and emptying into Tirana River near Bërxullë.

The river is approximately 29 km (18 mi) long and drains a catchment basin of about 67 km² (26 sq mi). The basin has a mean elevation of 179 m (587 ft) above sea level with an average gradient of 24 m/km.

The upper section of the basin, situated on the western flank of Dajti, is characterized by steep terrain and limestone bedrock. In its lower reaches, the relief becomes flatter and consists primarily of sandy and gravelly alluvial deposits.

After entering Tirana, the Lana passes through the city in a regulated channel that has been extensively modified for flood control and urban development. The river follows a concrete-lined course through several municipal units, forming an integral feature of the capital's urban landscape.

== See also ==
- List of rivers of Albania
