= Shtamë Pass =

- Location within Albania

Third Approach
- Coordinates: 41°31′N 19°54′E

Shtamë Pass (Albanian: Qafë-Shtamë; definite:Qafë Shtama) is a mountainous passage close to the village of Selitë, Mat District, Albania. It resides in the Shtamë Pass National Park (Albanian: Parku Kombëtar i Qafë Shtamës), and located within the way between Krujë and Burrel, being closer to the first one.

== See also ==
- Tragedy of Qafë Shtama
