= Institute for Environmental Policy in Albania =

Albanian non-profit organization

The Institute for Environmental Policy or short IEP (Albanian: Instituti i Politikave Mjedisore) is a non-governmental, non-profit organization founded in November 2008 in Tirana, Albania which promotes environmental sustainability in Albania.

== Aims ==
- conduct scientific research and studies in the field of environment;
- develop and implement environmental policy;
- dedication to environmental protection and nature in harmony with life and human activities;
- influencing of the Albanian society towards the protection of nature, efficient use of natural resources, maximizing the use of renewable energy, awareness raising and education of the community regarding global warming and finding ways and methods to fight this phenomenon, awareness raising of the community regarding recycling and finding innovative ways in this field, achieving and sustaining a natural and artificial environment that maximally protects the health of people, combating environmental pollution and restoration of environmentally degraded areas;
- enhance environmental awareness and action to address major environmental threats among the government, the private sector, civil society, and the community;
- develop programs for environmental sustainability and wise management of the environment;
- develop new and strengthening existing legal, economic and policy instruments, institutional frameworks, policy coordination and information exchange, and promoting the involvement of the private environmental policy dialogue and development;
- develop environmental assessment;
- commit to gender equality in all our projects, policies and other activities;
- raise capacities and awareness on sustainable agriculture practices and enhancing awareness on the impact of agriculture and industrial farming on environment, food security and climate change.

== Projects ==
IEP projects are primarily concentrated on (but not limited to) the following areas:

- Climate change
- Sustainable living
- Renewable energy
- Ecosystems and people
- Waste and recycling
- Water management
- Gender and environment
- Organic farming

=== Climate change ===
IEP is trying to raise awareness of the Albanian public and government on the climate change impacts in Albania through various projects and articles in the Albanian media and the international media.

=== Water management ===
IEP has started the construction of a wetland to reduce the nutrients that flow in Tirana River as a pilot project that aims at replication in several other rivers and bodies of water in Albania.

=== Environment and EU integration ===
The project consists on the identification of the problems that Albania will face in the path towards EU integration regarding the environmental aspect. It will also push the policy makers to work more on the environmental sector, as a vital sector not just for the EU integration of Albania, but also for the economy and sustainable development of the country.
