= Tujan =

- Village
- Location within Albania
- Coordinates: 41°23′N 19°53′E
- Country: Albania
- County: Tirana
- Municipality: Tirana
- Administrative unit: Dajt
- Time zone: UTC+1 (CET)
  - Summer (DST): UTC+2 (CEST)

Tujan is a village in the former municipality of Dajt in Tirana County, Albania. At the 2015 local government reform it became part of the municipality Tirana.

== History ==
The Tujan Castle was built by the Illyrians since the Iron age but it fell into ruins before being rebuilt by the Byzantines in the 4th and 6th centuries.
