= Erzen =

River and a tourist attraction in Albania

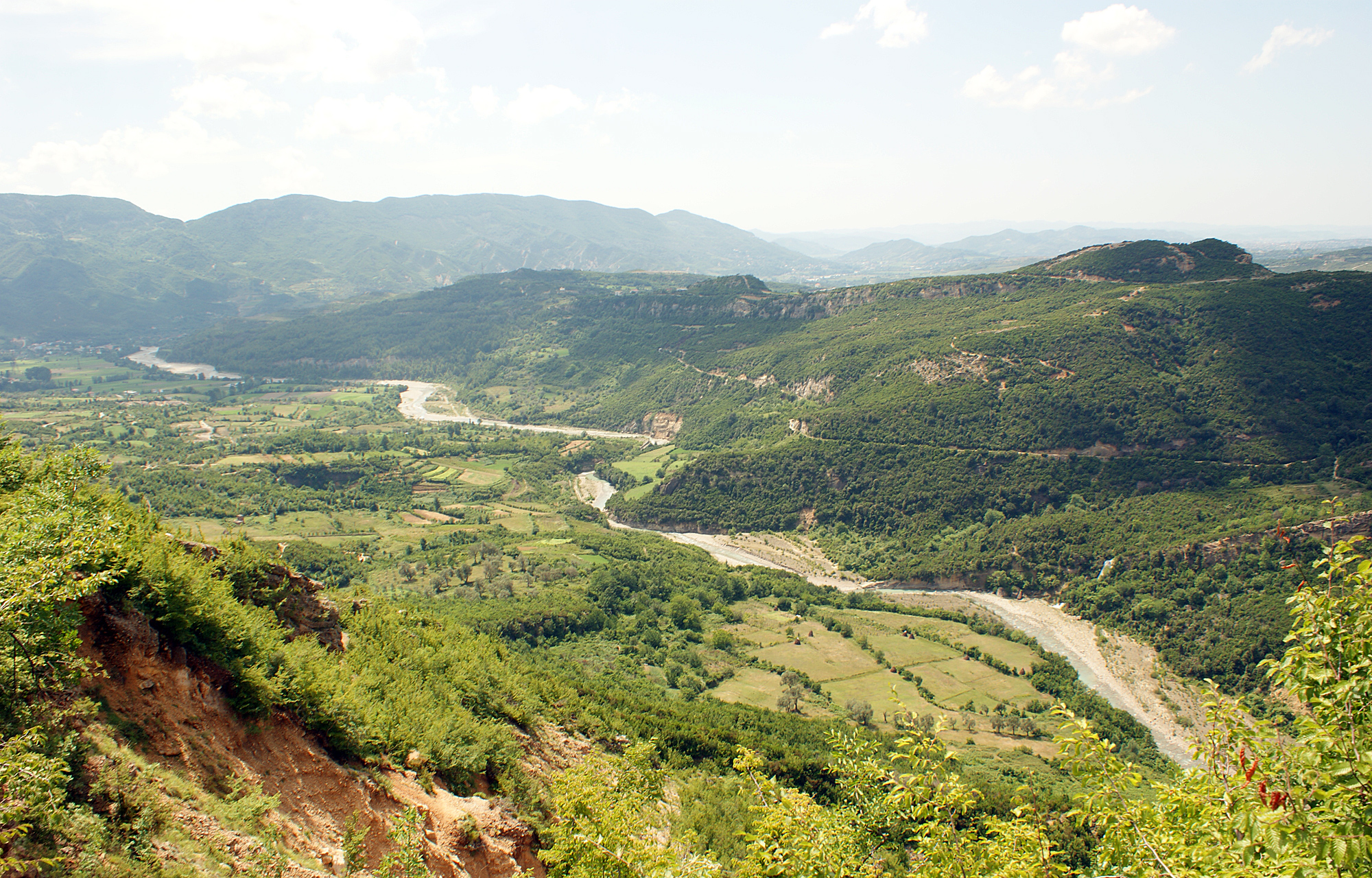
- Erzen flowing near the village of Ibë

Location
- Country: Albania

Physical characteristics
- Source: Mali me Gropa, Shëngjergj
  - location: Tirana County
  - coordinates: 41°19′37″N 20°4′47″E
  - elevation: 1,200 m (3,900 ft)
- Mouth: Lalzi Bay
  - location: Adriatic Sea
  - coordinates: 41°26′13″N 19°27′35″E
  - elevation: 0 m (0 ft)
- Length: 109 km (68 mi)
- Basin size: 760 km^{2} (290 sq mi)

The Erzen (Albanian definite form: Erzeni) is a river in central Albania. The 109 km (68 mi) long Erzen has a 760 km^{2} (290 sq mi) catchment area, including the southern Tirana District and eastern Durrës District.

== Etymology ==
The ancient Illyrian name of the river was Ardaxanos, which is a derivative of *daksa "water", "sea", also found in the name of the island Daxa, of the Illyrian tribe Dassareti and of the Chaonian tribe Dexari. It is mentioned for the first time by Polybius in the 2nd century BC. The contemporary Albanian name Erzen (definite form: Erzeni) evolved from the ancient Ardaxanos through Albanian sound changes.

== Course ==
The river has its origin in the Mali me Gropa 1,200 m (3,900 ft) elevation above sea level and is some 25 km (16 mi) east of Tirana near Shëngjergj, flowing northwest through Petrelë and Sukth to the Adriatic Sea 12 km (7.5 mi) north of Durrës. Significant tributaries of Erzen include Lake Farkë, Korrë, Lanë, Murdhar, Shtërmen and Zhëllimë.

The river passes through the city of Tirana, only a few kilometers from its southern end. Only a small range of hills separates the valley of the Erzen river with the Lana, Tirana, Zeza and Tërkuza rivers that form the Ishëm river. On the southwestern outskirts at Yzberisht the transition from the plane to the Erzen valley is barely perceptible. The mouth is between Durrës and the headland of Cape of Rodon at Lalzi bay. The average discharge rate at the mouth is 18.1 m³ / s, the highest discharge rate for the year exceeds minimum to the eleven-time. Its drainage area which includes all Tirana District and a part of Durrës area is about 700 square km.

Apparently, all twenty-two victims of the 1951 massacre were dumped into the river on Enver Hoxha's orders, only to later be found wrapped tightly in barbed tape.

== Gallery ==
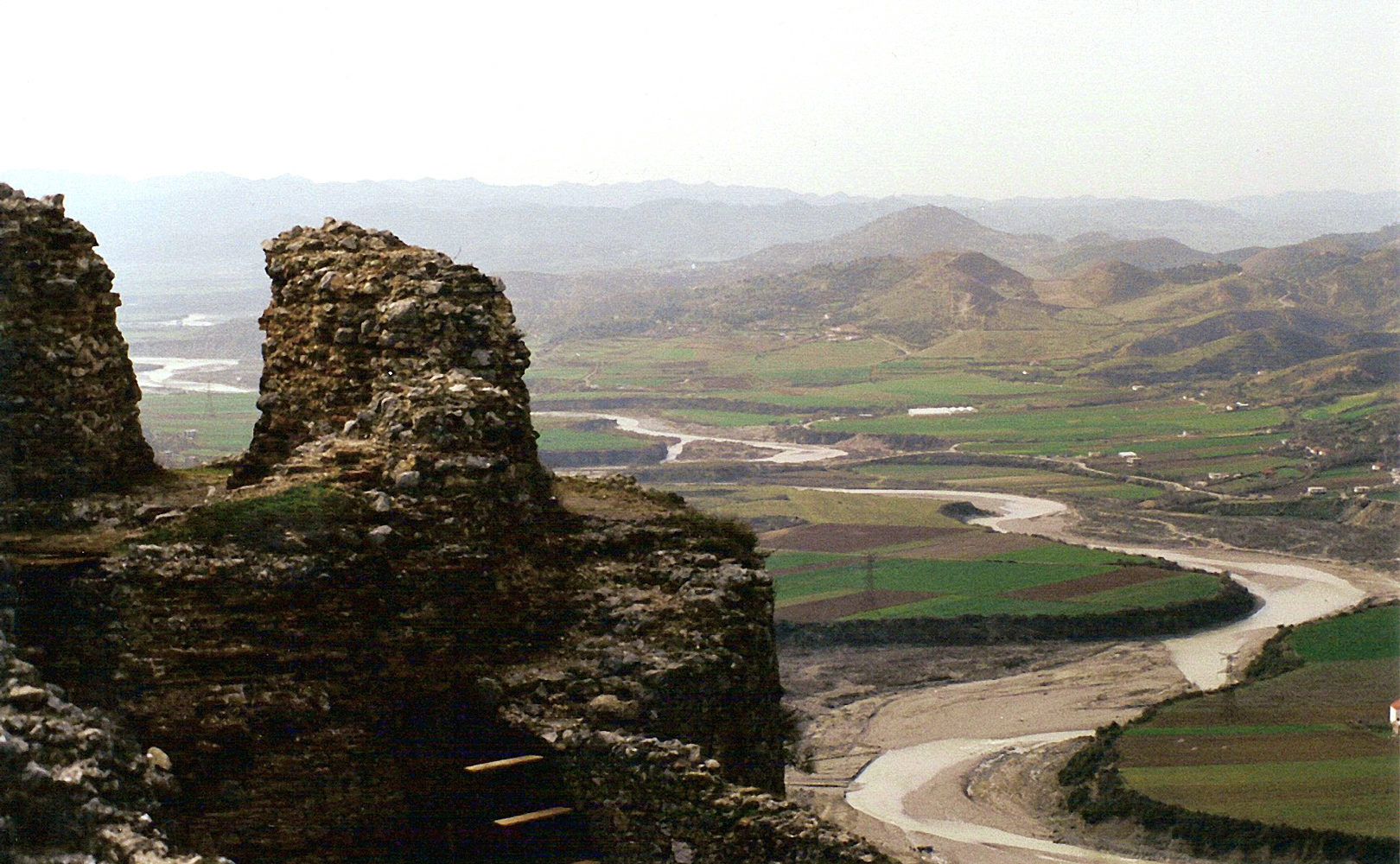
Erzen Valley seen from Petrelë Castle

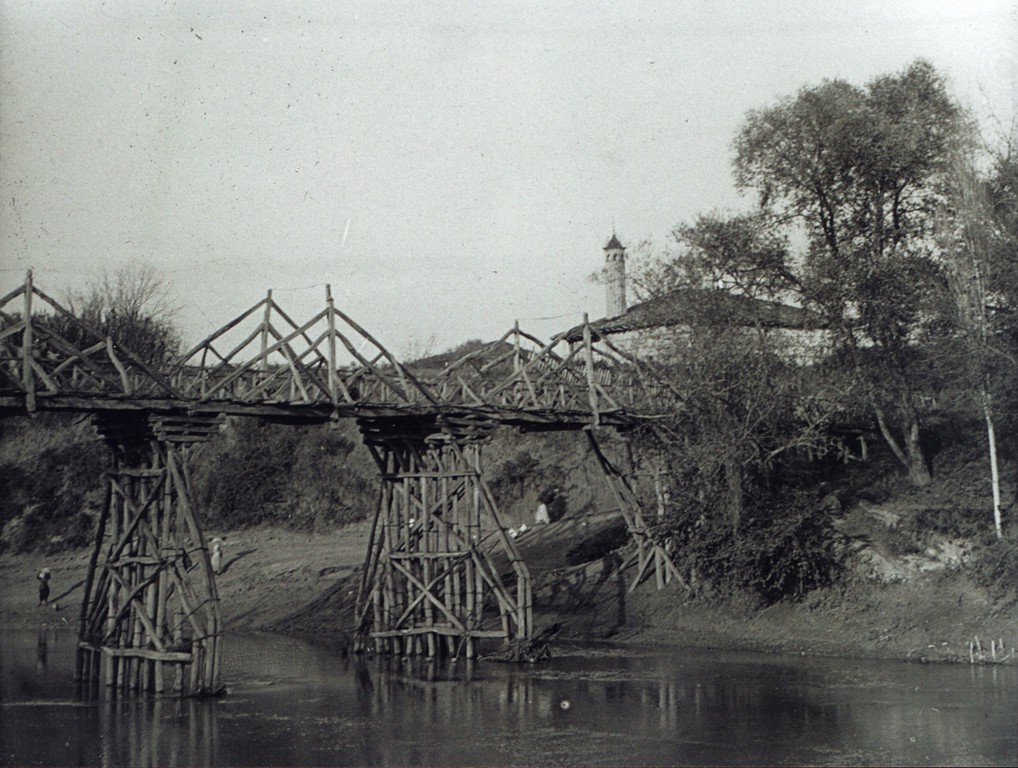
Bridge near Shijak in 1914

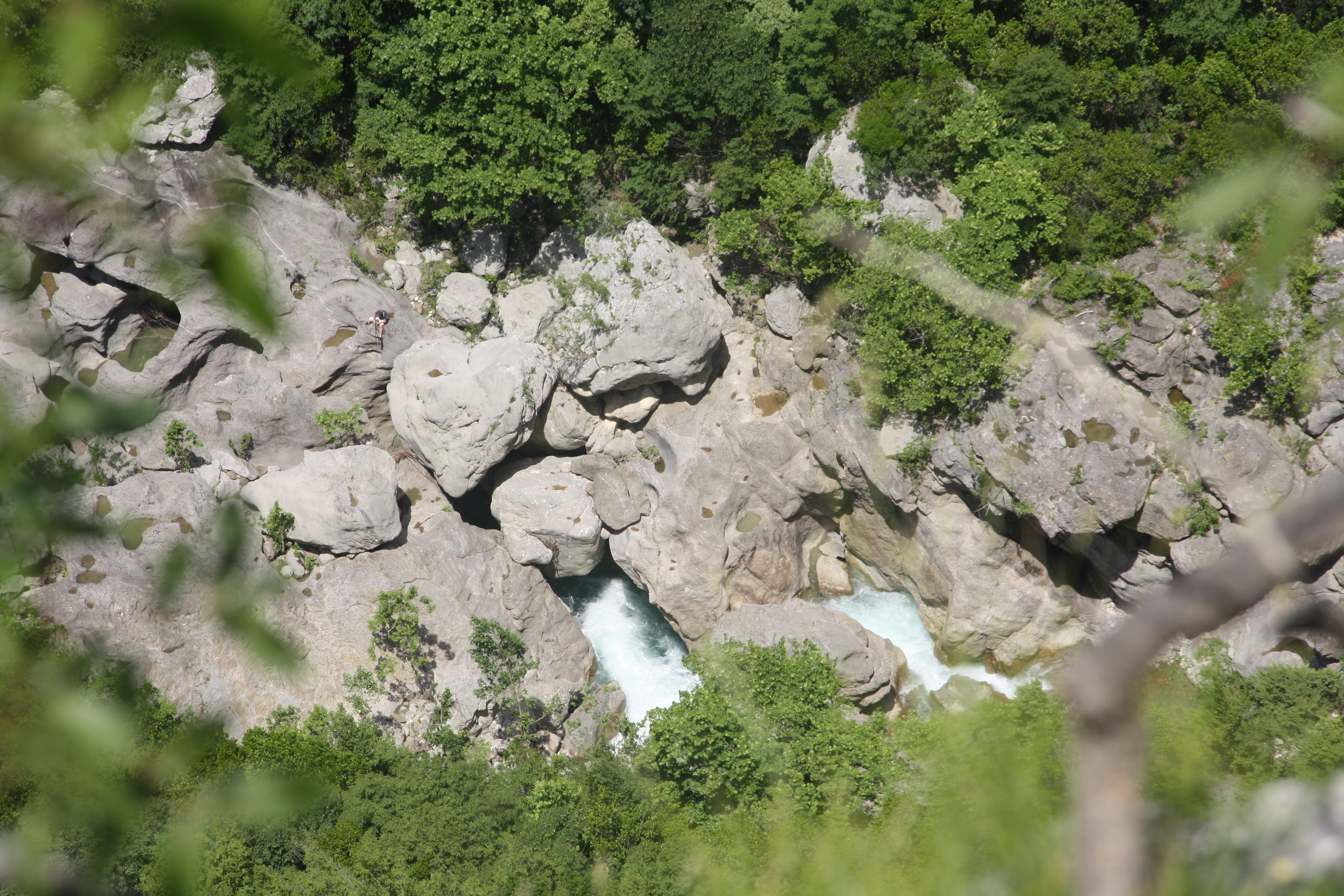
Skorana Gorge

== See also ==
- Geography of Albania
- List of rivers of Albania
