= Shtamë Pass Nature Park =

Protected area in Albania

- IUCN category IV (habitat/species management area)
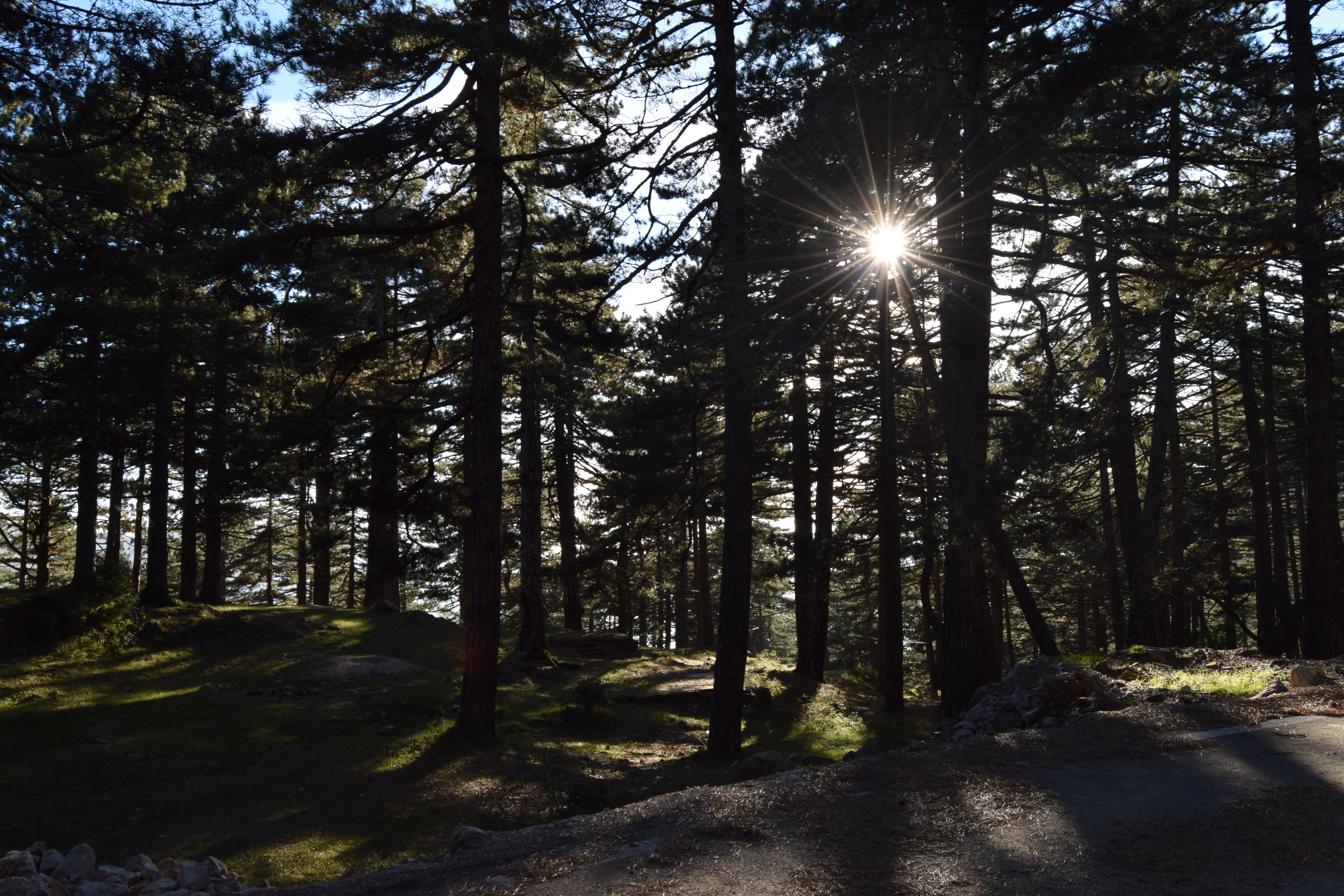

- Location within Albania Location within Europe
- Location: Central Albania
- Nearest city: Krujë
- Coordinates: 41°31′30″N 19°52′20″E
- Area: 6,864.36 ha (16,962.2 acres)
- Established: 15 January 1996
- Governing body: National Agency of Protected Areas

Shtamë Pass Nature Park (Albanian: Parku Natyror i Qafështamës) is a nature reserve residing in the edge of the mountain chain north of Tirana, Albania, about 25 kilometers east of Kruja. The park is named after the Qafë-Shtamë passage, and has an area of 6,864.36 hectares, with a beautiful mountain scenery consisting mainly of pine forests, some small lakes and major water sources. The protected area was established in 1996 by the Albanian government as national park and transformed in 2022 into a larger nature park. The park is home to Qafshtama water bottling company known for its curative properties used since the times of Albanian monarchy. The area is becoming lately a popular attraction for hiking.

The park's name translates as pass Shtama. The road from Kruja to Burrel, runs through the park, on an altitude about 1250 meters.

== Geography and nature ==
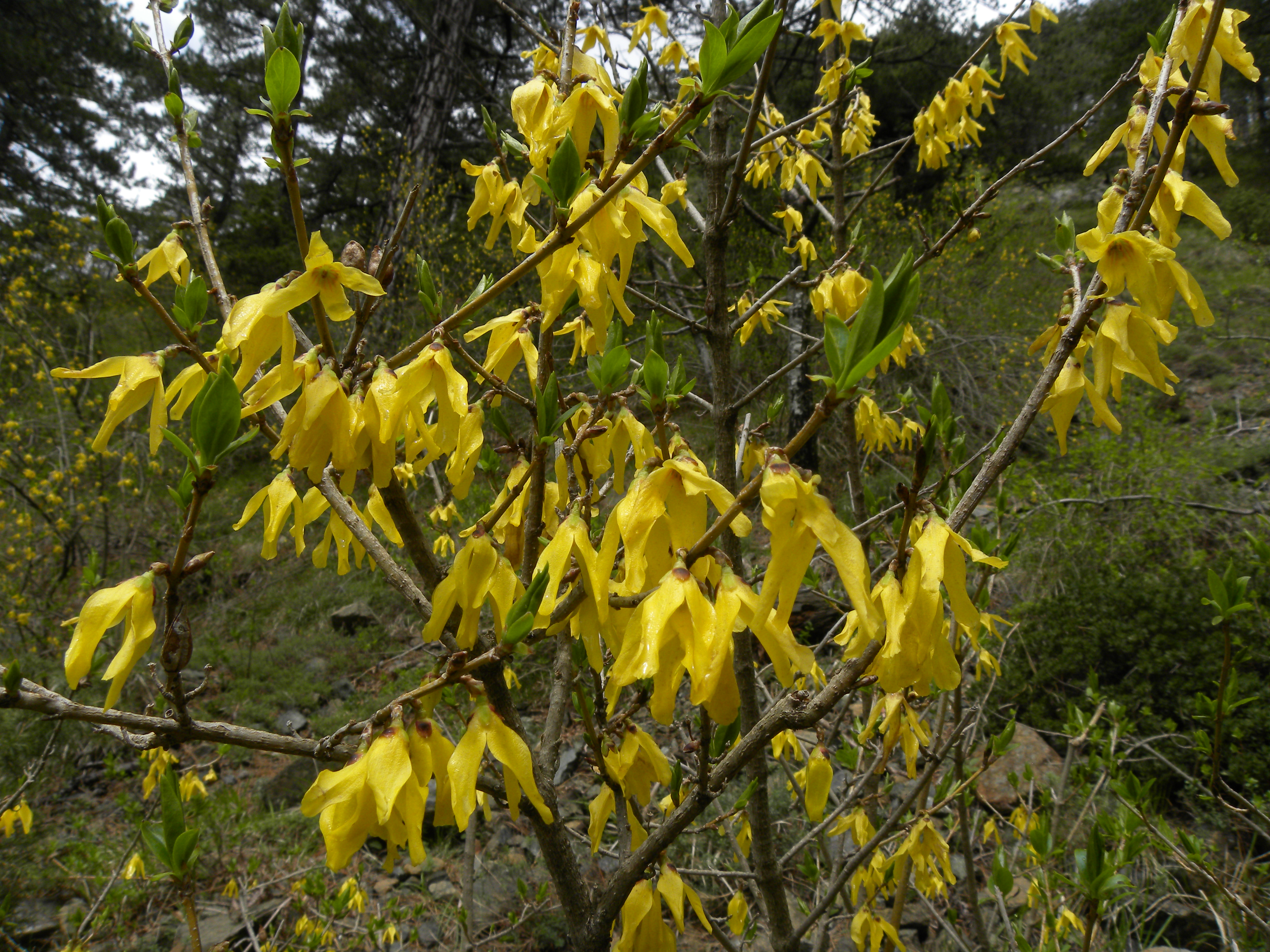
The Forsythia europaea can be found in the Shtamë Pass.

North of the pass road, the majority of the park is mostly undeveloped mountain land with forests, in which pine trees, and oak dominate. The black pines are up to 20 meters high and 60 years old—one of the main wood sources in Albania. The forests provide opportunities for retreat for brown bears, wolves, foxes, and various birds, actually being endangered from illegal deforestation. The highest points on which it rises steeply from the Pass to the north, are the Maja e Liqenit (1724 meters) and the off peak Maja i Rjepat e Qetkolës ( 1686 meters). Maja e Liqenit should not be confused with the peak with the same name in Sharr region of Kosovo. In the southeast, the park is adjacent to the Dajti National Park and in the southwest to the Kraste-Verjon Protected Landscape.

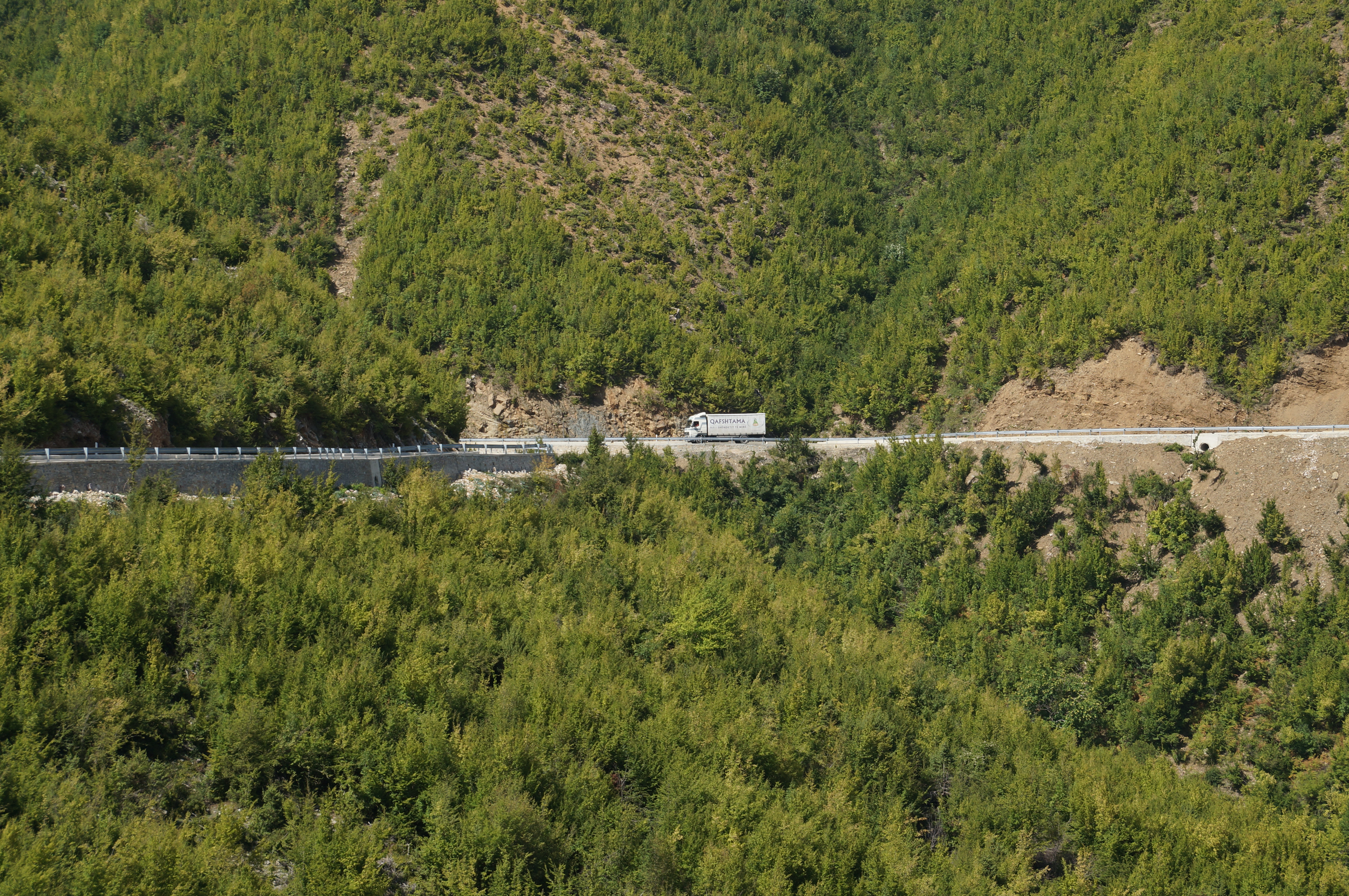
Qafshtama Water delivery truck in Qafe Shtame National Park

The most significant source of water is called Kroi i Nenës Mbretëreshë (Source of the Queen Mother), known for its clean, clear and healthy water. The legend refers to the Albanian Royal Family, allegedly daily supply from this water source would be after of a laboratory in Vienna had awarded it as the best water in the country in 1932 by performing laboratory tests. The word Queen Mother probably points at Sadije Toptani, the mother of Ahmet Zogu, or Geraldine Apponyis, his wife, who had first visited Albania in 1937. Nena Mbretëreshë is a common name for the king's mother. King Zog, was born in Mat region, originating from the east side of the pass. He is said to have also build a recreation villa in the area.
The water is also collected and taken to a bottling plant, residing a little further down from the park entrance. The produced bottled mineral water is sold nationwide under the brand Qafshtama.

On 29 April 1997, an underground bunker complex on the east side of the pass was the home of a serious accident. An explosion took place in the tunnels full of ammunition and weapons, which had been stored in a military storage site during the communist era. The sites were dismantled in the 1990s. As a result of the collapse of public order, several people tried to disassemble metals to sell, without applying any care or having proper military knowledge. As a result, there was an explosion in the tunnel. 23 people were killed, including many young people from a nearby village of Selishtë

== See also ==
- Geography of Albania
- Biodiversity of Albania
- Environment of Albania
- Tragedy of Qafë Shtama
