= Environment of Albania =

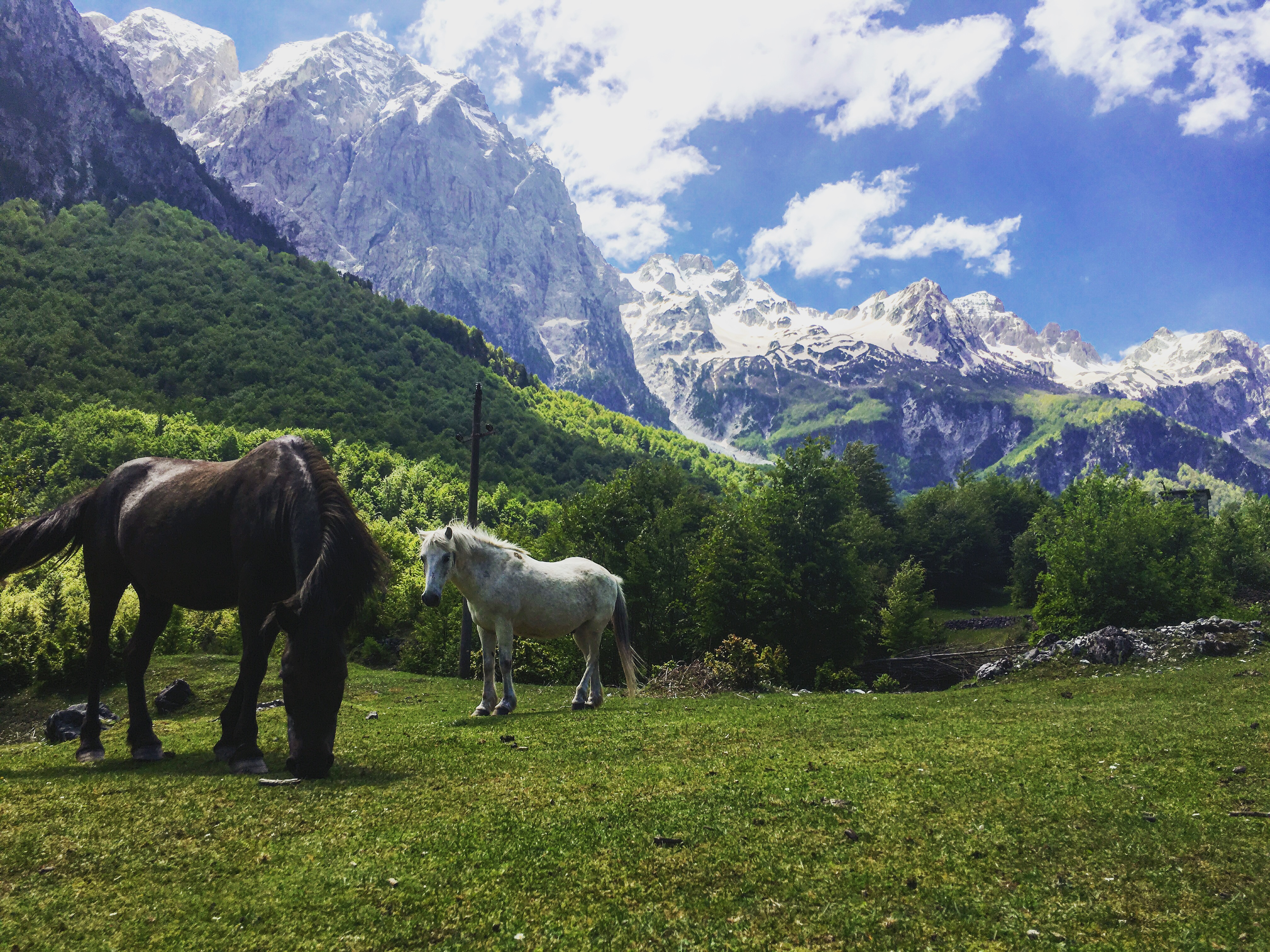
The Valbonë Valley National Park in northern Albania.

The environment of Albania is characterised by unique flora and fauna and a variety of landforms contained within a small nation. It also consists of different ecoregions, which represent the natural geographical ecosystem, water systems, weather, renewable resources and influences upon them.

Of the factors caused by human intervention that can affect this environment, activities that sustain the economy of Albania such as mining and forestry are notably influential. The environment strongly influences public health in Albania, as for example air pollution and smog in urban areas such as in Tirana can result in great distress for those with respiratory conditions such as asthma.

== Geography ==
Albania is a small predominantly mountainous country between Southeastern and Southern Europe, on facing the Adriatic and [[Ionian n Sea|Ionian sea]]s within the Mediterranean Sea. It has a total area of 28,748 square kilometres (11,100 square miles), bordering Montenegro to the northwest, Kosovo to the northeast, Macedonia to the east and Greece to the south. It lies between latitudes 42° and 39° N and between longitudes 21° and 19° E. Its coastline length is 476 km (296 mi) and extends along the Adriatic and Ionian Seas.

== Climate ==
With Albania's coastline facing the Adriatic and Ionian seas, its highlands backed upon the elevated Balkan landmass, and the entire country lying at a latitude subject to a variety of weather patterns during the winter and summer seasons, Albania has a high number of climatic regions for such a small area. The coastal lowlands have typically mediterranean climate; the highlands have a continental climate. In both the lowlands and the interior, the weather varies markedly from north to south.

Inland temperatures are affected more by differences in elevation than by latitude or any other factor. Low winter temperatures in the mountains are caused by the continental air mass that dominates the weather in Eastern Europe and the Balkans. Northerly and northeasterly winds blow much of the time. Average summer temperatures are lower than in the coastal areas and much lower at higher elevations, but daily fluctuations are greater. Daytime maximum temperatures in the interior basins and river valleys are very high, but the nights are almost always cool.

== Biodiversity ==
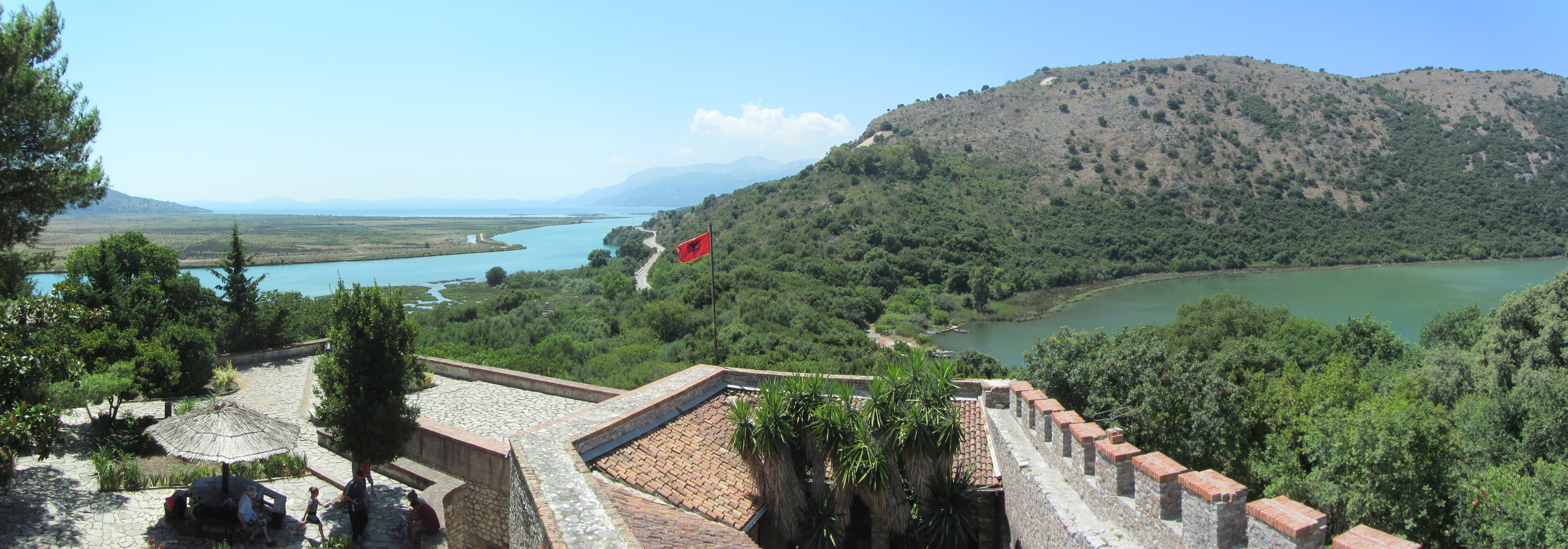
Butrint National Park, a UNESCO World Heritage Site

Phytogeographically, Albania is part of the Boreal kingdom specifically, part of the Illyrian province of the Circumboreal Region and Mediterranean region within the Boreal kingdom. Albania is divided into three ecoregions including Illyrian deciduous forests, Dinaric mixed forests, Balkan mixed forests and Pindus mixed forests. Further, Biomes in Albania include Temperate broadleaf and mixed forest and Mediterranean forests, woodlands, and scrub, that are all in the Palearctic realm. Due to its climatic, hydrological, geological and topographical conditions, Albania is one of the richest in Europe in terms of biodiversity. Almost 30% of the entire flora and 42% fauna in the entire European continent can be found in Albania.

There are 799 Albanian protected areas, which covers a surface of 4,600 square kilometres (460,000 hectares). These include 15 national parks, 5 protected landscape areas, 29 nature reserves, 4 protected resource areas and 750 nature monuments. The national parks covering a surface area of 210,668.48 hectares (2,106.6848 km^{2}) or roughly 13.65% of the overall territory. The nation host also 8 archaeological parks covering a surface area of 1,120 hectares (11.2 km^{2}). The largest national park in Albania is the Fir of Hotova National Park, covering a surface area of 34,361 hectares (343.61 km^{2}) and having the largest area of Bulgarian Fir in the Balkans. Other large national parks includes the Butrint National Park, Karaburun-Sazan National Marine Park, Divjaka-Karavasta National Park, Prespa National Park, Shebenik-Jabllanice National Park, and others.

== See also ==
- Environmental issues in Albania
