= Dajti Mountain National Park =

National park and a tourist attraction in Albania

- Parku Kombëtar Mali i Dajtit
- IUCN category II (national park)
- Official logo

- Location within Albania Location within Europe
- Location: Tirana County
- Nearest city: Tirana
- Coordinates: 41°21′57″N 19°55′32″E
- Area: 28,561.85 hectares (285.6185 km^{2})
- Designated: 21 June 2006
- Governing body: National Agency of Protected Areas

Dajti Mountain National Park (Albanian: Parku Kombëtar Mali i Dajtit) is a national park established in 1966 in central Albania, spanning an area of 293.84 km^{2} (113.45 sq mi) since 2006. The park is 40 km (25 mi) east of the Adriatic Sea and 26 km (16 mi) east of Tirana. The area is under shared jurisdiction between Albanian Agency of Protected Areas (AKZM) and Tirana Municipality Parks and Recreation Agency (APR). It is adjacent to Shtamë Pass Nature Park to the northwest, Kraste-Verjon Protected Landscape to the west, and Mali me Gropa-Bizë-Martanesh Protected Landscape to the east. The park is marked by an extremely fragmented, rugged topography which creates favourable conditions for a great diversity of ecosystems and biodiversity.

The International Union for Conservation of Nature (IUCN) has listed the park as Category II. The park has been recognised as an Important Plant Area of international importance by Plantlife.

In 2019, the new Dajti Mountain National Park tourist information centre was opened, located near the TV and Radio towers along SH47 road in Fushe Dajt.

The area is known for Dajti Ekspres Cable Car and Adventure Park in addition to the area’s long standing traditional restaurants serving local dishes according to the slow food tradition. Mount Dajti is accessed by taking the Dajti Ekspres Cable Car from the eastern edge of Tirana. A 15-to-20-minute public bus ride is taken from the city center to the lower station, where a 15-minute, 4.7-kilometer scenic ride to the mountaintop Llarka Plateau is provided.

== Geology ==
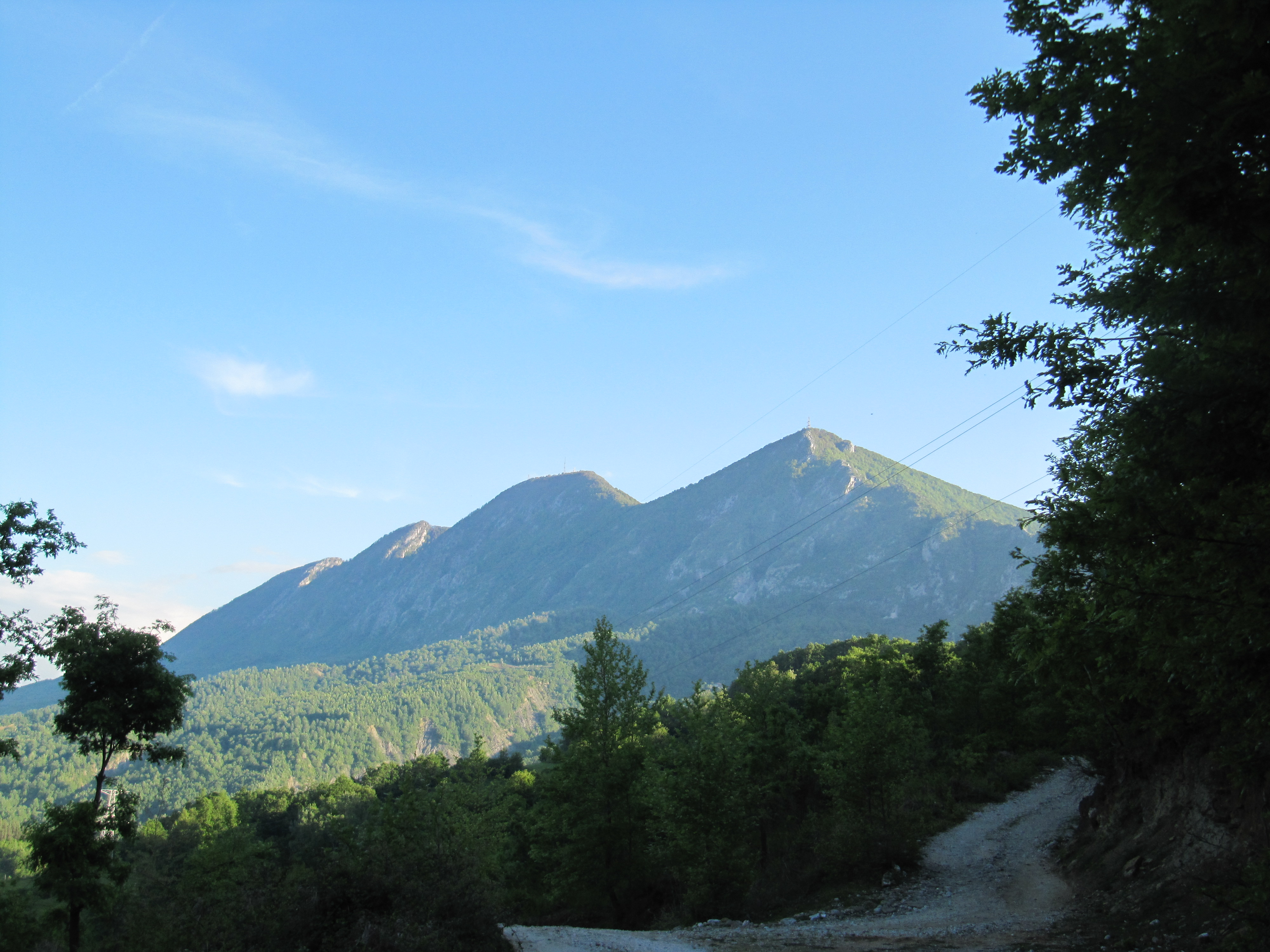
Dajti from the east

Dajti massif, a mountain chain that rises to an elevation of 1,613 m (5,292 ft), comprises besides Dajti, Priska to the south, Tujani in the center and Brari to the north. Climbers of the mountain can view down into the city of Tirana and over the mountains of the region. Due to the panoramic view, this place has been named as the Balcony of Tirana. One of Tirana's main water sources, Lake Bovilla, is located to the northeast of Brar with steep cliffs and a canyon. On the other extremity of the park along Erzen River is found the prehistoric Pellumbas Cave located in the Skorana Gorge, which has been formed by the river. Another natural attraction is the Shëngjini Waterfalls located near Shëngjergj village.

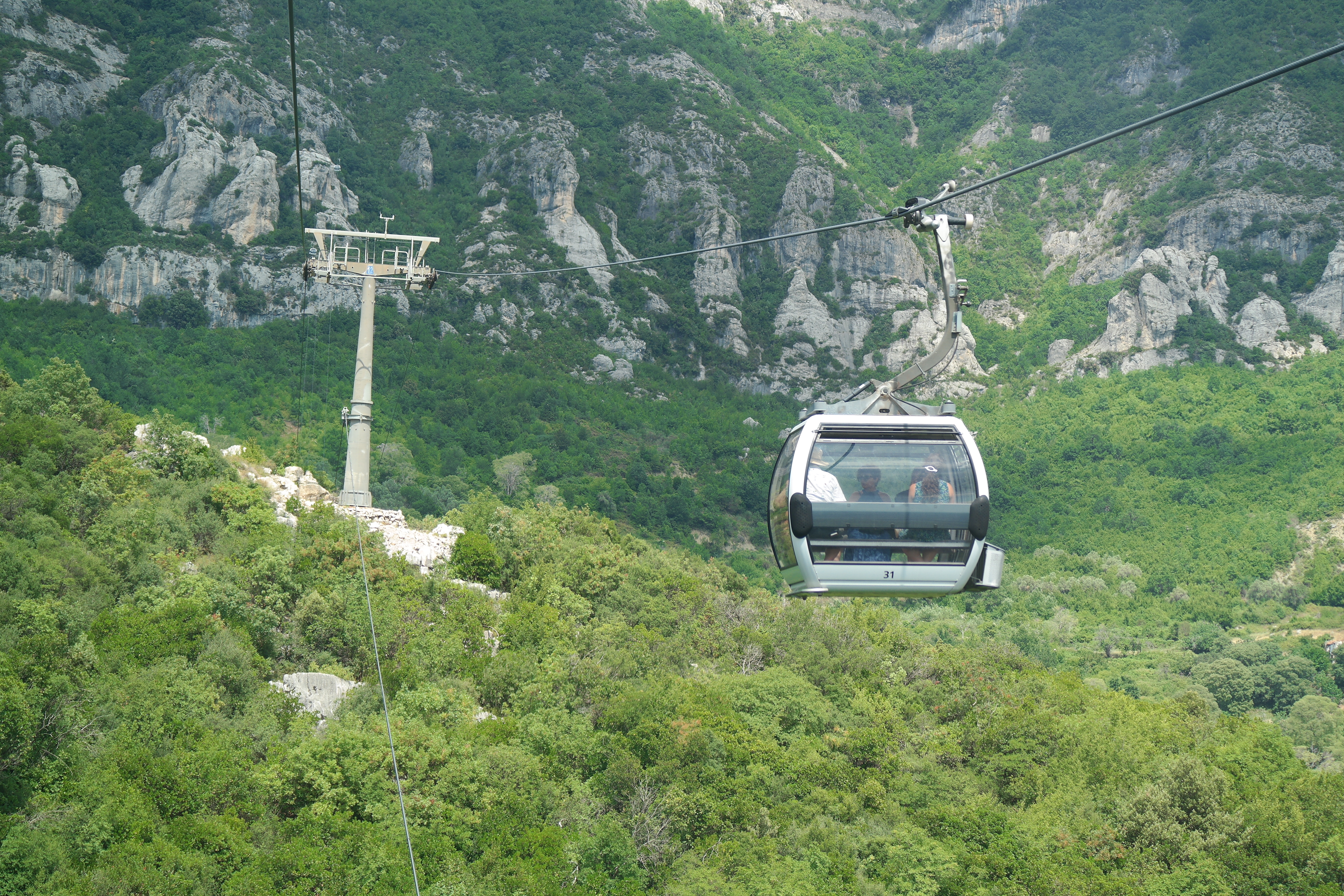
Dajti Ekspres Cable Car

== Flora and fauna ==
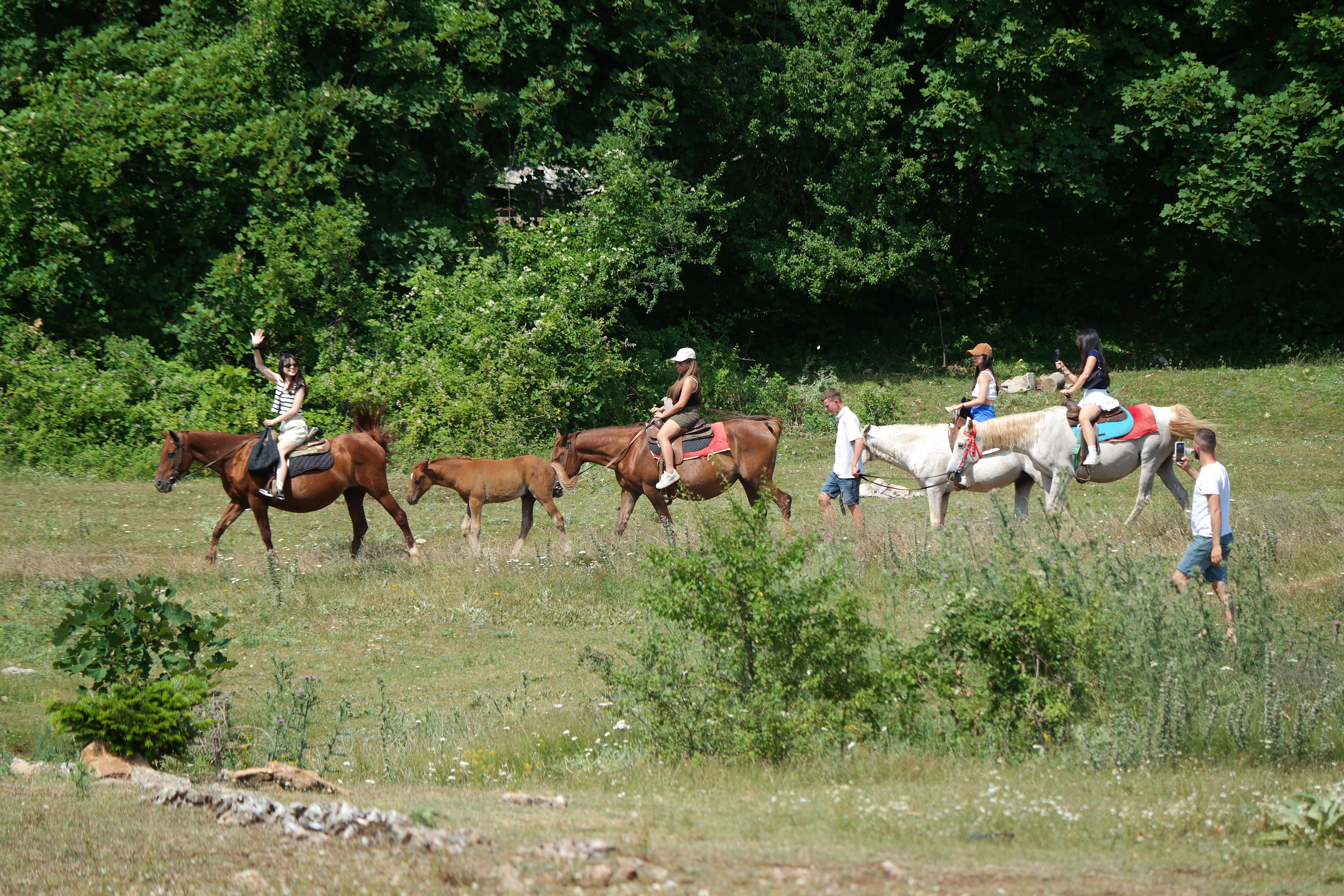
Horse riding in the Dajti Mountain National Park

Dajti's varied geology and topography have resulted in a variety of flora and fauna. In addition to the forests and mountain landscapes with many wild flowers, numerous mammals are protected as well. The park is inhabited by wild boar, Eurasian wolf, red fox, European hare, brown bear, squirrel, and European wildcat. In the lower part of the mountains, the vegetation consists of scrubland and heath, myrtle and fragaria. Oak dominates at around 600-1,000 m altitude interspersed with beech and maple forests and some conifers above 1,000 m altitude. The rocky top has little vegetation.

=== Forest fires and deforestation ===
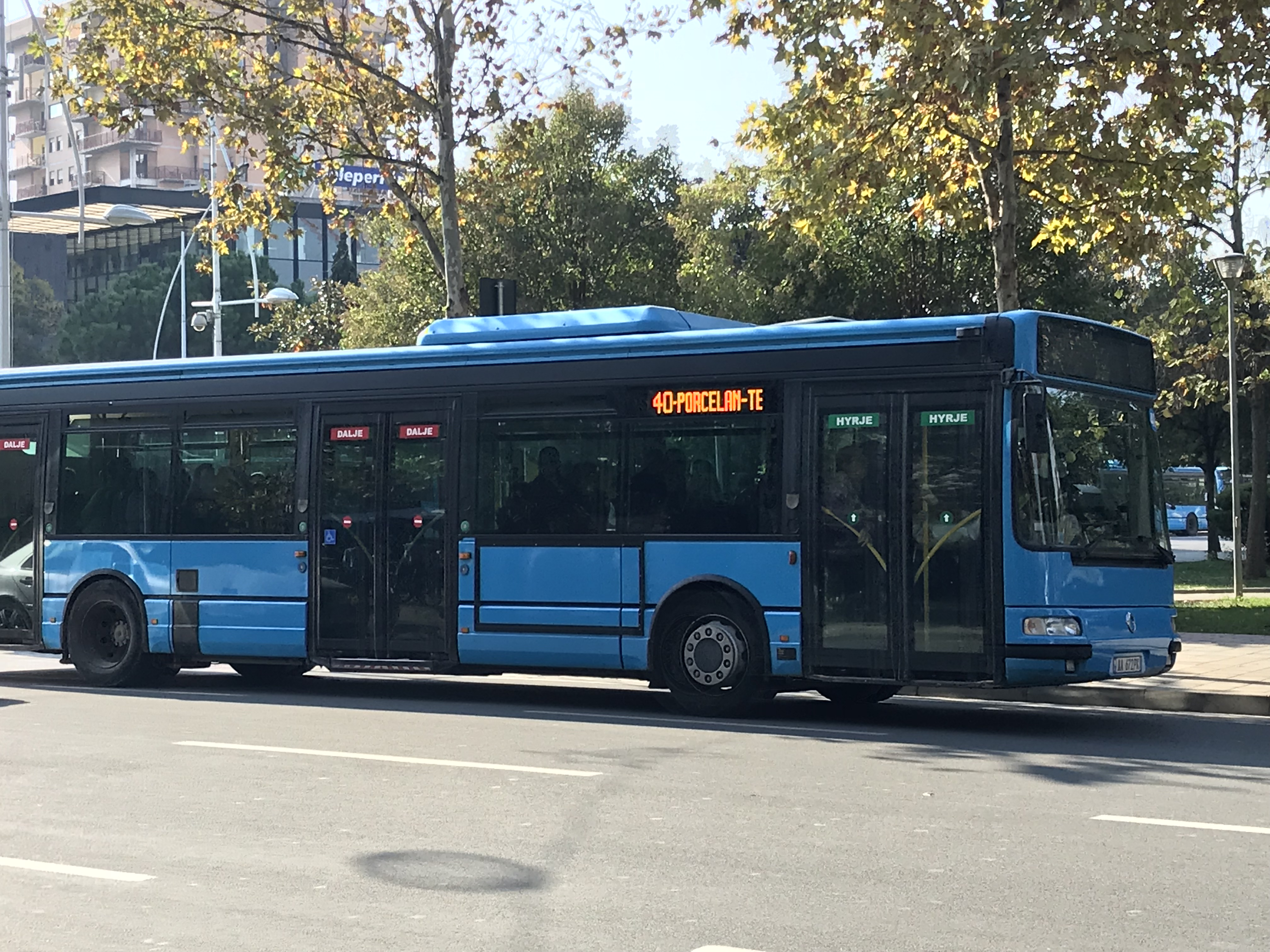
Bus line serving Dajti Mt Cable Car in Tirana

In the 2010s, deforestation has become a major problem on the mountain. In the summer of 2012 and spring 2019, forest fires burned down 10 ha of forests at the Priska summit and partially Dajti in 2017, requiring authorities to extinguish it only with the help of helicopters. The damage was extensive at the summits and can be clearly seen from Tirana.

Forest fires are happening more frequently every year, while those responsible are not being convicted.

== See also ==
- Geography of Albania
- Protected areas of Albania
- Dajti Mountain
