= Farka Lake =

- Liqeni i Farkës (Albanian)
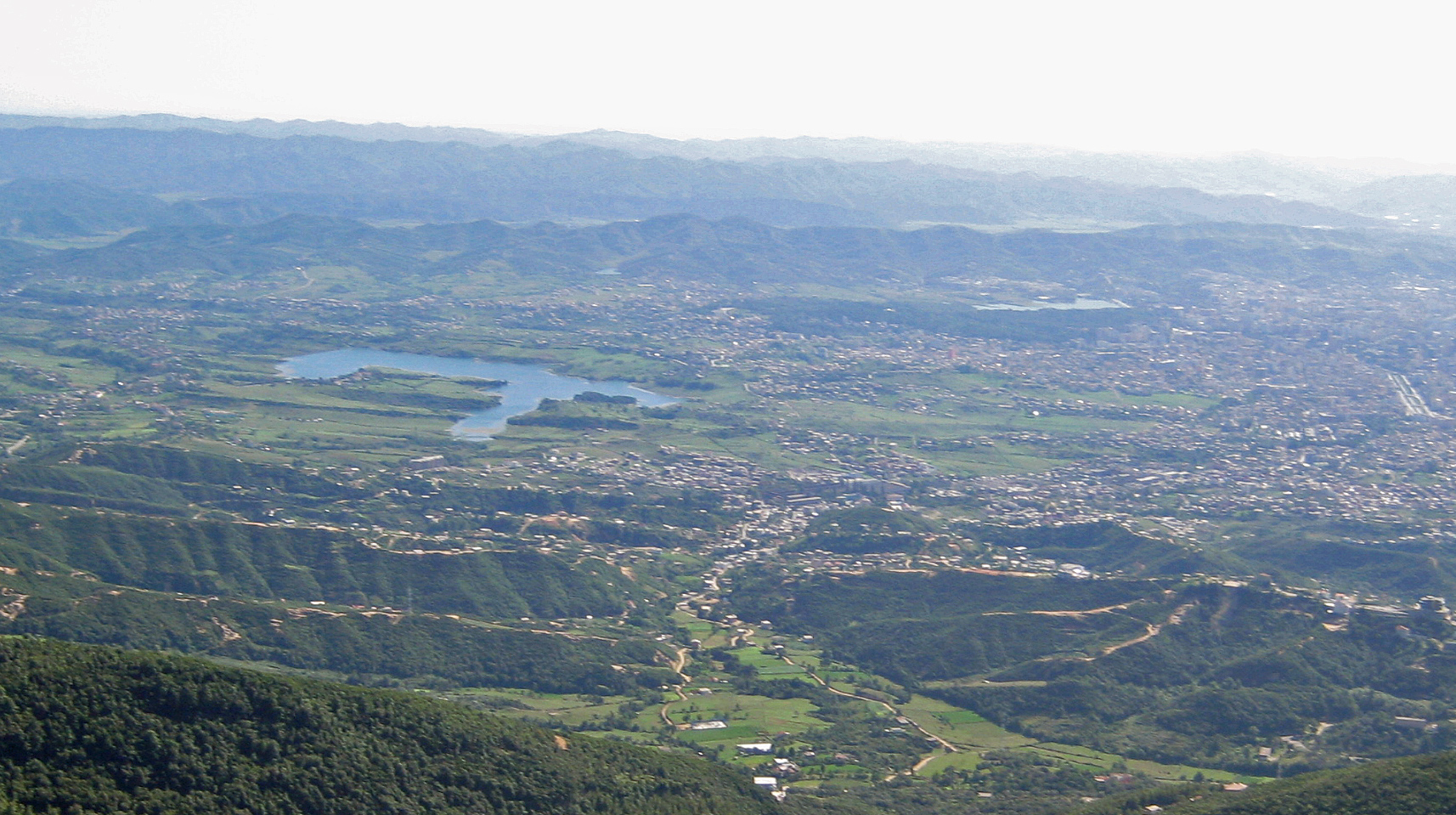
- View of the lake from the distance.

- Location within Albania
- Interactive map of Farka Lake
- Location: Farka
- Coordinates: 41°18′53″N 19°51′38″E
- Lake type: Artificial Lake
- Basin countries: Albania
- Max. length: 2 km (1.2 mi)
- Max. width: 700 m (2,300 ft)
- Surface area: 75 ha (190 acres)
- Settlements: Tirana

The Farka Lake (Albanian: Liqeni i Farkës) is an artificial lake and municipal park in the southeast of Tirana, Albania. It is about 9.6 km away from the city centre of Tirana, and is administered by the Agency of Parks and Recreation of the Municipality of Tirana.

== Geography ==
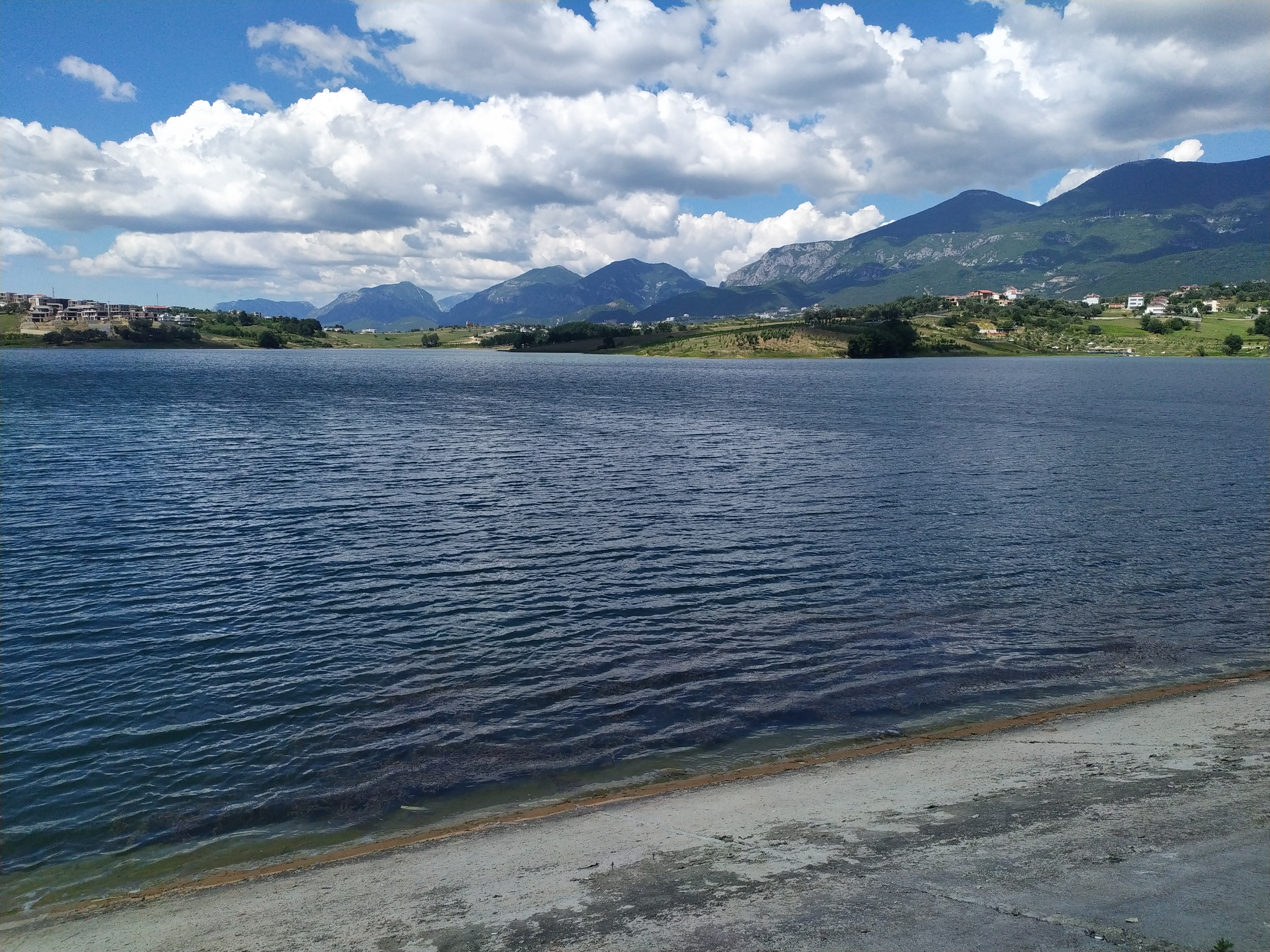
Farka Lake overlooking Dajti Mt

The lake is about 75 hectare, larger than the Artificial Lake of Tirana. It has a maximum length of two kilometers as well as a maximum width of 700 meters. The dam at the south is about 300 metres long.

== See also ==
- Tirana
- Landmarks in Tirana
