= Prehistoric Albania =

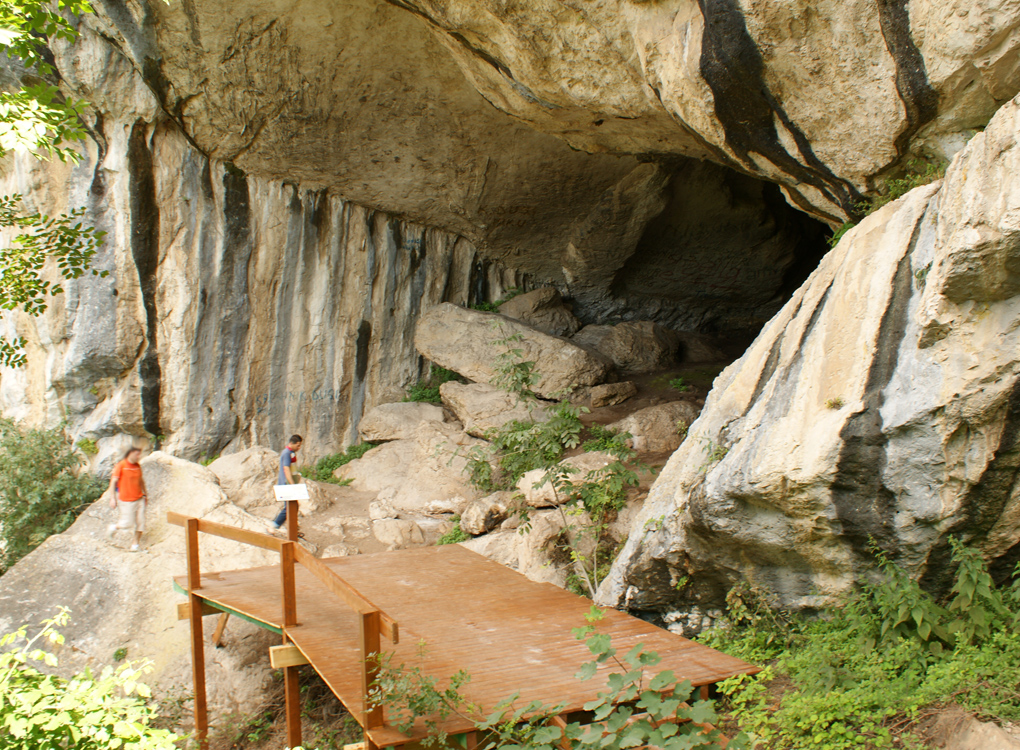
The Cave of Pellumbas near Tirana, used as a settlement for ancient humans during the Middle Paleolithic period.

Prehistoric Albania, compared to the other regions of the Mediterranean Europe, was relatively lately inhabited by Homo sapiens. The earliest known human settlement dates back to the Upper Paleolithic, 40,000 BC in the Kryegjata Valley, near the antique site of Apollonia. Several further Paleolithic sites have been excavated, out of which the most prominent ones are the cave of Konispol (24,700 BC), the flint tools found near Xarrë, the shelters of the Blaz Cave near Urakë and the habitation of Mount Dajt, then during the period of the Mesolithic the aforementioned Kryegjata, Konispol and Gajtan sites represent more developed stone, flint and horn tools. Another important site of the Mesolithic industrial activity is the flint mine of Goranxi that was in operation around 7,000 BC.

The excavation project of the prehistoric settlement of Vashtëmi was completed in 2013, and the results thereof confirmed that it was one of the earliest farming sites in Europe, dating back to 6,600 BC, long before the Neolithic Agricultural Revolution would have reached the region. Vashtëmi was situated near the Devoll river feeding the Maliq Lake, a region that became the cradle of the most prominent Neolithic culture of present-day Albania: the Maliq culture. It initially included the settlements of Vashtëmi, Dunavec, Maliq and Podgorie. Their artifacts, pottery and spiritual culture spread through the valleys, and by the end of the Lower Neolithic it covered a sizeable area including the territory of the modern Eastern Albania. The human settlements of the western parts of the present-day country were rather connected to the archaeological cultures of the Adriatic Sea and the Danube valley. During the Middle Neolithic, 5th–4th millennia BC achievement of a cultural unity was underway, which was represented by the prevailing black and grey polished pottery, four-footed ceramic ritual objects and Mother Earth figurines across the contemporary sites of Dunavec–Maliq, Cakran, Kolsh and Xarrë. This unity became even more evident during the Late Neolithic, due to the more intensive relationships between the settlements that helped the widespread adaptation of the new technological inventions and processing methods (hoe, mill stone, primitive spinning wheel), ceramics painted with two or three colors (typically red and black), featuring elaborated designs and patterns.

With the Chalcolithic, in the second half of 3rd millennium BC the first tools made of copper emerged and helped the contemporary man be more efficient in agricultural and industrial activities. The ceramic pottery continued the Neolithic tradition from both typological and technological aspect, yet it adapted some of the methods and patterns of the other cultures on the Balkan Peninsula. At the same time the man of the epoch was witnessing the great Indo-European migrations of the Proto-Indo-Europeans leaving their homeland in the Eastern European steppes and spreading towards Asia and Europe. Based on the archaeological findings and facts the leading Albanian archaeologist Muzafer Korkuti stated that although these nomadic migrants brought along their culture into the eastern part of the Balkans, yet they were blended with the local indigenous population which by the end of the Copper Age ended up in the formation of an ethnocultural basis of the later Illyrians.

== Sources ==
- Allen, Susan E.; Gjipali, Ilir (2014). "New light on the early Neolithic period in Albania: The Southern Albania Neolithic Archaeological Project (SANAP), 2006–2013". Proceedings of the International Congress of Albanian Archaeological Studies : 65th anniversary of Albanian archaeology (21–22 November, Tirana 2013). Tiranë. p. 107-119. ISBN 9789928141286.
- Ceka, Neritan (2013). The Illyrians to the Albanians. Tirana: Nigjeni. ISBN 9789928407467.
- Fouache, Éric; Ghilardi, Matthieu (31 December 2011). "Human societies and environmental changes since the Neolithic in Greece and Albania". Méditerranée (117): 35–43. doi:10.4000/mediterranee.5887.
- Gilkes, Oliver J. (2013). Albania : an archaeological guide. London: I.B. Tauris. ISBN 9781780760698.
- Korkuti, Muzafer (2007). Spataro and, Michela; Biagi, Paolo (eds.). The Early Neolithic of Albania in a Balkan perspective. In A short walk through the Balkans: The first farmers of the Carpathian Basin and adjacent regions. Trieste: Società per la Preistoria e Protostoria della Regione Friuli-Venezia Giulia. p. 113–117.
- Templer, Michael (2016). What happened to the Southern European hunter-gatherers at the advent of farming, between Western Anatolia and the head of the Adriatic Sea (9000–4500 BC)? A narrative description based on the archaeological record (PhD). Université de Neuchâtel.
- Wilkes, J. J. (1992). The Illyrians. Cambridge, Mass., USA: B. Blackwell. ISBN 0631146717.
