= Pëllumbas, Tirana =

Pëllumbas
- Village
- Location within Albania
- Coordinates: 41°15′N 19°57′E
- Country: Albania
- County: Tirana
- Municipality: Tirana
- Administrative unit: Bërzhitë
- Time zone: UTC+1 (CET)
  - Summer (DST): UTC+2 (CEST)
- Postal Code: 1037

Pëllumbas ("pigeon" in Albanian) is a village in the former municipality of Bërzhitë in Tirana County, Albania. At the 2015 local government reform it became part of the municipality Tirana. As of 2026, the population of Pëllumbas is 466 people.

== See also ==
- Pëllumbas cave
