= Ishëm (river) =

River in Albania

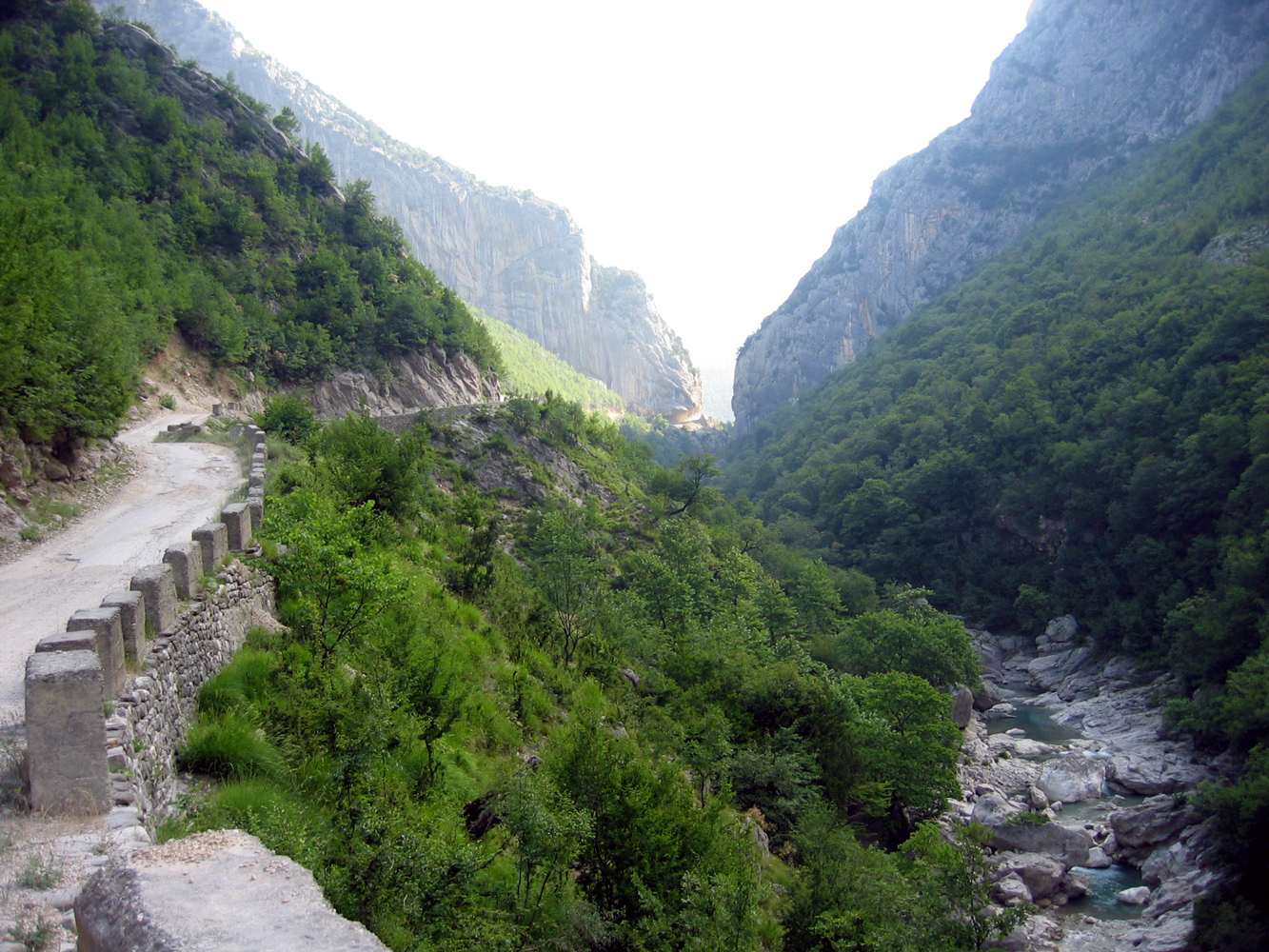
- Ishëm river flowing near Zall Dajt

Location
- Country: Albania

Physical characteristics
- Source
  - location: Kodër-Thumanë, Albania
  - coordinates: 41°30′26″N 19°41′32″E
- Mouth
  - location: Adriatic Sea
  - coordinates: 41°34′40″N 19°33′27″E

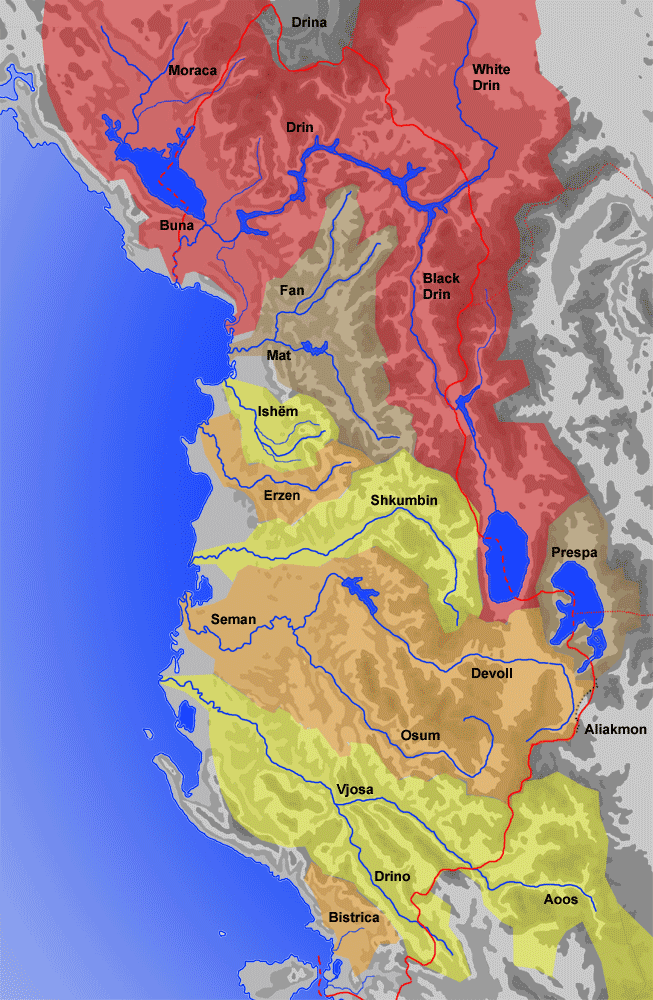
Map with the drainage basins of the Albanian rivers: Ishëm is in the center of the map.

The Ishëm (Albanian definite form: Ishmi; Albanian: Lumi i Ishmit) is a river in western Albania, which brings water to the area north of the Albanian capital, Tirana. It forms part of a watercourse (Tiranë-Gjole-Ishëm), but only the lower third of the watercourse is known as the Ishëm. The Ishëm proper is formed at the confluence of the rivers Gjole and Zezë, a few km northwest of Fushë-Krujë. It flows into the Adriatic Sea near the town of Ishëm. The length of the watercourse is recorded in different sources as between 74 and 79 km.

== Etymology ==
The name of the river was recorded for the first time by Vibius Sequester (4th or 5th century AD) as Isamnus. Albanian Ishëm derives from the ancient name through Albanian phonetic changes, however it has been noted that the accentual pattern found in Íshëm < Ísamnus presupposes an "Adriatic Illyrian" intermediary.

== Tributaries ==
The Ishëm is formed from several rivers which arise to the northeast of Tirana in the Skanderbeg Mountains beyond the Krujë range. The most important of these are:

- The Tiranë (Albanian definite form: Tirana; Albanian: Lumi i Tiranës), which has its source to the northeast of Mount Dajt, is the main tributary of the Ishëm. It crosses the mountain range to the north of Mount Dajt, through a narrow canon called Shkalla Tujanit. It then flows west all the way across the Plain of Tirana. The city of Tirana stretches along the southern edge of its broad flood plain. At the western edge of the plain, the river meets its most important tributary, the Lanë, which rises on the western slopes of Mount Dajt and flows through the city centre of Tirana to the south of the Tiranë river in a westerly direction until it meets it. After this, the river continues in a northerly direction.
- The Tërkuzë (Albanian definite form: Tërkuza; Albanian: Lumi i Tërkuzës) meets the Tiranë a little further north. It also has its source to the east of the mountain chain and crosses it through a canyon, called Shkalle e Bovillës, which has been dammed in order to create the Bovilla Reservoir, which has a surface area of around 8,000,000 m³ and has provided drinking water to the city of Tirana since December 1998. The Tërkuza crosses the Tirana Plain in a northwesterly direction, running past Tirana Airport, before it meets the Tiranë river. Once these two rivers join, the river is referred to as the Gjole.
- The Zezë (Albanian definite form: Zeza; Albanian: Lumi i Zezës, lit. 'Black River') arises east of Krujë. It also runs through a canyon, called Shkalla e Kryemadhës, and then crosses the plain in a northwesterly direction, passing through Fushë-Krujë. It meet the Gjole a few kilometers after the Tërkuza.

== Course ==
From the point where the Zeze joins the Gjole, the river is known as the Ishëm. It flows in a westerly direction until it reaches the edge of the Tirana Plain, then turns to the northwest and heads for the Adriatic. In this part of its journey it passes through a town with the same name. Shortly before the mouth of the river, it is joined by the Droja river, a stream which arises in the mountains northeast of Krujë. The Ishëm discharges into the Adriatic to the southwest of Laç in the Rodon Bay, which is bounded on the western edge by the Cape of Rodon and forms part of the Drin Gulf.

It is possible that the Tiranë river and the Zeza were not always tributaries of the Ishëm, but used to flow into the Erzen. It has been suggested that at an earlier time they crossed the Plain of Tirana in a southwesterly direction, breaking through the chain of hills at the western edge of the plain where there are now two valleys (at Vorë and at Yzberisht), and entering the Erzen river valley. The rivers would have adopted their current, northerly course, as a result of subsidence in the Plain of Tirana.

The drainage basin of the Ishëm covers a total area of 673 km^{2}. The average discharge at the mouth of the river is 20.9 m³/s. The highest annual discharge is over six times the annual minimum.

The city of Bendensis, later called Stephaniaka, was located at the mouth of the Ishëm. It was the seat of the diocese of Benda.

== Pollution ==
The Ishëm and its tributaries, the Lanë and the Tiranë, are seriously polluted. Wastewater from industry and the city of Tirana empties into the rivers without being processed. The quantities of ammonia, nitrogen dioxide, and suspended solids exceed EU legal limits on several different measures. At its mouth, the river smells very bad and the bay is polluted by the wastewater, plastic, and other detritus from Tirana, which threatens an important sea turtle breeding ground.

== Bibliography ==
- Demiraj, Shaban (2006). The origin of the Albanians: linguistically investigated. Tirana: Academy of Sciences of Albania. ISBN 978-99943-817-1-5.
- Huld, Martin E. (1986). "Accentual Stratification of Ancient Greek Loanwords in Albanian". Zeitschrift für vergleichende Sprachforschung. 99 (2). Vandenhoeck & Ruprecht (GmbH & Co. KG): 245–253. JSTOR 40848841.
- Ismajli, Rexhep (2015). Eqrem Basha (ed.). Studime për historinë e shqipes në kontekst ballkanik [Studies on the History of Albanian in the Balkan context] (PDF) (in Albanian). Prishtinë: Kosova Academy of Sciences and Arts, special editions CLII, Section of Linguistics and Literature.
- Katičić, Radoslav (1976). Ancient Languages of the Balkans. Mouton. ISBN 978-9027933058.
- Matzinger, Joachim (2009). "Shqiptarët si pasardhës të ilirëve nga këndvështrimi i gjuhësisë historike". In Schmitt, Oliver Jens; Frantz, Eva Anne (eds.). Historia e Shqiptarëve: Gjendja dhe perspektivat e studimeve (in Albanian). Translated by Pandeli Pani and Artan Puto. Botime Përpjekja. pp. 13–39. ISBN 978-99943-0-254-3.
