= Pëllumbas, Berat =

Pëllumbas
- Village
- Location within Albania
- Coordinates: 40°49′N 20°1′E
- Country: Albania
- County: Berat
- Municipality: Kuçovë
- Administrative unit: Lumas
- Time zone: UTC+1 (CET)
  - Summer (DST): UTC+2 (CEST)

Pëllumbas is a village in the former municipality of Lumas in Berat County, Albania. At the 2015 local government reform it became part of the municipality Kuçovë.
