= Dajti =

Mountain in Albania

- Mali i Dajtit
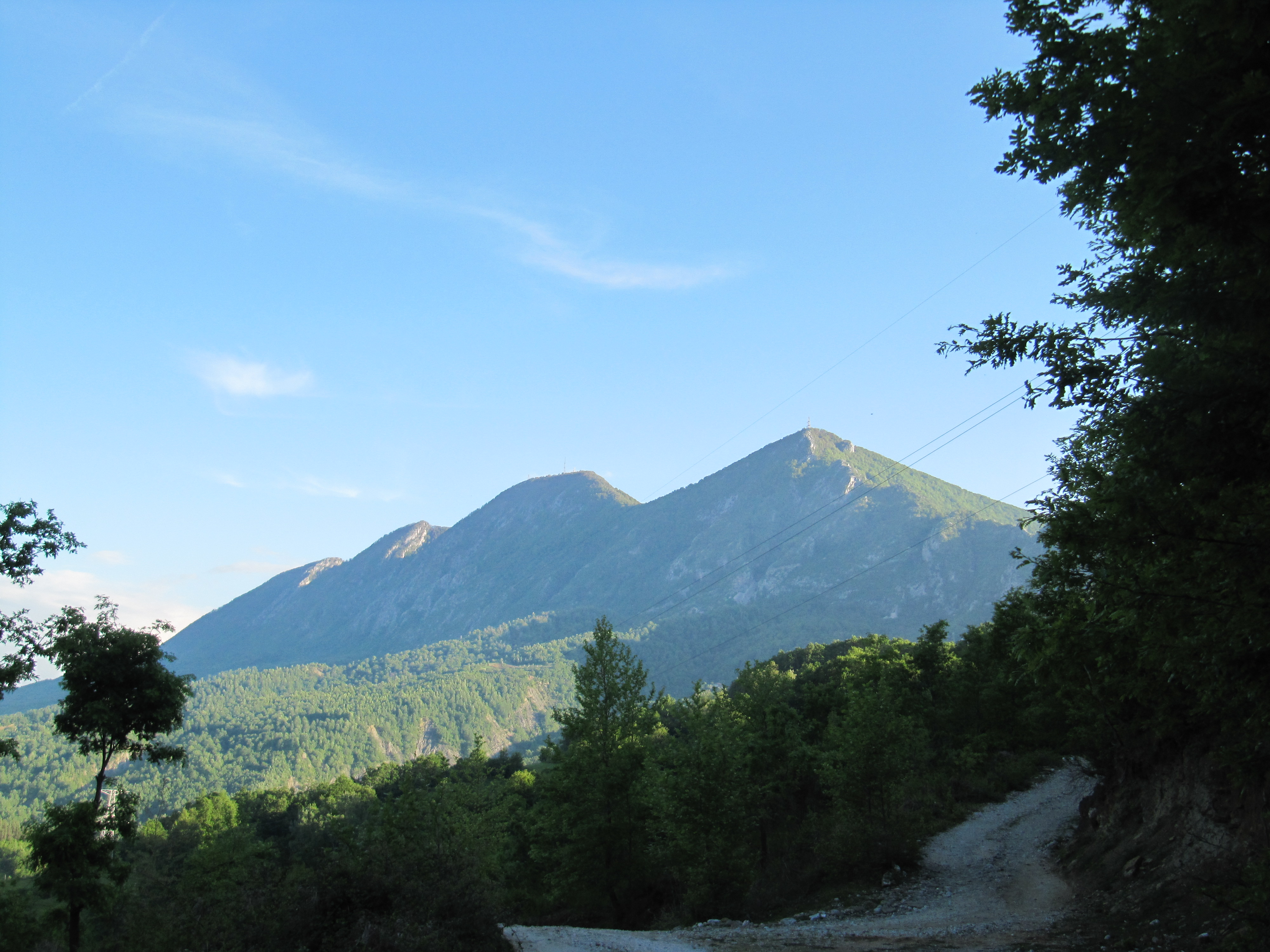
- Dajti mountain seen from the east

Highest point
- Elevation: 1,613 m (5,292 ft)
- Prominence: 939 m (3,081 ft)
- Isolation: 36 m (118 ft)
- Coordinates: 41°22′00″N 19°55′25″E

Naming
- Etymology: Diktynna

Geography
- Location within Albania
- Country: Albania
- Region: Central Mountain Region
- Municipality: Tirana
- Parent range: Skanderbeg Mountains

Geology
- Rock age(s): Cretaceous, Paleogene, Miocene
- Mountain type: massif
- Rock type(s): limestone, flysch

Dajti is a mountain located in central Albania, just east of the capital, Tirana. Part of the Skanderbeg Mountains range, it stretches from Shkalla e Tujanit in the northwest to Qafa e Priskës in the southeast, at a length of 8 km (5.0 mi) and a width of 5 km (3.1 mi).

Its highest peak, Maja e Dajtit, reaches a height of 1,613 m (5,292 ft). Other peaks include Maja e Cem Rrumit 1,571 m (5,154 ft) and Maja e Tujanit 1,531 m (5,023 ft).

== Geology ==
Composed primarily of Cretaceous and Paleogene limestone, with notable karst formations, its upper section is barren of vegetation while the lower section, up to 600 m (2,000 ft), consists of flysch. The undulating mountain ridge features a steep eastern slope and a western slope that gradually descends onto the plain of Tirana, highlighted by an ancient marine terrace known as Fusha e Dajtit, formed during the Miocene era.

== Climate ==
Dajti experiences a cool mountain climate with temperatures averaging 12 °C (54 °F) at heights of about 1,000 m (3,300 ft). Temperatures are the coldest during the month of January (3.2 °C (38 °F)) and the hottest during July (20.4 °C (69 °F)). The average amount of precipitation is 1,520 mm (60 in), a good amount of which is accumulated snow.

== Biodiversity ==
The western slope of the mountain consists of three distinct vegetation belts. The lower belt, up to 600 m (2,000 ft), is covered by Mediterranean shrubs like strawberry tree, juniper and heather; the middle belt, ascending from 600 to 1000 meters, is dominated by an oak forest; the upper belt, above 1400 meters, is covered by a mixture of beech and conifer trees. The peak of the mountain is devoid of vegetation and serves as the base for RTSH's central antenna.

On the eastern slope, the vegetation changes, with a smaller Mediterranean shrub area and the presence of oaks, chestnuts and other trees which are absent on the western slope.

The section of the mountain and its surrounding habitat are designated as a national park.

== See also ==
- List of mountains in Albania
- Dajti Mountain National Park
- Dajti Castle
