= Kavajë District =

Defunct (2000) Albanian administrative area

Kavajë District Rrethi i Kavajës
- Former district
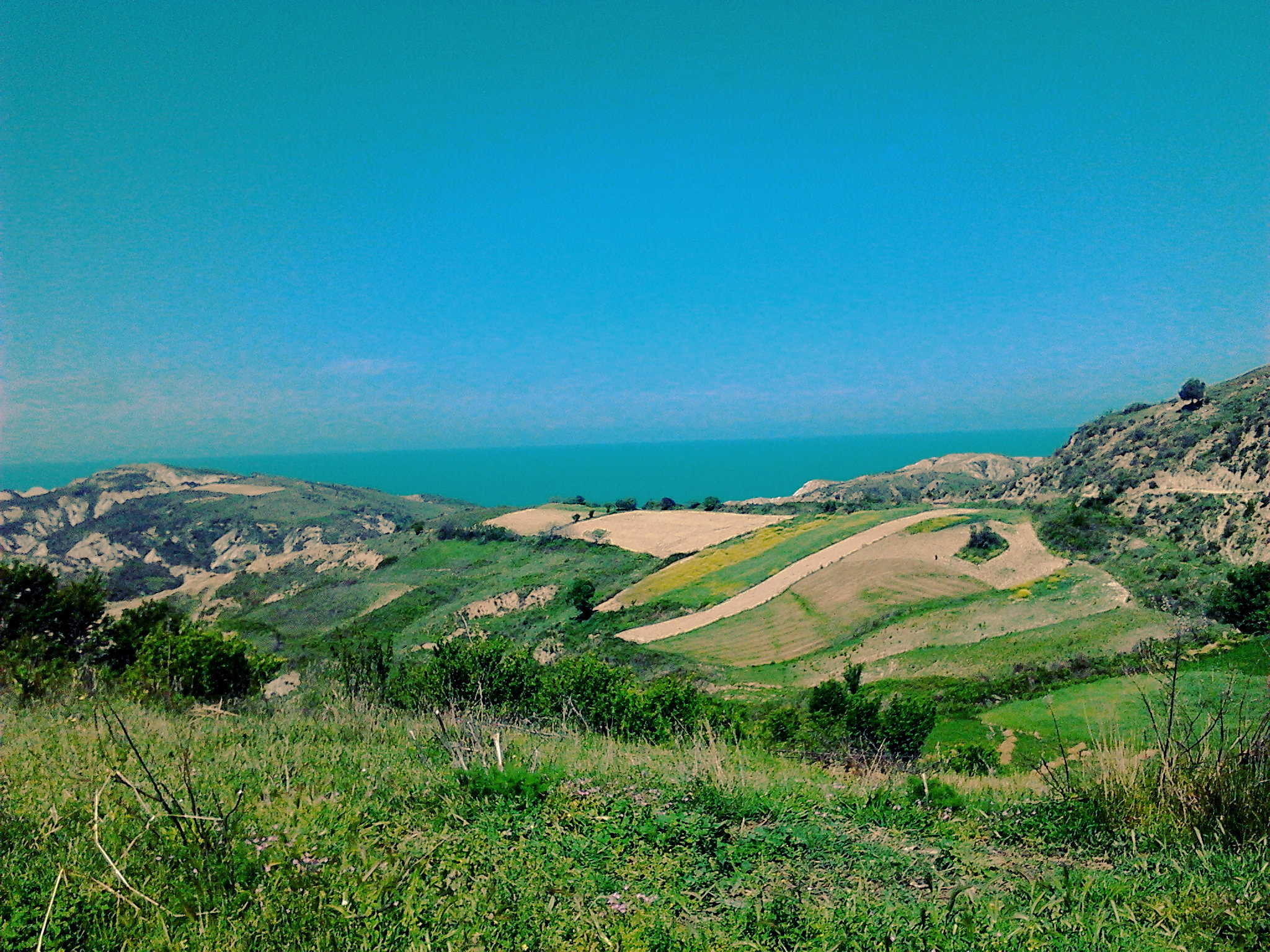
- Overlooking the hills in Bago

- Coordinates: 41°8′N 19°36′E
- Country: Albania
- Incorporated: 1948, 1953, 1991
- Dissolved: 1958, 2000

Area
  - Total: 401 km^{2} (155 sq mi)

Population (2001)
  - Total: 78,179
  - Density: 195/km^{2} (505/sq mi)
- Time zone: UTC+1 (CET)
  - Summer (DST): UTC+2 (CEST)

The District of Kavajë (Albanian: Rrethi i Kavajës) was one of the 36 districts of Albania, which were dissolved in July 2000 and replaced by 12 counties. Centrally located in the Western Lowlands region of Albania, it covered an area of 401 km^{2} (155 sq mi). In consisted of 2 municipalities and 8 communes, with the communes containing a total of 64 villages. Its population at the 2001 census was 78,179 inhabitants.

== Administrative divisions ==
The district consisted of the following municipalities:

=== Kavajë ===
- Golem
- Helmas
- Kavajë
- Luz i Vogël
- Synej

=== Rrogozhinë ===
- Gosë
- Kryevidh
- Lekaj
- Rrogozhinë
- Sinaballaj
