= Mengaj =

- Settlement
- Location within Albania
- Coordinates: 41°11′45″N 19°38′35″E
- Country: Albania
- County: Tirana
- Municipality: Kavajë
- Administrative unit: Helmas
- Time zone: UTC+1 (CET)
  - Summer (DST): UTC+2 (CEST)

Mengaj is a village situated in the central plains of Albania's Western Lowlands region. It is part of Kavajë municipality and Tirana County.
