= Çetë, Kavajë =

Çetë
- Village
- Location within Albania
- Coordinates: 41°11′1″N 19°34′23″E
- Country: Albania
- County: Tirana
- Municipality: Kavajë
- Administrative unit: Helmas
- Time zone: UTC+1 (CET)
  - Summer (DST): UTC+2 (CEST)
- Postal Code: 2507
- Area Code: (0)55

Çetë (Albanian definite form: Çeta) is a village in Tirana County, Albania. At the 2015 local government reform it became part of the municipality Kavajë. It borders Golem to the north, Kavajë to the west and Momël to the south. It is known for the 13th century St. Paraskevi's Church that attracts tourists and church goers from all over the country.
