= Shtodhër =

- Village
- Location within Albania
- Coordinates: 41°9′55″N 19°35′3″E
- Country: Albania
- County: Tirana
- Municipality: Kavajë
- Administrative unit: Helmas
- Time zone: UTC+1 (CET)
  - Summer (DST): UTC+2 (CEST)
- Postal Code: 2507
- Area Code: (0)55

Shtodhër is a village situated in the central plains of Albania's Western Lowlands region. It is part of Tirana County. At the 2015 local government reform it became part of the municipality Kavajë.
