= Kryezi, Kavajë =

Kryezi
- Village
- Location within Albania
- Coordinates: 41°13′21″N 19°37′38″E
- Country: Albania
- County: Tirana
- Municipality: Kavajë
- Administrative unit: Helmas
- Elevation: 350 m (1,150 ft)
- Time zone: UTC+1 (CET)
  - Summer (DST): UTC+2 (CEST)
- Postal Code: 2507
- Area Code: (0)55

Kryezi is a village situated in the central plains of Albania's Western Lowlands region. It is part of Tirana County. At the 2015 local government reform it became part of the municipality Kavajë. There is one school the Kisha Shen Mehilli.
