= Xhafa =

Xhafa or Xhafaj may refer to:

- XHAFA-FM, a radio station in Veracruz, Mexico
- Xhafa (surname)
- Zik-Xhafaj, a locality in Albania
