= Bago =

Bago may refer to:

== Places ==
=== Myanmar ===
- Bago, Myanmar, a city and the capital of the Bago Region
- Bago District, a district of the Bago Region
- Bago Region, an administrative region
- Bago River, a river
- Bago Yoma or Pegu Range, a mountain range

=== Philippines ===
- Bago, Negros Occidental, a city
- Bago, a barangay (administrative division) in the municipality Asturias, Cebu
- Bago, a barangay (administrative division) in the municipality Bato, Leyte
- Bago, a supreme deity of the Isnag people; Bago is the spirit of the forest

=== Other places ===
- Bago, Albania, a village in Tirana County, Albania
- Bågø, an island of Denmark

== People ==
- Datu Bago (1770–1850), Philippine ruler
- Đuro Bago (born 1961), Croatian football manager
- Mislav Bago (1973-2022), Croatian journalist
- Mohammed Umar Bago (born 1974), Nigerian politician
- Umaru Bago Tafida (born 1954), Nigerian traditional ruler
- Zoltán Bagó (born 1975), Hungarian politician
- José Riquelme y López-Bago (1880–1972), Spanish soldier

== Other uses ==
- Bago (horse), a thoroughbred race horse
- Bago language, a Gur language of Togo
- Bago Palace, in Bago, Myanmar
- Mount Bago, a mountain in California
