= Kavajë =

- Municipality
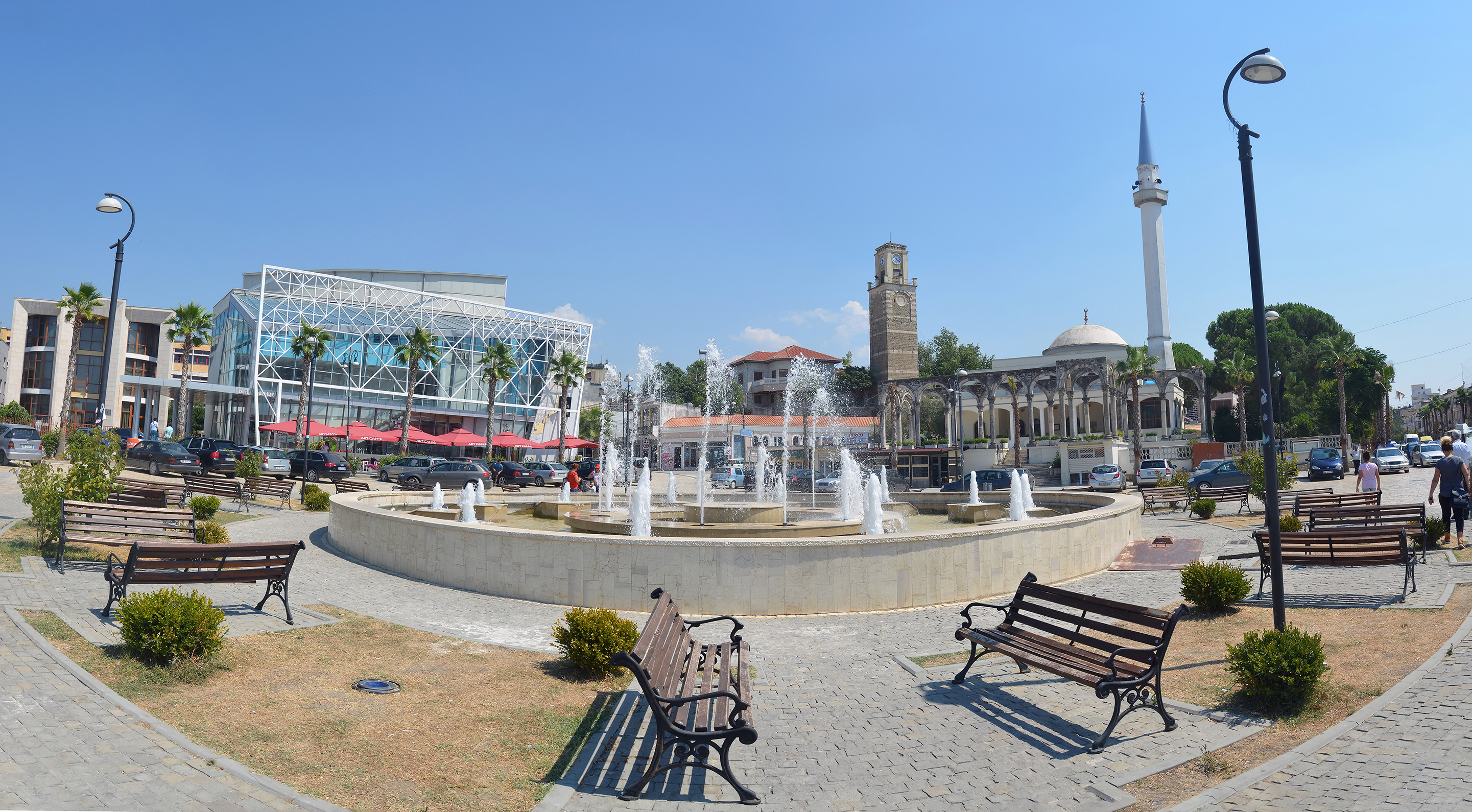
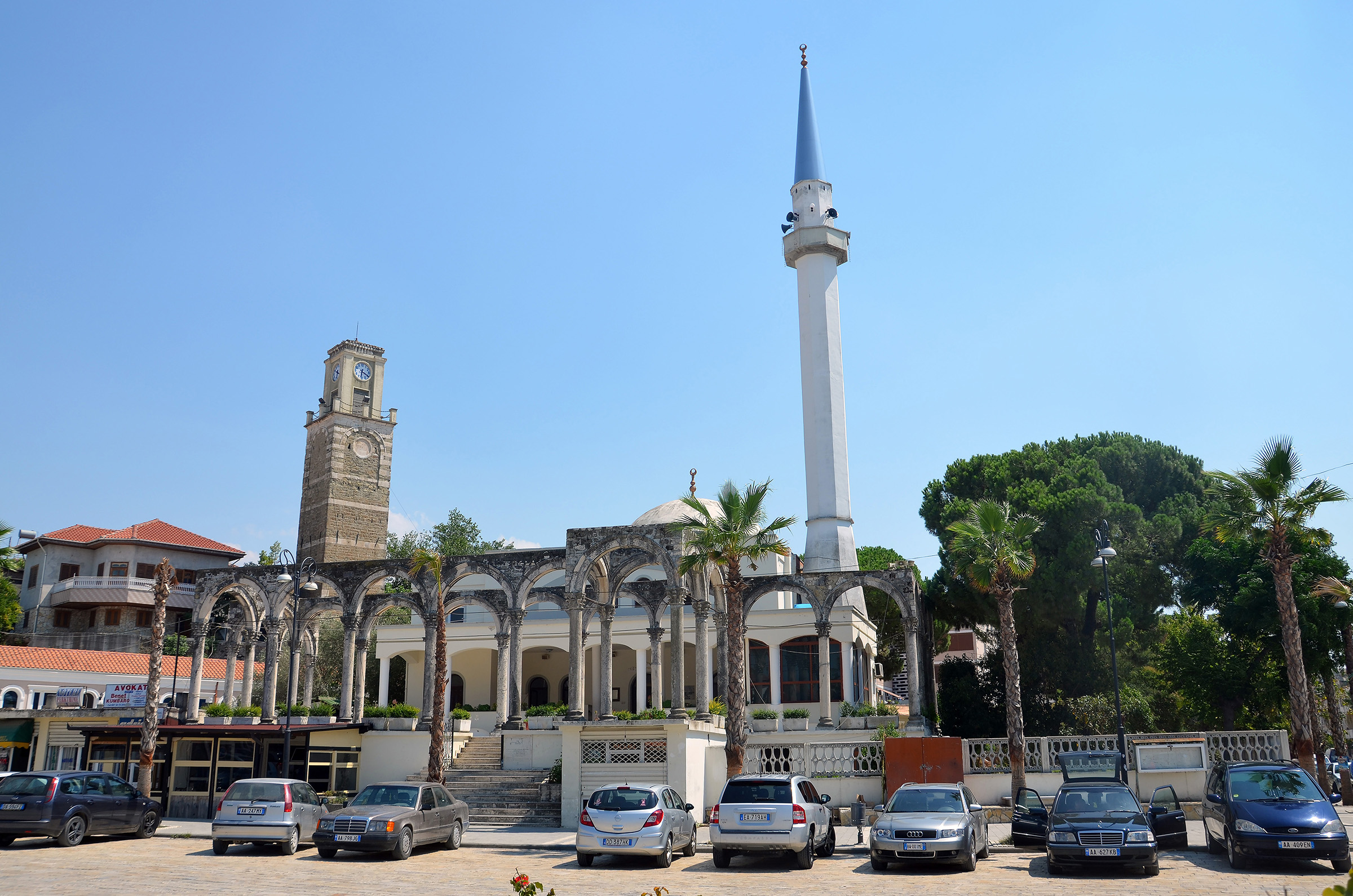
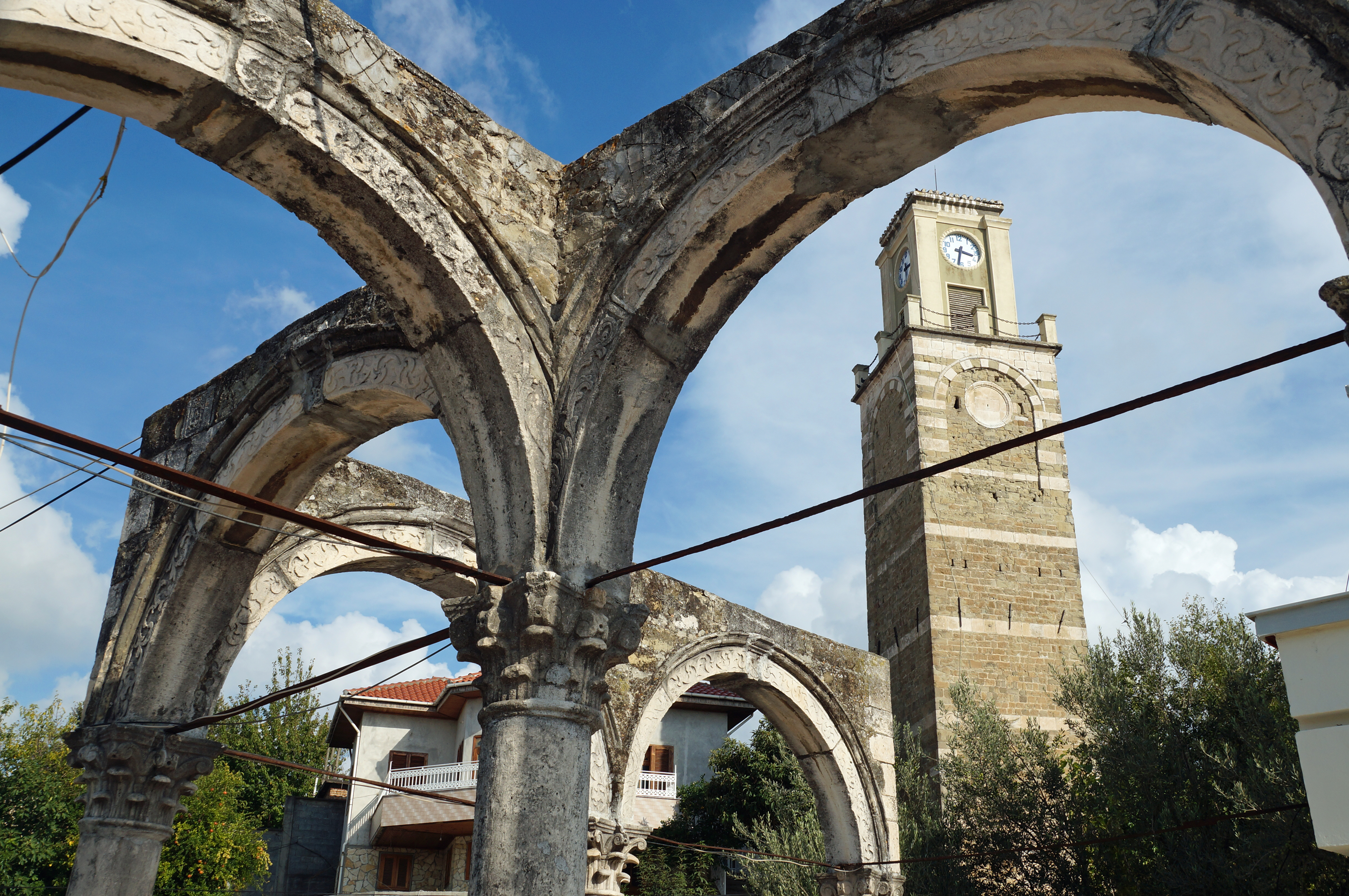
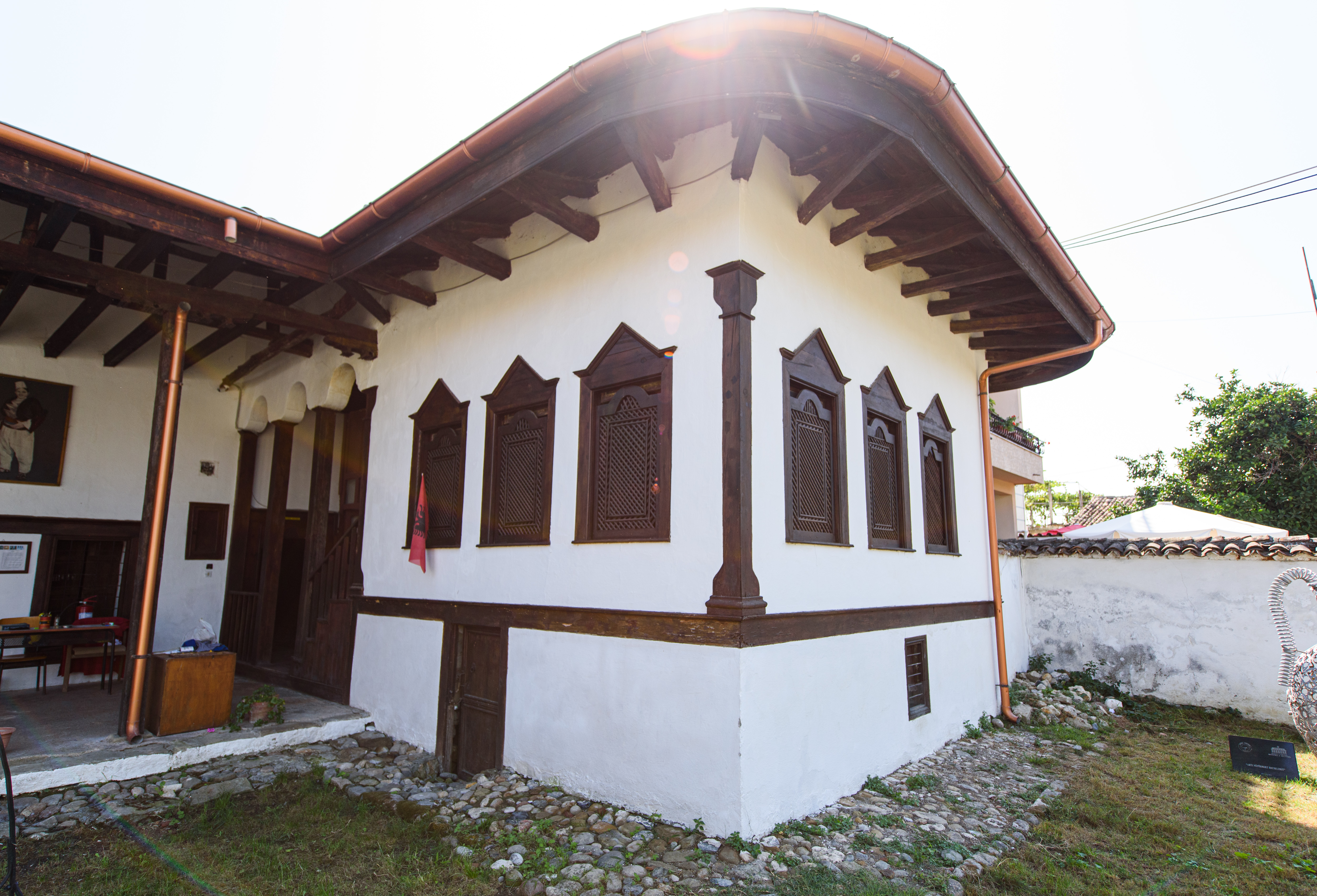
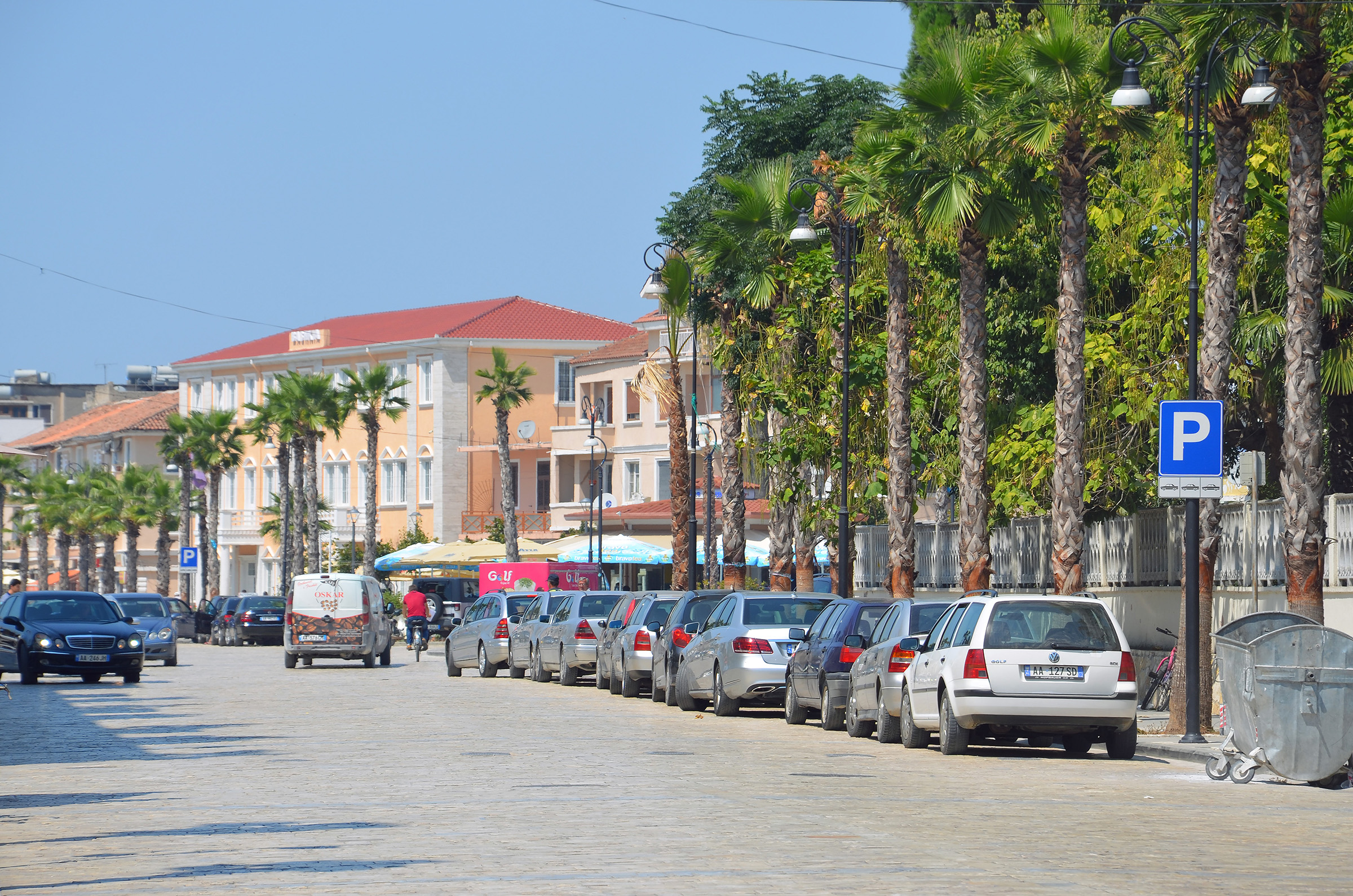
- From the top, City Centre, Kubelie Mosque, Clock Tower, Ethnographic Museum, Main Boulevard

- Flag Emblem

- Location within Albania
- Coordinates: 41°11′03″N 19°33′43″E
- Country: Albania
- County: Tirana
- Settled: 1595
- Incorporated: 1867

Government
  - Mayor: Fisnik Qosja (PD)

Area
  - Rank: 48th
  - Municipality: 199.00 km^{2} (76.83 sq mi)
  - Administrative unit: 7.05 km^{2} (2.72 sq mi)
- Elevation: 24 m (79 ft)

Population (2023)
  - Rank: 18th
  - Municipality: 30,012
  - Municipality density: 150.81/km^{2} (390.61/sq mi)
  - Administrative unit: 15,827
  - Administrative unit density: 2,240/km^{2} (5,810/sq mi)
- Demonym(s): Albanian: Kavajas (m), Kavajase (f) or Kavajs (m), Kavajse (f)
- Time zone: UTC+1 (CET)
  - Summer (DST): UTC+2 (CEST)
- Postal Code: 2501–2502
- Area Code: (0)55
- Website: bashkiakavaje.gov.al

Kavajë (/kɑːˈvaɪə/ kah-VY-ə, Albanian definite form: Kavaja) is a city and municipality centrally located in the Western Lowlands region of Albania, in Tirana County. It borders Durrës to the north 17 km (11 mi), Tiranë to the east 27 km (17 mi) and Rrogozhinë to the south 15 km (9 mi). To the west lies the Adriatic Sea. According on the 2023 census, the municipality had a population of 30,012, although the Civil Registry inferred the total number of inhabitants to be 79,556. The overall surface area is 199.00 square kilometres (76.83 sq mi).

== Etymology ==
The name Kavajë is mentioned in Ottoman archives from the Land Registry of the Sanjak of Albania for the years 1431–1432. In the documents, first published by Turkish researcher Halil İnalcık this locality was part of. On Latin Maps it was mentioned as Cavalli.

== History ==
=== Early development ===
There have been varied opinions on the origin of Kavajë as an inhabited settlement. Until recently, researchers believed the early beginnings of this region as a settlement should be sought somewhere in the middle of the 16th century. However, relying on the findings of geological fragments and inscriptions, it appears that the origin of this settlement can be traced back to the first centuries BCE.

The present day territory of Kavajë has been inhabited since the Late Antiquity. It is believed that the Illyrian tribe of Taulantii built their city Arnisa in the area today known as Zik-Xhafaj. Ensuing the Roman Conquest of the region, Kavajë would establish itself as a transit route for Via Egnatia – the road was built by the Romans in order to link a chain of their colonies stretching from the Adriatic Sea to the Bosphorus. The famous Battle of Pharsalus between Julius Caesar and his archrival Pompey took place near Shkëmbi i Kavajës, at the time known as Petra. Byzantine historian Anna Komnena in the Alexiad records the name of the area as Kabalion.

In the second half of the 13th century and up until the early 15th century, much of central Albania and its surrounding region were ruled by a few powerful feudal families. The two most prominent families that ruled Kavajë at this time were the feudal families of Skuraj and Matrangaj. The Skuraj family, as direct descendants of the dynasty that founded the Principality of Arbanon controlled the eastern part of Kavajë. Their emblem depicted a lion standing up on one foot and reaching up to grab a fleur-de-lis. This symbol would later be used as the official Emblem of the City of Tirana. The Zguraj neighborhood of Kavajë (Lagja Zguraj) is named after the Skuraj Dynasty that ruled the region.
The Matrangaj family as the most powerful rulers of the region had established their center in Bashtovë. They controlled most of the Myzeqe plains and the coastal hills of Karpen.

=== Ottoman Period ===
Ottoman writer and traveler Evliya Çelebi describes Kavajë in this 1670 memoir:

"From here, we set off eastwards down the coastal plain of the bay, viewing well-developed, verdant villages to the left and right of the road and prosperous towered farm-estates, and in hours we reached the well-protected and mighty town of Kavaja. It was founded in the year .... by ..... Kavaja, at the border of Elbasan, is ruled by an independent voyvoda under the jurisdiction of the Emin of Durrës. Since the fortress of Durrës is located in an isolated and unproductive place on the coast, the qadi of Durrës resides here, whereas the Emin still lives in Durrës. The qadi has a salary level of 150 akçe and has authority over 73 villages. Kavaja is a charming town on a broad, flat and fertile plain at the end of the bay projecting from the gulf, and is surrounded by gardens and vineyards. It has 400 one- and two-storey terraced stonework houses with tiled roofs and embellished with delightful gardens, ponds and fountains. There are also exquisite mansions with towers and pleasure-domes. Many noble families live here, such as the Haris-zade family and the Pasha-zade family.

Kavaja has 4 quarters, including .... and ....; and 4 congregational mosques, including .... in the bazaar, and ..... There are also 4 neighbourhood mosques, all with squat minarets lacking stonework. There are 2 medreses, but the students are not much interested in learning. There are 3 primary schools and 2 dervish tekkes, as well as 200 prosperous and well-kept shops in the bazaar. On both sides of the bazaar street grow mulberry trees which provide the bazaar with shade. All the trades are represented here and one finds all kinds of valuable and invaluable goods. The bazaar is wealthy and bustling, since people from Bashtova and Durrës come here to buy their goods and produce. There are 2 khans for travelling tradesmen, also built of carved stonework, in which all sort of fabrics are to be found, as if they were covered bazaars. There are no baths in the bazaar, but over 40 private baths are to be found in the better homes – or so I have been told. Haris-zade Aga has promised to construct a public bath and has secured a lot for it in the bazaar – may God fulfil his intention. No one until now has undertaken such a project. It was deemed unnecessary because the noble families allowed their relatives and retainers to use their private baths. There are many rich businessmen and generous home owners. Kavaja has a mild climate and so the people are very hospitable."

— Evliya Çelebi

Scottish diplomat David Urquhart describes his encounter upon arriving in Kavajë in this 1831 piece:

The next day, in the afternoon, I arrived at Cavalha [Kavaja], and on entering the place, which contains between two and three hundred Guegue families, I met Ibrahim Bey, the proprietor of this place and the surrounding country, accompanied by a troop of savage and picturesque looking horsemen; but they all fell short of the ferocious air of their leader – a man guilty of every crime, and stained with every vice, and detested alike by Turks and Christians. The blood of his nearest relatives was on his head. He possesses – in the way that an Albanian Odjack possesses – an extent of country thirty miles in every direction.

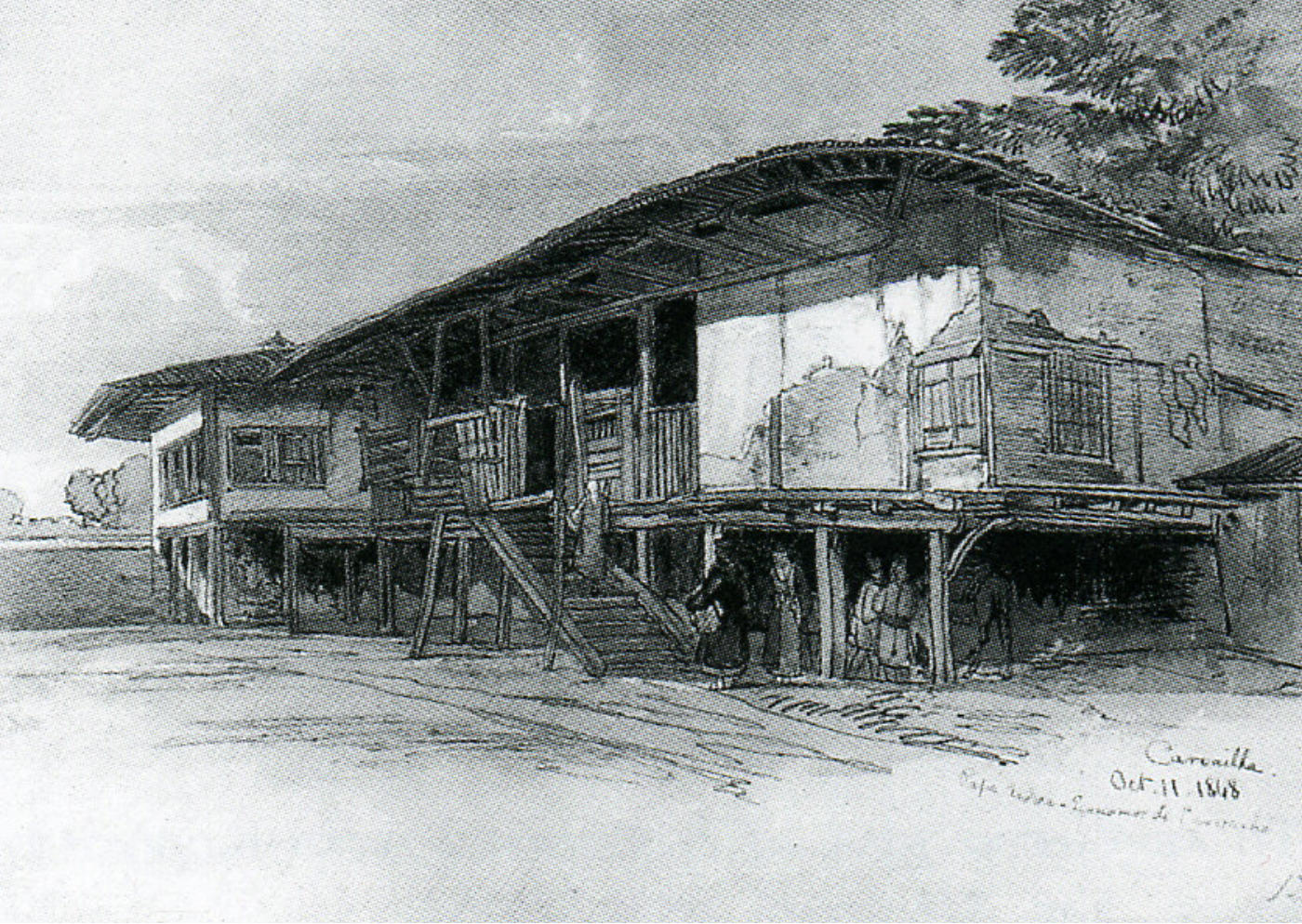
Pencil drawing of a khan in Kavajë – by Edward Lear (October 11, 1848).

I had now fairly entered into the country of the Guegues: they are the northernmost of the three general divisions of Albanians; – the first, to the south, called Châmi, of which Janini [Janina] is the capital; the second, composed of Toxides, the Liapes, and others, extends to Berat; the third, from Berat to the mountains of Monte Negro and Bosnia, are the Guegues. These last, though speaking a dialect of the Skipt, or Albanian, are strongly tinctured with Sclavonian blood; whereas, to the south, the influence of Greece has more prevailed. The Guegues have a distinct costume: they wear the fustanel, or large white kilt; but the short jacket of the southern Albanians is with them prolonged into a skirt – descends as low as the extremity of the fustanel, and is bound under their belt, so as entirely to cover the fustanel behind. The colours they affect are crimson and purple; and these, with their red caps, white fustanels, red leggings, and gold-embroidered vests, gives a richness and splendour to their appearance, especially when assembled in numbers, which exceeds, even in effect, that most elegant of costumes, the southern Albanian. I never saw any thing more beautiful than the groups of children. The paleness of complexion which, even in infancy, casts its invariable shade, here yields to the joint influence of the mountains and the north. The little creatures wear, in miniature, the formal dresses of their sires; and the delicate crimson of their cheeks is matched with that colour which supersedes every other in their costume.

— David Urquhart

=== Modern development ===
Dr. Erickson was a missionary to Albania who had offered political advice to the Vatra delegation at the Paris Peace Conference of 1919. The school he founded, aimed to promote the knowledge of modern scientific agriculture and provide a thorough training to young Albanians.

The girls school was inaugurated on September 20 and the boys agriculture school opened on October 10 of that same year. Cost for enrollment was 50 gold franga per month. The students could study continuously for three straight years with an option for two additional years given to those with excellent results. Classes were taught in both Albanian and English language.

Funding for the project was made possible by the Near East Foundation who had commissioned New York based studio "Thompson & Churchill" in charge of the architectural design. Following the Italian fascist occupation of 1939, the school was briefly renamed Italian Agrarian Institute "Arnaldo Mussolini" in honor of Benito Mussolini's younger brother.

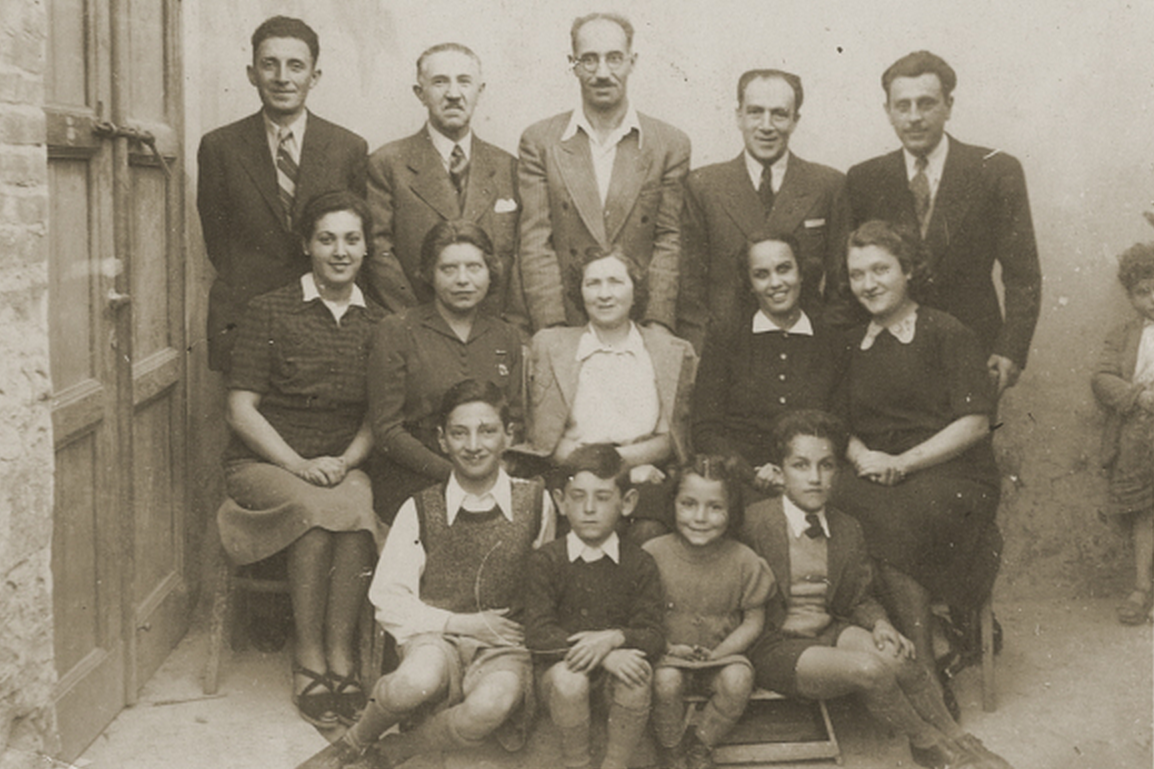
Jewish Families of Mandil, Azriel, Altarac, Ruchvarger and Borger in a group portrait. (Kavajë, 1 May 1942)

At the start of World War II, approximately 600 Jews lived in the Republic of Albania. About 400 of them were German and Austrian refugees and the rest were from nearby countries like Yugoslavia and Greece. The largest number of these refugees, some 200 in total, were placed at a camp in Kavajë where they would later find shelter amongst the local population.

The citizens of Kavajë gave an invaluable contribution in the housing and sheltering of Jewish refugees during the war. The names of Mihal Lekatari, Besim Kadiu and Shyqyri Myrto are placed on the list of the Righteous among the Nations honored by Yad Vashem.

Known primarily as an agricultural region, in the early decade of the 1960s Kavajë started to emerge as an important industrial center in Albania. Following is a list of the major industrial plants that operated in the city:

- The Nails and Bolts Plant (Uzina e Gozhdë-Bulonave) was inaugurated on November 28, 1963. Using Chinese technology, the plant produced nails, bolts and screws. In the later years, with its expansion, the plant started to produce wooden screws, metal wires, metal chains, rail bolts, barbed wires, etc. As of 1990 the plant employed 1,200 workers.
- The Paper Factory (Fabrika e Letrës) was inaugurated on November 28, 1966. Using Chinese technology, it initially started to produce stationery paper for notebooks, books and textbooks as well as typographic paper for official documents and newspapers. This plant employed 750 workers at its peak.

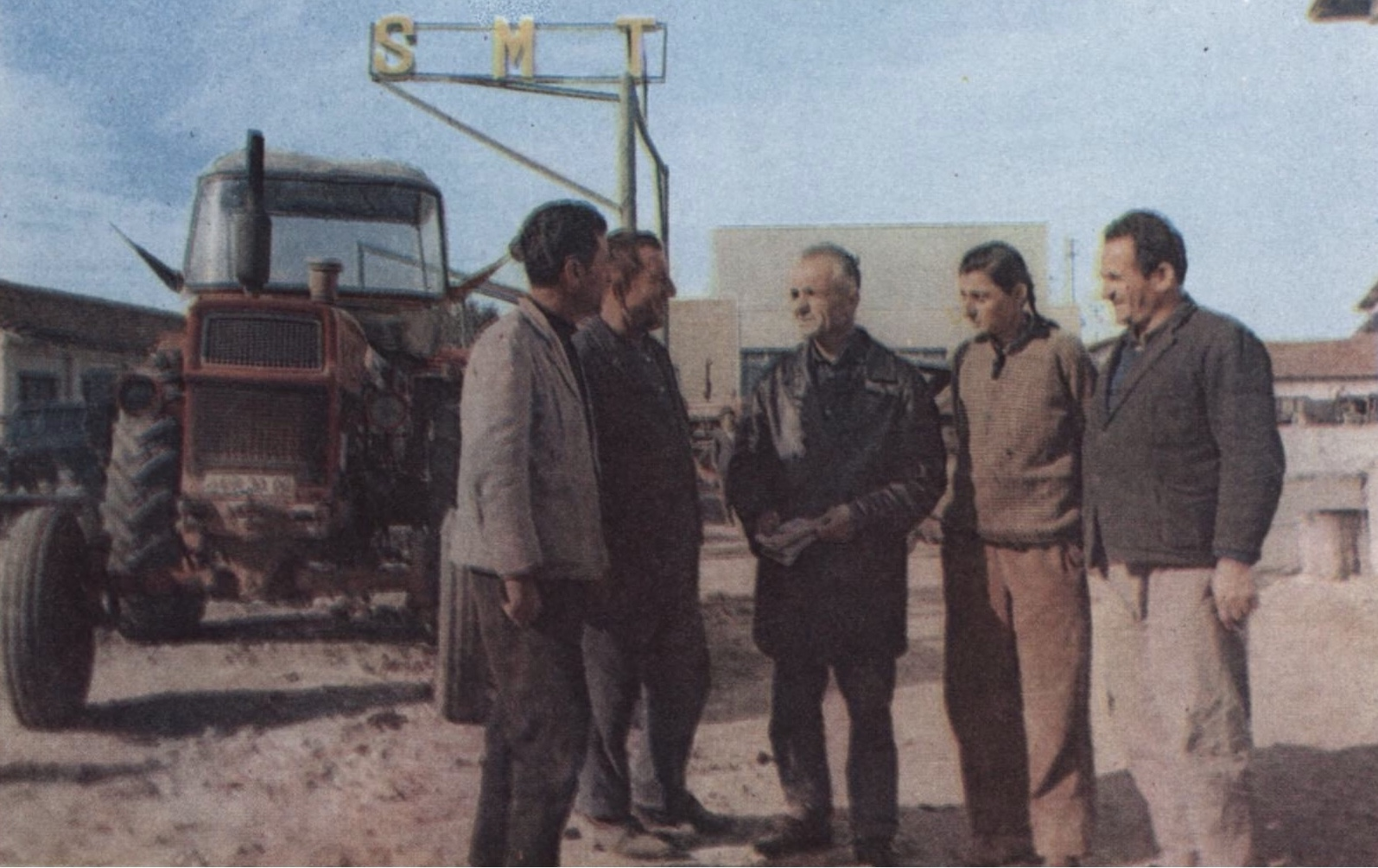
SMT – Machine and Tractors Station

- The Glass Factory (Fabrika e Qelqit) was inaugurated in the late fall of 1970. Like the others, this factory also used Chinese technology. It produced glass packaging and other glass items for mass consumption. Later on, a ceramic production facility was opened. In 1975, new mirror production lines were set and attempts to produce seasoned glass gave little results. After 1985 the factory started producing items like pearls, stone rings, etc. The Glass factory along with the ceramic facility employed 2,500 workers.
- The Carpet Production Plant (Ndërmarrja e Prodhimit të Qilimave) had a separate department for the production of artistic copper. It produced mainly tapestry carpets and artistic copper items for the domestic market. This plant employed 3,000 workers.
- The Food Factory (Fabrika Ushqimore) processed fresh fruits, vegetables and bread for the local population. It also produced conserved fruits and vegetables for exports. This factory employed 300 workers.

=== Communism ===
The first anti-communist revolt in Kavajë took place in the Summer of 1988. It was a union strike organized by Nazmi Roli, Fatmir Veliu, Skënder Germani, Viktor Rrapi and others who were protesting against job cuts and poor working conditions on behalf of the pottery workers and those who worked at the textile plant and the glass factory. In the succeeding months, the city's youth which at the time was forced by the regime to work in agriculture cooperatives, started distributing anti-communist leaflets at local shops, schools and villages nearby. Enver Hoxha's portrait was torn apart at the city's main high school and at the SMT (Cars and Tractors Station). The perpetrators were Qazim Kariqi, Josif Budo, Mihal Budo, Rexhep Rrugeja, Shpetim Nova, Alket Alushi, Xhevat Hylviu, Artan Lajthia, Adem Hylviu, Arben Goga, Artan Çelhyka, Tahir Okshtuni, Skënder Llixha etc. These were powerful blows that brought embarrassment to the leadership of the party and the state security apparatus. On March 26, 1990, the first active demonstration in Albania took place in the streets of Kavajë. The event that triggered these demonstrations was the football match between local club Besa and Tirana club Partizani which had long been favored by the regime. Angry fans threw banners on the field detesting the system. After the match, numerous people were arrested by the police. Outraged citizens took on the streets and burned the city's police building thus marking the first event of importance against the regime at the time.

== Geography ==
Kavajë is a municipality built on the coastal plains of Albania's Western Lowlands region. Located just south of the Bay of Durrës, it is partially engulfed by two small river streams, Leshniqe to the west-northwest and Darçi to the west-southwest. The municipality borders Durrës to the north at latitude 41°15'N with Përroi i Agait, which flows into the sea, being the dividing border line. The eastern hills near Kryezi border Tirana at longitude 19°38'E. To the south, Rrogozhinë is bordered at the intersecting point between Luz i Vogël and Luz i Madh at latitude 41°07'N. The Adriatic Sea faces the western side, with Kepi i Lagjit being its most extreme point at longitude 19°27'E. Within these boundaries the municipality has an approximate surface area of 198.81 km^{2}.

The highest elevation point is the peak of Bezmajet which reaches a height of 391.97 m (1,286 ft). The lowest depression point is found near the shores of Karpen at −10 m (−33 ft) below sea level.

=== Administrative divisions ===
The municipality of Kavajë consists of the following subdivisions:

- Agonas
- Bago
- Beden
- Blerimaj
- Bukaq
- Cikallesh
- Çetë
- Çollakaj
- Golem
- Golemas
- Habilaj
- Hajdaraj
- Helmas
- Kanaparaj
- Karpen
- Karpen i Ri
- Kryemëdhej
- Kryezi
- Lis-Patros
- Luz i Vogël
- Momël
- Peqinaj
- Qerret
- Rrakull
- Rrikaj
- Seferaj
- Synej
- Shtodhër
- Tilaj
- Vorrozen
- Zikularaj
- Zik-Xhafaj

Map of Kavajë Municipality as defined by the Territorial Administrative Reform of 2014. Source: ASIG

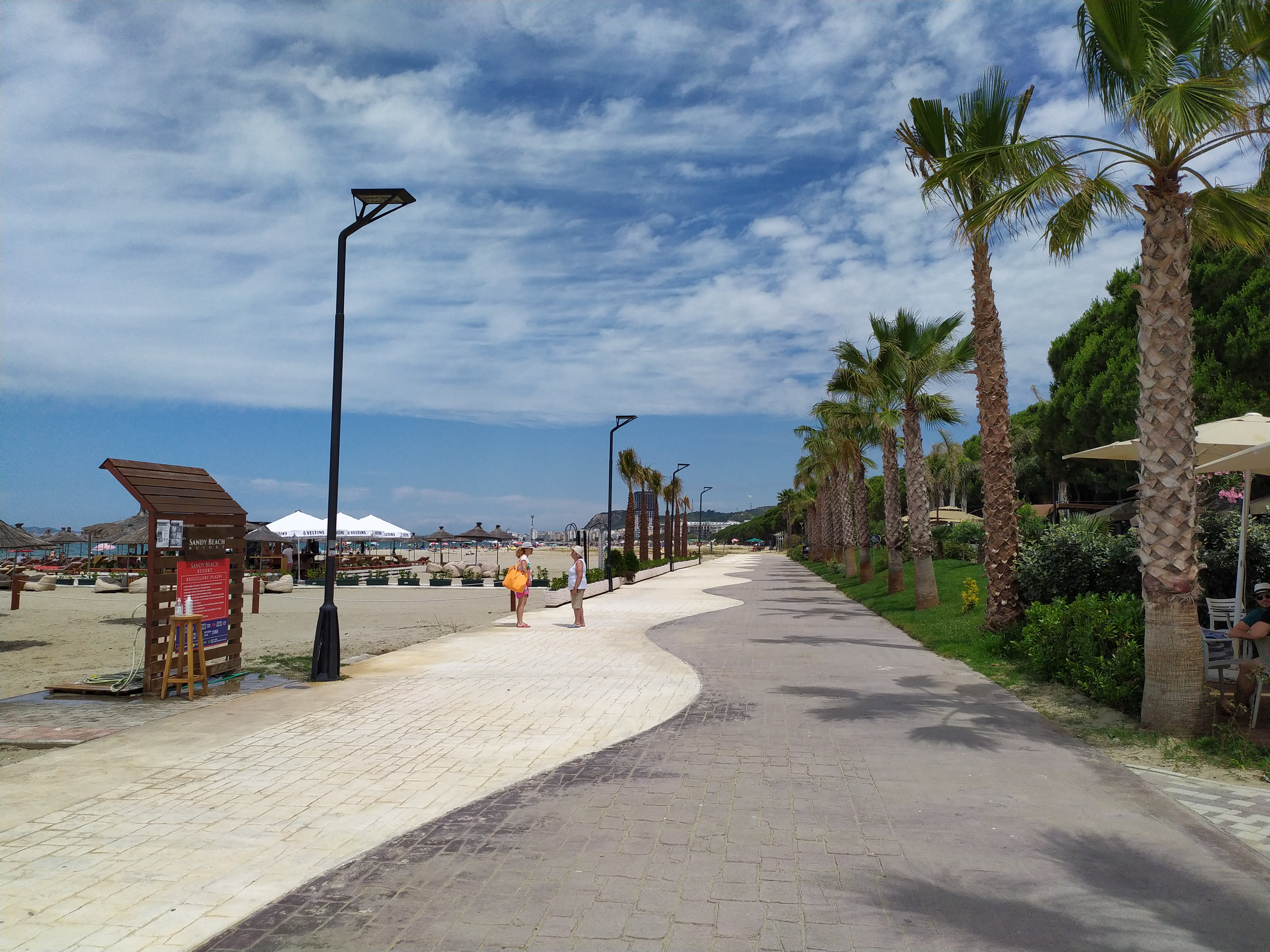
Golem beach promenade

Kavajë's coastline measures roughly at a length of 29.61 km (18 mi) and is mostly flat with plenty of sandy and gravel beaches. The main beaches are: Golem (Mali i Robit, Qerret), Karpen (Kepi i Bishtit të Barbaut), Carina (Gjiri i Forsilukut), Kepi i Lagjit (Kalaja e Turrës), Plazhi i Gjeneralit, Spille (Guri i Lëmuar), Greth.

=== Climate ===
Kavajë weather data for 2017

Climate chart (precipitation, max. and min. temperature)
J	F	M	A	M	J	J	A	S	O	N	D
88 11 −2	98 16 3	83 20 5	71 21 7	68 25 12	2 32 17	7 34 18	17 36 18	83 28 14	43 24 8	253 18 5	259 13 2
- █ Average max. and min. temperatures in °C
- █ Precipitation totals in mm
- Source: AccuWeather
Imperial conversion
J	F	M	A	M	J	J	A	S	O	N	D
3.5 52 28	3.9 61 37	3.3 68 41	2.8 70 45	2.7 77 54	0.1 90 63	0.3 93 64	0.7 97 64	3.3 82 57	1.7 75 46	10 64 41	10 55 36
- █ Average max. and min. temperatures in °F
- █ Precipitation totals in inches

Kavajë is located in a Mediterranean Climate region where the summers are dry and hot and the winters are wet and mild. Average surface temperatures range annually between 15.5 to 16 °C (59.9 to 60.8 °F).

The following objects/places are declared natural monuments in this region by decree nr.767 dated 20 December 2002: Salt Springs of Golemas, Sulfurous Springs of Fliballie, Laurel of Turrë Castle, Coastal Cliffs of Bardhor, Carina Beach, Sea Fossils of Thartor, Aligned Rocks in Cikallesh, General's Beach, Karstic Caves in Mengaj

== Demographics ==
This detailed high resolution vector map of the city streets in 2014 was created using satellite imagery data from Google Earth.

Historical population
Year	Pop.	±%
1913	5,500	—
1927	6,300	+14.5%
1938	7,300	+15.9%
1945	9,650	+32.2%
1950	9,191	−4.8%
1960	14,189	+54.4%
1969	17,600	+24.0%
1979	20,900	+18.8%
1989	25,156	+20.4%
2001	24,776	−1.5%
2011	20,192	−18.5%
2023	15,827	−21.6%
Source: Urbanistika dhe Arkitektura e Qytetit të Kavajës (I.Sukaj – 1998),

Population density in urban areas was 285 inhabitants per km^{2} and in rural areas much less. 57.6% of the people in the district lived in rural areas whereas 42.4% lived in the city. The gender structure of the population is almost equal. Only 48% of the workforce is employed. Since 1990, more than 25% of the total population in the district has migrated elsewhere, mainly to countries such as Italy, Greece, Great Britain, France, Germany, United States and Canada. A smaller percentage has migrated towards neighbouring Durrës and the capital, Tirana.

As of 2023, Kavajë’s population stood at 30,012. The population is distributed as follows:

- 0–14 years: 4,338
- 15–64 years: 18,400
- 65+ years: 7,274

The gender distribution as of 2023 was:

- Males: 14,892 (2,246 aged 0-14, 8,951 aged 15-64, 3,695 aged 65+)
- Females: 15,120 (2,092 aged 0-14, 9,449 aged 15-64, 3,579 aged 65+)

== Politics & Urban development ==
=== Political Dynamics ===
Kavajë has long been considered a stronghold of the Democratic Party (PD), largely due to its anti-communist stance and active participation in Albania's post-communist movements. The city is known for its resistance against communist rule and has historically aligned with right-wing parties.

However, this political landscape began to shift in 2013 with the election of Elvis Rroshi, a candidate from the Socialist Party (PS), as mayor. This marked a significant change in the city's political trajectory, as Kavajë, traditionally dominated by PD, elected a left-wing leader. The city's political alignment continued to evolve as both parties competed intensely for local governance. Rroshi's tenure as mayor ended when he resigned following the implementation of Albania's “decriminalization law,” which aims to remove individuals with criminal records from public office. He acknowledged being convicted in Italy and facing criminal charges in Germany before 2002. A 2015 investigation by BIRN revealed that Rroshi had been convicted in Switzerland for drug-related offenses during the 1990s. Despite facing criminal proceedings, Prime Minister Edi Rama defended Rroshi, attributing his legal troubles to the hardships faced by many Albanians seeking to emigrate in the 1990s. Rroshi was praised for his achievements as mayor, despite the controversies surrounding his past. One of the major works under his tenure was the rehabilitation of the city center and the reconstruction of the municipality building.

In May 2023, Fisnik Qosja, from the Democratic Party (PD), was elected mayor of Kavajë. His victory was seen as a significant political shift, with former Prime Minister Sali Berisha commending the citizens of Kavajë for what he termed the “liberation” of the city, referencing the anti-communist movements of the 1990s. The city has seen political competition between the Socialist and Democratic parties. During the 2023 local elections, the Socialist Party, led by Prime Minister Edi Rama, campaigned heavily in the city. The Socialist leadership highlighted their development projects in Kavajë, including rebuilding efforts after the 2019 earthquake.

=== City Planning ===
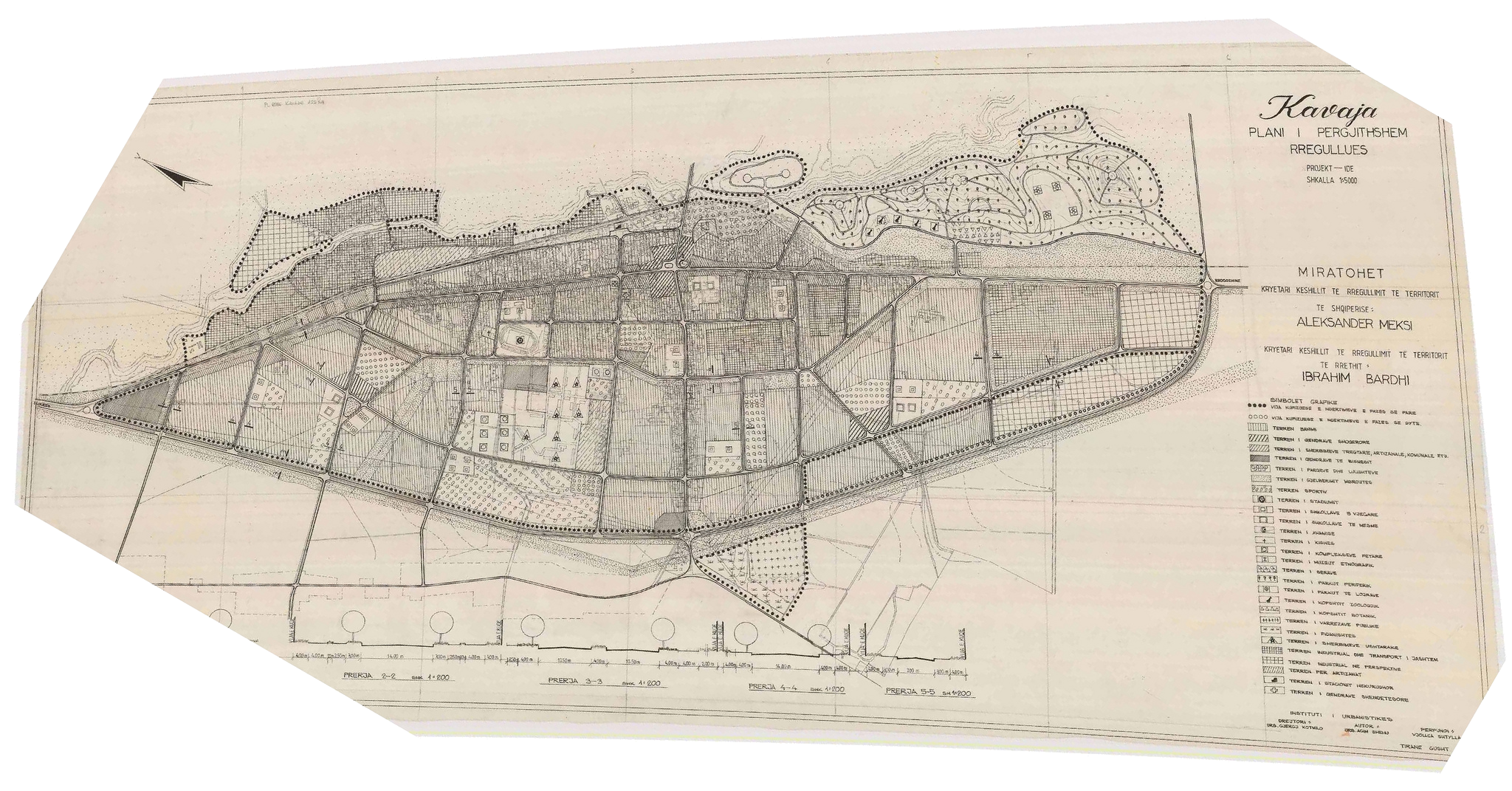
The General Regulatory Masterplan approved by the District Council in 1994.

Kavajë's General Regulatory Masterplan was drafted in 1994 and approved in that same year by the district council. In the masterplan the city extended over an area of 760 ha (1,900 acres) and was spatially divided into several functional zoning schemes. The Functional Zoning Regulation and The Functional Zoning Map of 2007 divided the city into the following: 1) Inhabited Zone, 2) City Center Zone, 3) Economic Zone, 4) Green Zone, 5) Sports Zone, 6) Hospital Zone, 7) Cemetery Zone.

The aforementioned Functional Zoning Regulation and The Functional Zoning Map are prepared over a period of 3–5 years. In addition, partial plans are laid out for each of the zoning areas. Each plan studies the development of the area, where to set up a school, a kindergarten, a park, a recreational area, etc. The new City Center Masterplan devised by Tirana-based architecture studio "Atelier4" was approved in 2007. The plan covered an area of 40.5 ha (100 acres) which included the historic city center, the creation of a new administrative center, a cultural center and a commercial center.

Under the governance of the Socialist Party, in 2014, Kavajë became part of the “Rilindja Urbane e Qyteteve” (Urban Renaissance of Cities) initiative, which aimed to rehabilitate urban centers across Albania. While the project modernized Kavajë’s infrastructure with a new municipal building, a 2.5 km reconstructed entrance road, and a 3,200 m² park, it also faced criticism for replacing historic shady trees with palm trees, making the city center less walkable due to the heat.

The rehabilitation was controversial for demolishing the “Obelisk of Democracy” (Two Fingers monument), which symbolized Albania's anti-communist struggle in the 1990s. The monument, an emblem of the fight for democracy, was replaced with a red-and-black version that was widely criticized for its aesthetic. A fountain now occupies its original location. The Democratic Party condemned the demolition as an attack on Kavajë’s democratic history, while then-mayor Elvis Rroshi defended it, framing the changes as part of the city's urban modernization, and even suggested sending the demolished monument to the Democratic Party's headquarters in Tirana by helicopter.

== Economy ==
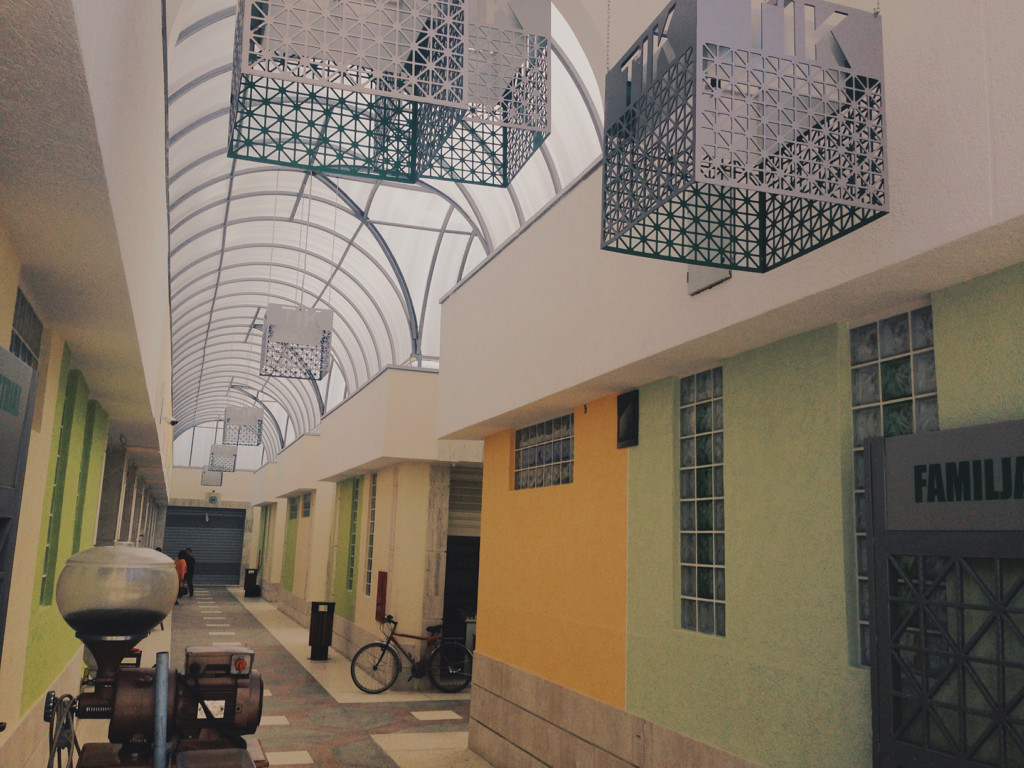
Indoor market

=== Agriculture ===
In Kavajë the climate and soil are suitable for the cultivation of fruits and vegetables, among others strawberries and artichokes. 2,451 ha of agriculture land is used for the cultivation of vegetables where the yield was 186.9 quintals/ha.

Fresh vegetables like: tomatoes, peppers, eggplant, cucumber, leek, cabbage, green beans, okra, spinach, carrots, etc. are planted on 1,214 ha of land with a yield of 179.2 quintals/ha. Dried vegetables such as onions, garlic, etc. are planted on 370 ha of land and yield 75.5 quintals/ha. Watermelons, cantaloupes, etc. are planted on 867 ha of land and provide an output of 245.4 quintals/ha. Potatoes are planted on 450 ha of land and yield 93.7 quintals/ha. Beans are planted on 1,415 ha of land and yield 11.6 quintals/ha.

Fodder is also widely cultivated: hay, clover, corncob, etc. cover 6,924 ha of land and yield an output of 291.3 quintals/ha. The largest production comes from hay.

== Infrastructure ==
=== Education ===
The first Albanian language school opened in Kavajë in the late summer of 1887. The former District of Kavajë has established a public and a private school system which serves for the upbringing and education of the children and youth. Educational Institutions operating in Kavajë are listed as follows:

- 50 kindergartens throughout the district, 7 within the Municipality of Kavajë and 43 in the surrounding communes; plus 2 private kindergartens.
- 42 primary public schools (9-year public schools), 6 within the municipality of Kavajë and 36 in the remaining communes;additionally there are 2 private primary schools.
- 7 secondary level high schools throughout the district: 3 within the municipality of Kavajë and 4 in the surrounding communes.
- 2 general level high schools throughout the district. "Aleksandër Moisiu" High School in the municipality of Kavajë and "Haxhi Qehaj" High School in the municipality of Rrogozhinë; and 2 professional level high schools, one is located in the Municipality of Kavajë and the other in the Commune of Golem.

=== Healthcare ===
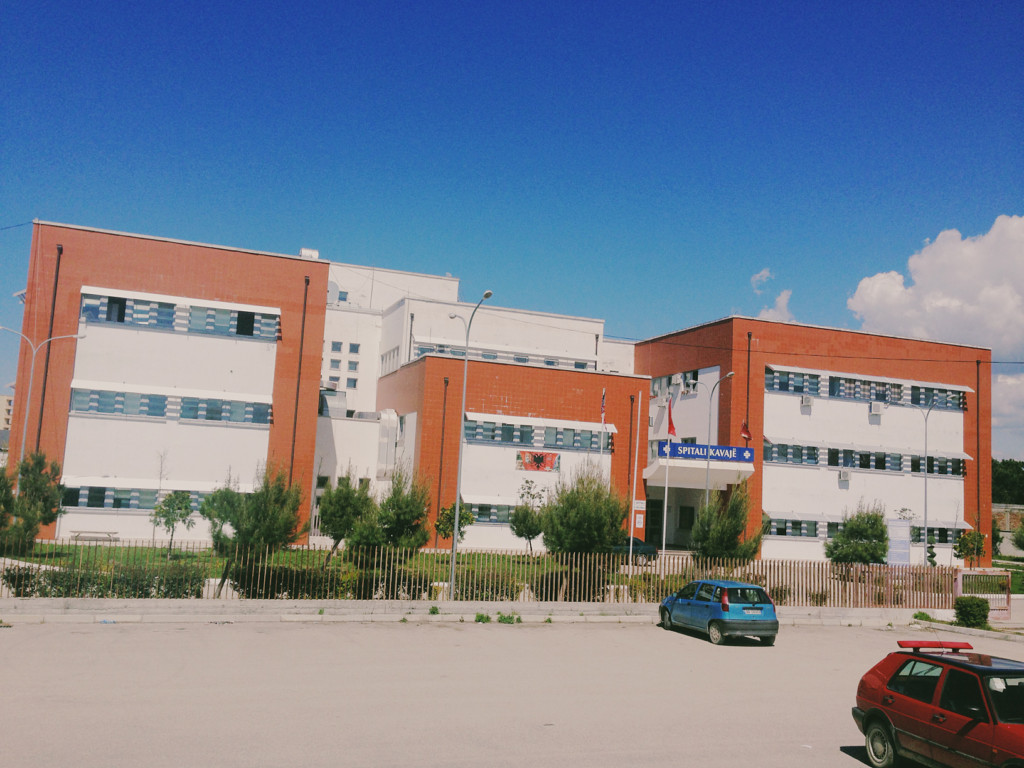
City hospital was inaugurated in 2011

A whole system of public and non-public (private) health institutions operates in the district to provide services and caring to the health of its citizens. In both municipalities operate 178 doctors (40 of which are family doctors) and 240 nurses and assistants. There are 5 hospitals, 11 health centers and 66 ambulances. In 2008 the central government provided funds to build a new hospital for the city. It was inaugurated 3 years later.

The health services provided by all health institutions include the following: Pathology, Pediatrics, Surgery, Cardiology, Infectious Disease Control, Neurology, Psychiatry, Nephrology, Ophthalmology, Dermatology, Orthopedics, Rheumatology, Hematology, Endocrinology, Emergency Services, Allergology, Physio-Therapy, Pediatrics, Gynocology, Obstretics.. etc. Dental Services are fully privatized with the exception of 9-year primary schools. A total of 8 private dental clinics operate in the city of Kavajë. Pharmaceutical Services are also fully private. In the whole district there are a total of 12 pharmacies.

== Culture ==
Theater movement in Kavajë has its origins in early 1919. Several teachers and patriots at the time took the initiative to give spark to the emancipation of the city's cultural life.

In the early 20th century, most folk songs were performed with a flute or kavalli as it was known in this area. Initially made of wood and later of metal, kavalli consisted of two rods, 30 to 35 cm (11.8 to 13.8 in) in length with 6 holes attached to each side and with an upper hole which served as some type of a counterbase. Folk songs were commonly performed by one person. Later performances included more people, mainly in the singing of the chorus. Women always performed together using tambourines.

Folk Dancing
Folk dancing has been a long-standing tradition in Kavajë. Some of the most popular dances include: "Vallja e Zileve", "Vallja e Qypave", "Vallja dyshe e rëndë e Kavajës", "Vallja e Qilimave", etc.

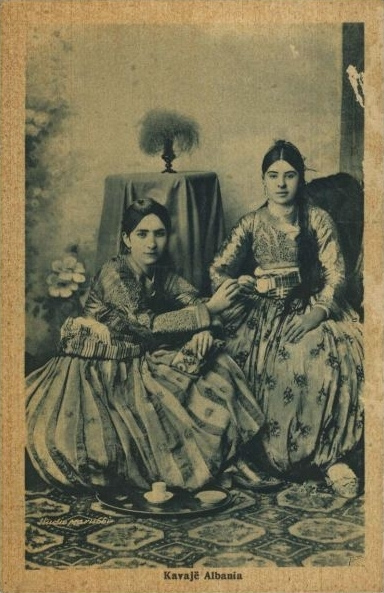
Portrait of two young women wearing traditional clothing (Marubi c.1920)

Historically the most commonly used men's costume was the kilt or the fustanella, which had been in use up until the Proclamation of Independence of 1912. In the later period, looser clothing started to become the trend. Men wore long sleeve shirts accompanied by artistically sewed vests. Trousers were loosely knitted with wool and were black or dark brown. White trousers were used on significant events and holidays. Also included in the costume was a long woolen belt or leather belt, woolen socks and cow leather sandals or moccasins decorated with tufts at the front.

Women's costumes included a type of headdress embroidered with gold and filled with small silver coins. These were typically worn by young brides. Women also wore long-sleeved uncollared shirts, accompanied by a small vest embroidered in silk or gold threads. On the bottom, they wore half slips covered by a type of loosely wrapped clothing known as dimite, which was usually white. For walking, they wore white cotton or silk socks accompanied by tailored shoes, sandals or slippers. When a woman left the house to visit someone, she would wear a long, brightly colored dress made of satin.

Lyrical songs express human feelings and spiritual experiences. They express different moments of a person's life, the joy of love, friendship, grief, hatred and other various phenomena of life's attitudes. Some of the most authentic lyrical songs from this region include: "Mun aty ke shtatë zymbylat", "Këndon gjeli pika-pika", "Kënga e gjemitarit", all believed to have been composed and sung by popular singers of the time like Pol Kanapari, Hasan Sakati, Zenel Kalushi and Islam Xhatufa. Other popular singers include Thabit Rexha, Liri Rama, Desire Pezaku, Nysrete Hylviu and undoubtedly the greatest of them all Parashqevi Simaku.

Historical songs are dedicated to historical events and prominent historical figures. They are generally created by people who lived these events or are in some ways attached to them. The oldest historical song that is well-preserved even today is titled "Kënga për mbrojtjen e Ulqinit". Other historical songs worth mentioning include: "Kënga e Ceno Kavajës", "Kënga e Sulë Mustafës", "Bubullin ke Shkambi Kavajës", etc.

In Albania the phrase "Llogje Kavaje" or "Lloqe Kavaje" (Kavajë Blabber) is a regional pejorative denoting the word gossip. It suggests a person who gossips or says things which evidently turn out not to be true.

A few old proverbs from Kavajë:

- Me fol me ty, si me fol me murin. ("Talking to you is like talking to the wall.")
- U bo veza me mësu pulën. ("Since when does the egg teach the chicken?")
- Rrena osht nona e të këqijave. ("A lie is the mother of all bad things.")
- Breshka po ferrën don. ("A turtle wants only its bush—things eventually settle in their natural habitat.")
- Mjer puna ime, që se boni dora ime. ("Being critical to something which was done by others but could've been done better by myself had I taken the effort.")

=== Cultural heritage ===
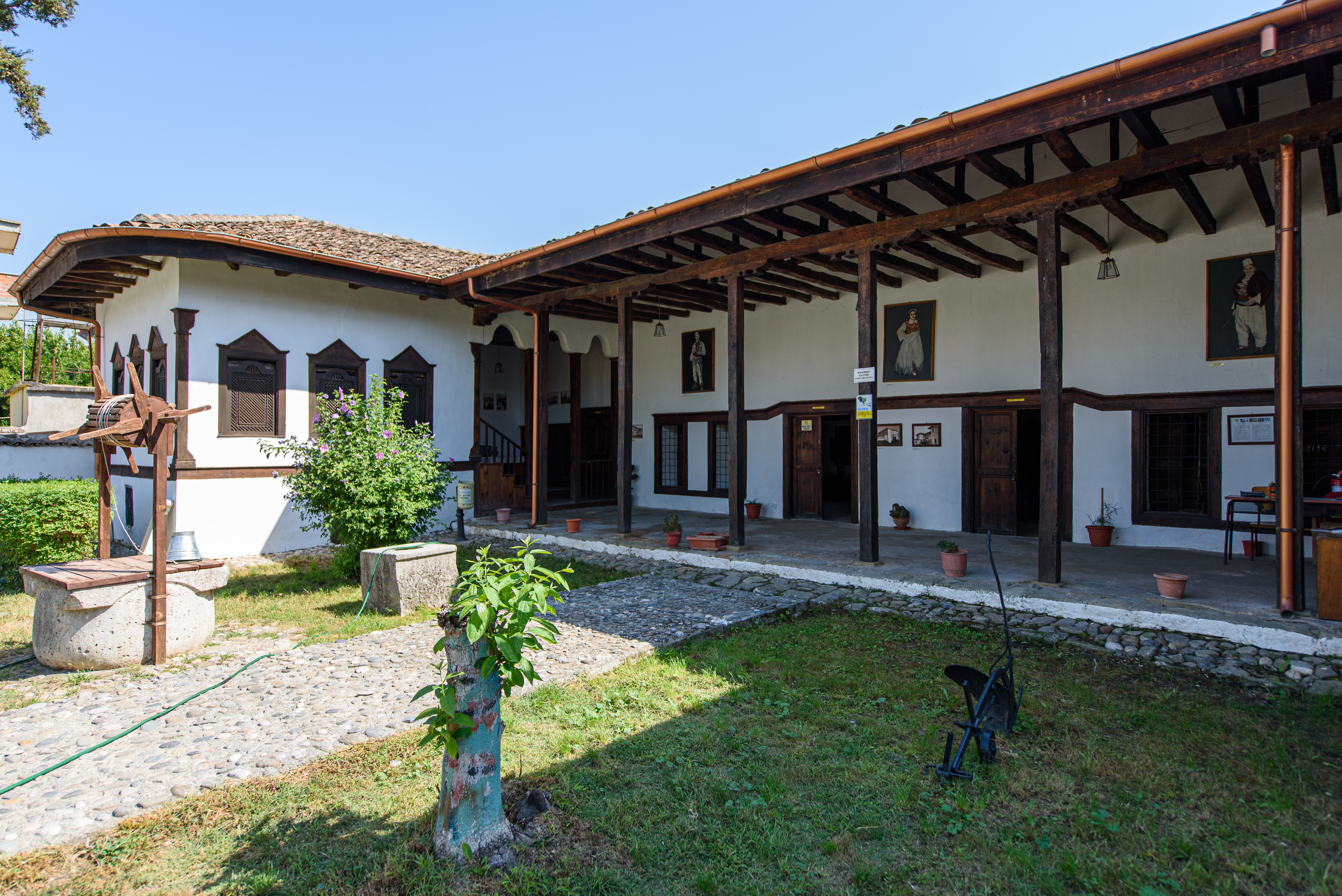
Ethnographic Museum

The Ethnographic Museum of Kavajë, completed in 1971, was built on a restored building with a hajat (gallery), the type of which was widespread throughout the 18th century. Its architectonic origin however dates back to the late antiquity in the typology of a "villa rustica", commonly present in the region. After the full restoration of the building, the newly formed museum would be given the status of a cultural monument. The managing group which programmed the conceptual orientation and realisation of the museum was made up of the most reputable authorities of the time in the studies of ethnography. The main characteristic of the museum's ethnographic fund is defined by the variety of its objects and their diverse origin. Craft works composed in ceramic, copper and textiles from local craftsmen representing the city and the region are present for display. So is a large collection of works from the Northern, North-Eastern and Southern regions of Albania. The elements of the traditional costumes from these regions are distinguished for their level of mastery and finesse, for the richness of the ornaments and symbols merged into geometric, zoomorphic and anthropomorphic forms.

Other Cultural Monuments found in the region of Kavajë: St.Paraskevi's Church (Kisha e Shën Premtes) built in 1280; Clock Tower (Sahati) built in 1817; Bukaq Bridge (Ura e Bukaqit) built in the 18th century; Depots of the former Karpen Saltern (Depot e ish-Kripores së Karpenit) built in the 17th century; Bashtovë Fortress (Kalaja e Bashtovës) built in the 15th century.

=== Media ===
Kavajë has one local television station, TV6 – (former channel 2ATV is no longer operational) – and one local radio station, Radio Fantazia. The now discontinued Kavaja Progres was a weekly publication that began circulation in the late fall of 2007. Printed in a newspaper format, it covered mostly socio-economic issues and other daily aspects of city life. Its editorials were perceived to be overly critical of the then-run democratic administration. The paper's publication abruptly ceased in mid-summer of 2009 with the pretext that it lacked funding. This raised speculations that it had been used as a propaganda piece all along by the local socialist party base, in effort to influence the upcoming general elections.

=== Religion ===
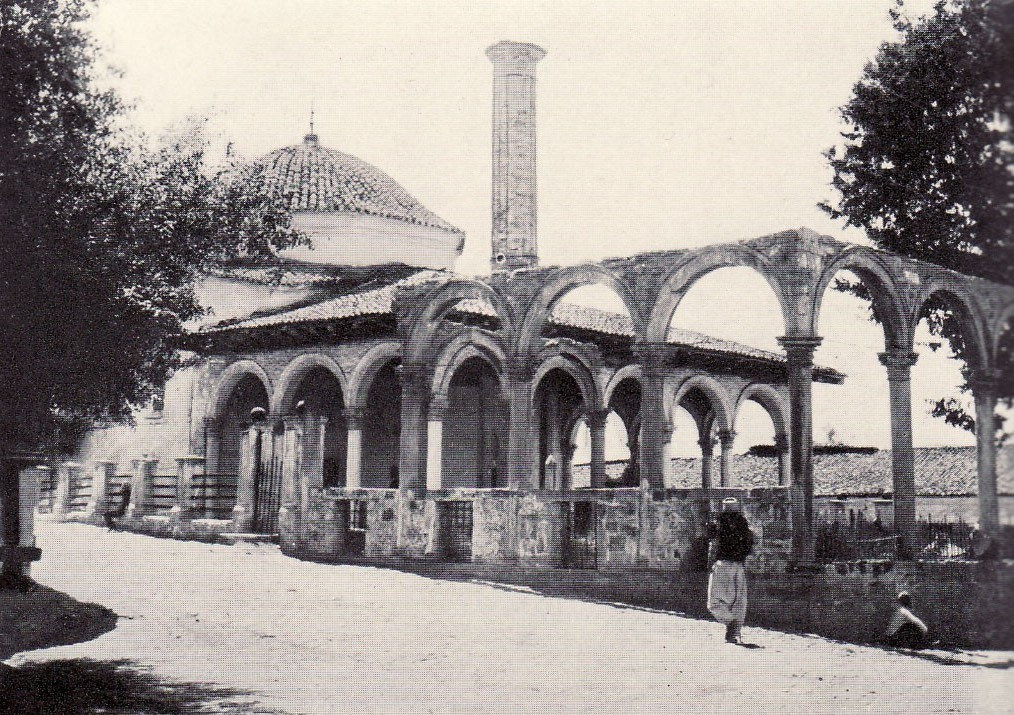
Old photograph of Kubelie Mosque with its columns built in 1735. The minaret gallery is missing due to the 1927 earthquake. (Richard Busch-Zantner, c.1939)

The population of Kavajë belongs in part to two religious denominations, Muslim and Orthodox Christian. The Muslim population nominally makes up ¾ of the total population. The remaining ¼ belong to the Orthodox faith. These are estimates which don't hold into account atheists and other non-believers. The municipality office maintains no official statistics on religion.

The largest of the four mosques in the city is Kubelie Mosque (Xhamia Kubelie), named after the old mosque built by Kapllan Beu in 1736 and later demolished by the communist regime in 1967. The existing mosque was rebuilt in 1994.

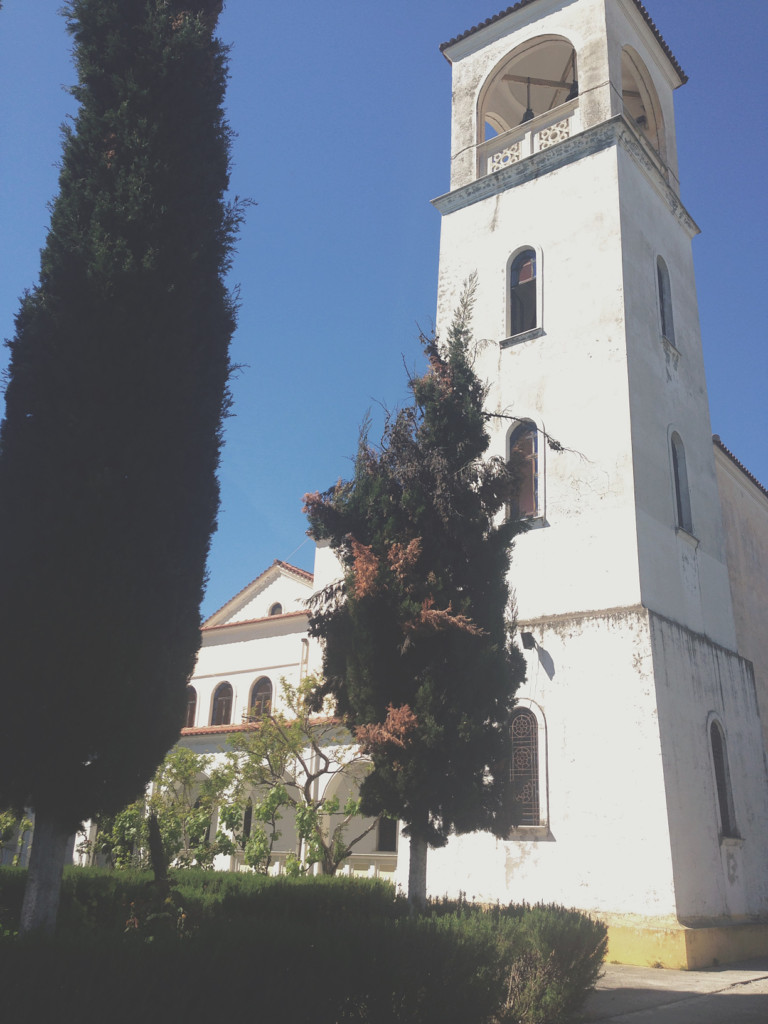
"Church of Saint Nicholas" reconstructed in 1997

The Piety Mosque (Xhamia e Devotshmërisë) was built in the Zguraj neighbourhood in 2001 with funds from a Saudi charity organization. The Dedei Mosque (Xhamia e Haxhi, Mynyre dhe Dervish Dedeit) was built in 2005 with funds from the Dedei Family. There is also a small teqe built in recent years within the city limits and another one in the village of Luz i Madh.

Followers of the orthodox faith attend the Shën Kolli Church located near Besa Stadium. The church was rebuilt in 1997, on the same land as the old one with funds from Greece.

St.Paraskevi's Church (Kisha e Shën Premtes) is located 1.5 kilometres (1 mile) east of Kavajë in the village of Çetë. It was built during the 13th century and today serves as a cultural monument. The frescos inside the church are works of the well-known iconic painter Kostandin Shpataraku.

A smaller church is found in the village of Rreth-Greth, formerly a part of Kryevidh Commune. It's attended by the locals of that area.

=== Sports ===
The small town of Kavajë has a storied history associated with the game of football in Albania. Hometown club Besa, which was founded in 1925, has for decades produced talents for the National Team in all youth and senior levels. In 1973, Besa gained fame for being the first Albanian football club to move into the second round of the UEFA Cup Winner's Cup. Two years prior Besa had been a Balkans Cup finalist, where they lost to Greek side Panionios 2–3 on aggregate. In the competition Besa won Group A against FK Crvenka and Veliko Tarnovo.

The club has won two Albanian Cup titles having appeared in the final eight times. They have placed as Superliga runners-up twice and have established third-place a total of eleven times. Some of the most memorable matches are the 9–1 win over Flamurtari in 1937, the 12–0 win over Elbasani in 1945, the 11–0 win over Apolonia in 1965 and the 7–1 win versus Sk Tirana in 1992.

Besa is also a winner of six different cups. In 1946 it won the "Kryesia e Federatës Sportive" Cup, in 1953 and 1957 it won the "Bashkimet Profesionale të Shqipërisë" Cup, in 1961 and 1963 it won the "Gazeta Sporti" Cup, in 1965 it won the "Gazeta Bashkimi" Cup. Youth team Besa U-19 has been crowned Albanian champions twice, in the 1992–1993 and 2008–2009 seasons. The U-17 team was most recently crowned champions in 2018.

Throughout its history Besa has competed in international tournaments and friendlies against such clubs as Sarajevo, Odra Opole, Dynamo Berlin, Progresul, Veliko Tarnovo, Crvenka, Panionios, Fremad Amager, Hibernian, PAS Giannina, Bezanija, Litex Lovech, Ethnikos Achnas, Grasshopper Zürich, Olympiacos.

The former district region of Kavajë has three other professional football clubs: Egnatia Rrogozhinë, Golemi FC and Luzi United.

== Notable people ==
- Aleksandër Moisiu – 20th century actor of European stage and cinema.
- Spiro Moisiu – Major general of the Albanian National Liberation Army (1943–1944)
- Alfred Moisiu – 5th President of Albania (2002–2007).
- Kristina Koljaka – Albania's first female sculptor.
- Mustafa Krantja – Founder of the first symphonic orchestra in Albania.
- Qemal Vogli – Goalkeeper of the Albania national football team (1947–1953)
- Kolë Xhumari – Author of the children's book Abetare.
- Ermir Dobjani – Albania's first Ombudsman (2000–2010).
- Nexhati Tafa – Screenwriter.
- Parashqevi Simaku – Singer of the 1980s.
- Altin Rraklli – Forward of the Albania national football team (1992–2005)
- Indrit Cara – activist and soldier during the Kosovo War (1998–1999)
- Haxhi Xhaferr Shkodra Religious leader, former first director of the madrasa, outstanding personality honored by the President of the Republic.
- Andi Lila – Defenceman of the Albania national football team
- Sokol Cikalleshi – Striker of the Albania national football team
- Gazment Bardhi – Minister of Justice in 2017.
- Josif Budo – activist who became the first martyr of the anti-communist uprising in Albania.
- Regi Lushkja (born 1996) – footballer
- Rrapush Papoj (born 1965) – cyclist and coach
