= Zik-Xhafaj =

- Village
- Location within Albania
- Coordinates: 41°13′45″N 19°34′1″E
- Country: Albania
- County: Tirana
- Municipality: Kavajë
- Administrative unit: Golem
- Time zone: UTC+1 (CET)
  - Summer (DST): UTC+2 (CEST)
- Postal Code: 2504
- Area Code: (0)55

Zik-Xhafaj is a village in the central plains of Albania's Western Lowlands region, part of Tirana County and, since a 2015 government reformation, of Kavajë municipality.
