= Rrapush Papoj =

Albanian cyclist (born 1965)

Rrapush Papoj (born 12 April 1965, in Kavajë) is a retired Albanian cyclist. He served as head coach of Albania National Cycling Team from 2008 to 2010.
