= St. Paraskevi's Church, Çetë =

13th-century church in Albania

St. Paraskevi's Church
- Kisha e Shën Premtes (Albanian)
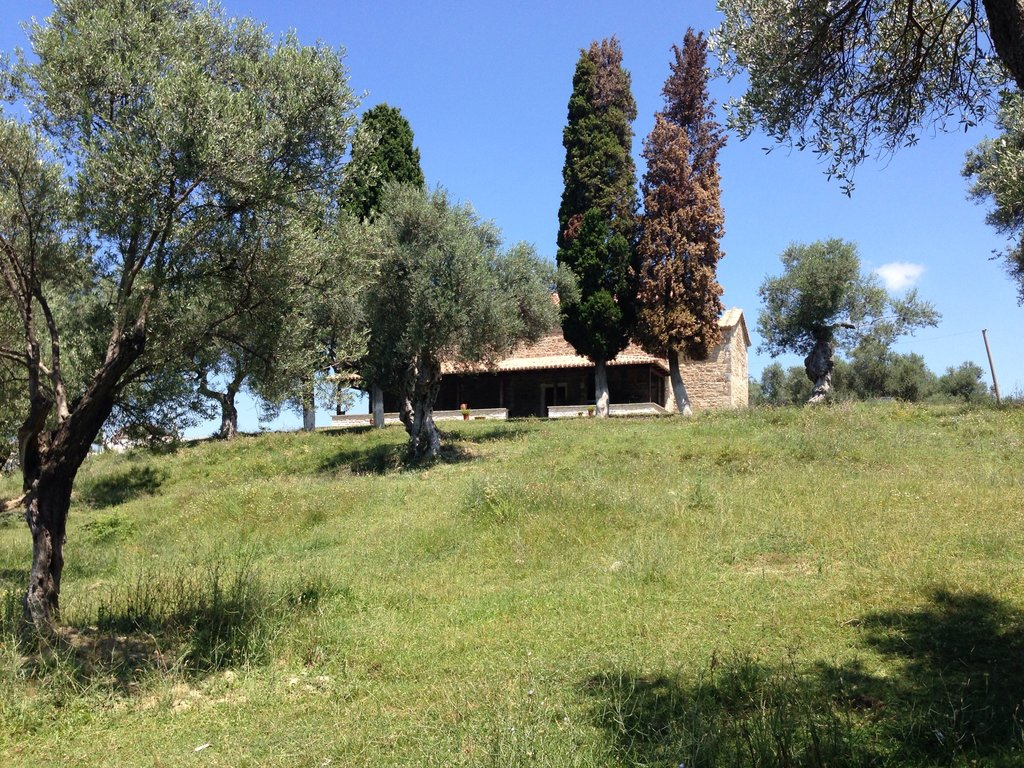
- The church from below the hill where it's situated
- Interactive map of St. Paraskevi's Church
- 41.1990°N 19.5743°E
- Location: Çetë, Kavajë

History
- Built: 13th century

Cultural Monument of Albania
- Designated: 1963

St. Paraskevi's Church (Albanian: Kisha e Shën Premtes) is an Albanian Orthodox church in Çetë, Kavajë Municipality, Albania. It became a Cultural Monument of Albania in 1963.

== History ==
The church is thought to have been built in the 13th century and is the only church left in Albania with a clear gothic architecture. It was built as a Catholic Benedictine church during the time of the Kingdom of Albania. Similar Catholic churches were built during this time both in central and northern Albania, but the Çetë church is the only one still standing. In 1691 the church was transformed into an Orthodox church, painted with frescoes and decorated with icons. The Zografi Brothers painted all four walls. In addition, 16 icons, as well as the iconostas, are attributed to a later, 18th century Kostandin Shpataraku. The iconostas is no longer preserved. Furthermore, many frescoes were destroyed by a fire caused during atheist Albania, which started in 1967. That period, which coincided with the destruction of many religious objects, but did not affect the Çetë church, as the local inhabitants, despite being a Muslim majority, did not accept its destruction.

== Description and local legends ==
The church is composed of the altar, the narthex and the naos. The floor has a circular figure of the sun, which is of interest as the cult of the sun is pre-Christian. According to local legends, three knights were going, through Via Egnatia, from Rome to Jerusalem to liberate the city, as well as the Tomb of Jesus in a crusade. After spending the night in Çetë, the next morning they told one another that they had all dreamt the same dream: Saints had told them to stop in Çetë and build a church there, as it would have been good for the people, and so they built it, before going to Jerusalem. Another legend is similar to the story of Paraskevi of Rome: A young woman who lived in Çetë and had decided to never get married, asked her father to build a church where she would pass the rest of her life praying and helping the people in need. Her father built the church, and when construction was finished, and she wanted to light candles, they would light up by themselves.
