= Kristina Koljaka =

Albanian sculptor (1916–2005)

- Koljaka and her work on a 2023 stamp of Albania
- Born: 4 June 1916; Kavajë, Albania
- Died: 21 October 2005 (aged 90); Milwaukee, Wisconsin, United States
- Education: Accademia di Belle Arti di Roma
- Known for: Sculpture, Ceramics
- Notable work: Statue of Lenin (1954)
- Awards: Merited Sculptor

Kristina Koljaka (Hoshi) (4 June 1916 – 21 October 2005) was an Albanian sculptor and one of the first women to achieve success in sculpture in Albania.

== Early life ==
Kristina Koljaka was born on 4 June 1916, in the city of Kavajë, west-central Albania to Jani Koljaka, an intellectual who was fluent in 12 foreign languages and Angja Petro Bidoshi. She was the second eldest of the couple's seven children.

Kristina fell in love with art in her early youth and her parents cultivated this passion by providing her with professional artistic training in neighboring Italy.

== Education and career ==
Koljaka studied at Tirana's Arts Lyceum from 1930 to 1934. A few years later, she enrolled at the Accademia di Belle Arti di Roma from 1938 until 1941, in the studio of Angelo Zanelli, where years prior, the painters Vangjush Mio (1920–1924) and Zef Kolombi (1929–1933) had studied. Koljaka was a member of the teaching staff at the Jordan Misja Artistic Lyceum along with colleagues Odhise Paskali, Janaq Paço and Sadik Kaceli. She later taught at the Higher Institute of Arts that opened in Tirana in 1960.

She made her début with My Friend (marble, 1941; Rome, private collection). Her success was affirmed with the monumental statue of Vladimir Lenin (bronze, h. 4 m, 1954; Tiranë). She made sculptures on various themes, for example Seedlings (Afforestation) (coloured plaster, 1951), as well as portraits, like the life-size Dr Shiroka (marble, 1956; both Tiranë, A.G.). The gentle plasticity and clear outlines in her work convey a human warmth and awareness of space. The hands and other details of a portrait are often underpinned by a characteristic acumen.

Koljaka is considered among the finest Albanian sculptors and teachers of sculpture. She died on 21 October 2005, at the age of 90.

== Notable works ==
- "Shën Gjon Pagëzori i vogël", portrait in toned plaster (1931)
- "Eros", portrait of a young girl in basorelief plaster (1931)
- "Shipion Afrikani", portrait in plaster (1933)
- "Nerina", portrait in clay (1941)
- "Pyllëzimi", composed in bronze (1951)
- "Gjok Doçi", portrait in plaster (1953)
- "Monumenti i Leninit", composed in bronze (1954)
- "Dita e parë e shkollës", relief in plaster (1955)
- "Fëmijët dhe Pëllumbi", composed in plaster (1955)
- "Doktor Shiroka", worked in marble (1956)
- "Ali Kelmendi", portrait in bronze (1956)
- "Djali me delfin", composed in plaster (1957)
- "Kolektivizimi", relief in plaster (1958)
- "Ndoc Dedë Marku", portrait in plaster (1963)
- "Balerina", composed in plaster (1963)
- "Soprano Tefta Tashko Koço", portrait in plaster (1974)
- "Justina Shkupi", portrait in toned plaster (1974)
- "Dora d'Istria", portrait in plaster (1978)
- "Nëna dhe fëmija", composed in plaster (1983)

== Recognition ==
On 21 April 2000, the municipality of Tirana awarded Koljaka with the title "Gratitude of the City of Tirana". The following year, on 19 January 2001, the municipality of Kavajë presented her the title "Honorary Citizen" of the city by calling her " ...an honorable daughter of the city of Kavajë, the first Albanian female sculptor ...". Seven of Koljaka's works are exhibited at the National Museum of Fine Arts in Tirana, covering the years from 1940 to 1974, a time period which entails the rich history of Albanian art of the twentieth century.
