= Nexhati Tafa =

Albanian screenwriter, producer and director

Nexhati Tafa (born 17 April 1952, in Kavajë) is an Albanian screenwriter, producer and director. He has written screenplays for some of the biggest films Kinostudio Shqipëria e Re has ever produced.

== Feature films ==
- Përdhunuesi (1994)
- Zemra e nënës (1993)
- Vdekja e kalit (1992)
- Enigma (1991)
- Sinjali i dashurisë (1988)
- Treni niset në shtatë pa pesë (1988)
- Të mos heshtësh (1985)
- Taulanti kërkon një motër (1984)
- Shirat e vjeshtës (1984)
- Apasionata (1983)
- Njeriu i mirë (1982)
- Pas vdekjes (1980)
- Një gjeneral kapet rob (1980)
- Dëshmorët e monumenteve (1980)
- Dimri i fundit (1976)
- Tokë e përgjakur (1976)

== Short films ==
- Macet në dëborë
- Pleqëri të mbarë
- Për një centimetër (1990)
- Mundi për tek skena (1988)
- Nuk harrojmë (1986)
- Bijtë e rrugicave me kalldrëm (1982)
- Valbona (1976)
- Poemë e çelikut (1976)
- Fëmijët, balta dhe qelqi (1976)
- Vëllezër Gjimnazistë (1975)

== Animated films ==
- Edi dhe nota 4 (1980)
- Festa e Pranverës (1977)

== Documentaries ==
- Primitiv në një qytetërim të ri
- Lulet e një nate dimri
- Jetë pas vdekjes
- Këngëtari i vdekjes
- Përtej tragjedisë së një dashurie
- Rron o rron, nuk vdes Fan Noli (1997)
- Ali Kelmendi (1981)
- Odise Paskali (1977)
