= Indrit Cara =

Albanian activist and Kosovar military commander (1971–1999)

Indrit Cara alias "Ushtar Kavaja"
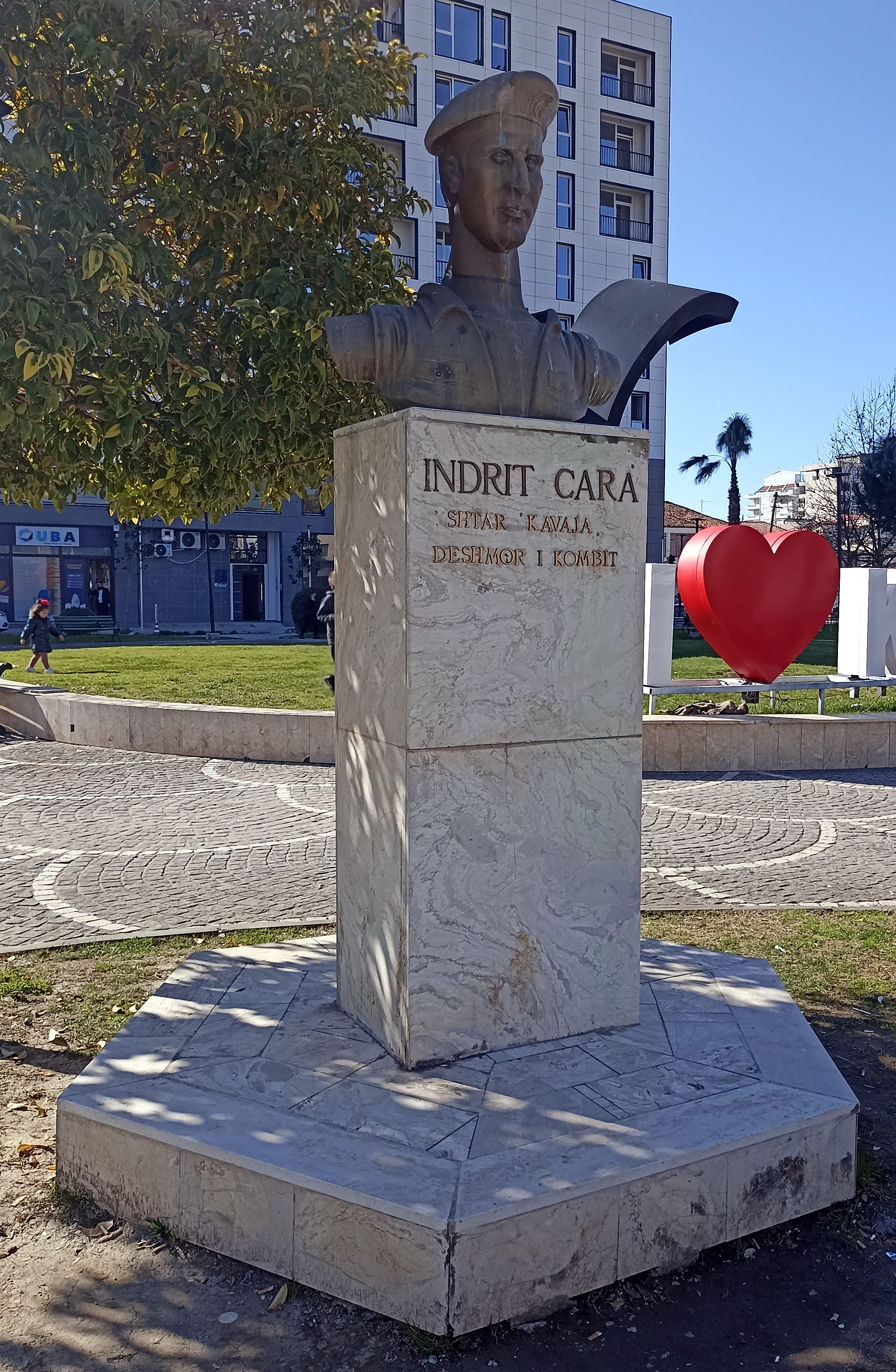
- Statue of Indrit Cara in Kavaja
- Born: 11 July 1971; Kavajë, Albania
- Died: 31 March 1999 (aged 27); Gallusha Mountain,Therandë, Kosovo
- Military career
- Allegiance: Albania; Kosova
- Branch: Albanian People's Army; Kosovo Liberation Army
- Service years: until 1987; 1999
- Rank: Commander
- Unit: 138 Brigade
- Conflicts: Kosovo War: Battle of Gallushë †
- Awards: Hero of Kosovo (posthumously)

Indrit Cara (also known as Ushtar Kavaja; 11 July 1971 – 31 March 1999) was an Albanian activist volunteer and soldier of the Kosovo Liberation Army who died fighting during the Kosovo War.

== Early years ==
Indrit Cara was born into a working-class family in the city of Kavajë, Albania. His parents, Lulëzim and Xhemailia, were both labourers and had two sons, Indrit and Dorijan. Indrit completed his primary education in his hometown, where he achieved excellent academic results. Following his success in primary school, his father aspired for him to become an officer of the Albanian People's Army, a desire shared by Indrit himself.

Later, Indrit Cara moved to London, where he met, worked, and lived with many individuals from Kosovo.

== Kosovo War ==
In early 1999, Indrit Cara left London for Albania with the intention of joining the Kosovo Liberation Army (KLA) in the Kosovo War. After reuniting with his parents in Albania, whom he had not seen in eight years, he quickly left with three friends from Kosovo, with whom he had previously lived in emigration. They initially attempted to enter Kosovo via Kukës but were stopped by Albanian police and returned to Tirana. After their release, facilitated by the Albanian ambassador in London, they made another attempt in early March 1999, crossing Lake Fierza secretly to reach Nashec and Pagarushë, where an offensive by the Serbian army against the Pashtriku area was imminent.

Upon arriving at the gathering point, Indrit and his companions from Llap (region) encountered officers from the KLA General Staff, including Shpëtim Golemi, who recognised Indrit by his non-Kosovan dialect. Learning that Indrit was from Kavajë and had attended the same military schools, Golemi appointed him as a leading cadre in the autonomous company of the KLA General Staff, based in Divjakë in the Berisha mountains.

On 31 March 1999, amidst intense fighting in the Pashtrik area, Indrit led a platoon to retake and hold the peak of Gallusha Mountain, aiming to flank the enemy. Despite harsh winter conditions and a fierce Serbian counterattack, Indrit and his platoon held their position, inflicting significant losses on the enemy. That evening, as the enemy withdrew, it was discovered that Indrit Cara had fallen in Battle of Gallushë. He was buried in Negroc, honoured with a military salute.

== Legacy ==
In 2009, ten years after his passing, Kosovo's president Fatmir Sejdiu, awarded him the medal of freedom "Adem Jashari" for bravery in combat. The song "Ushtar Kavaja" performed by singer Ilir Shaqiri is dedicated to Indrit. Cara is also named honorary citizen of his hometown, Kavajë and a street in the city bears his name. A sculpture statue in honour of him is placed at the city center of Kavaja.
