= Shkëmbi i Kavajës =

Coordinates: 41.2825°N 19.5158°E

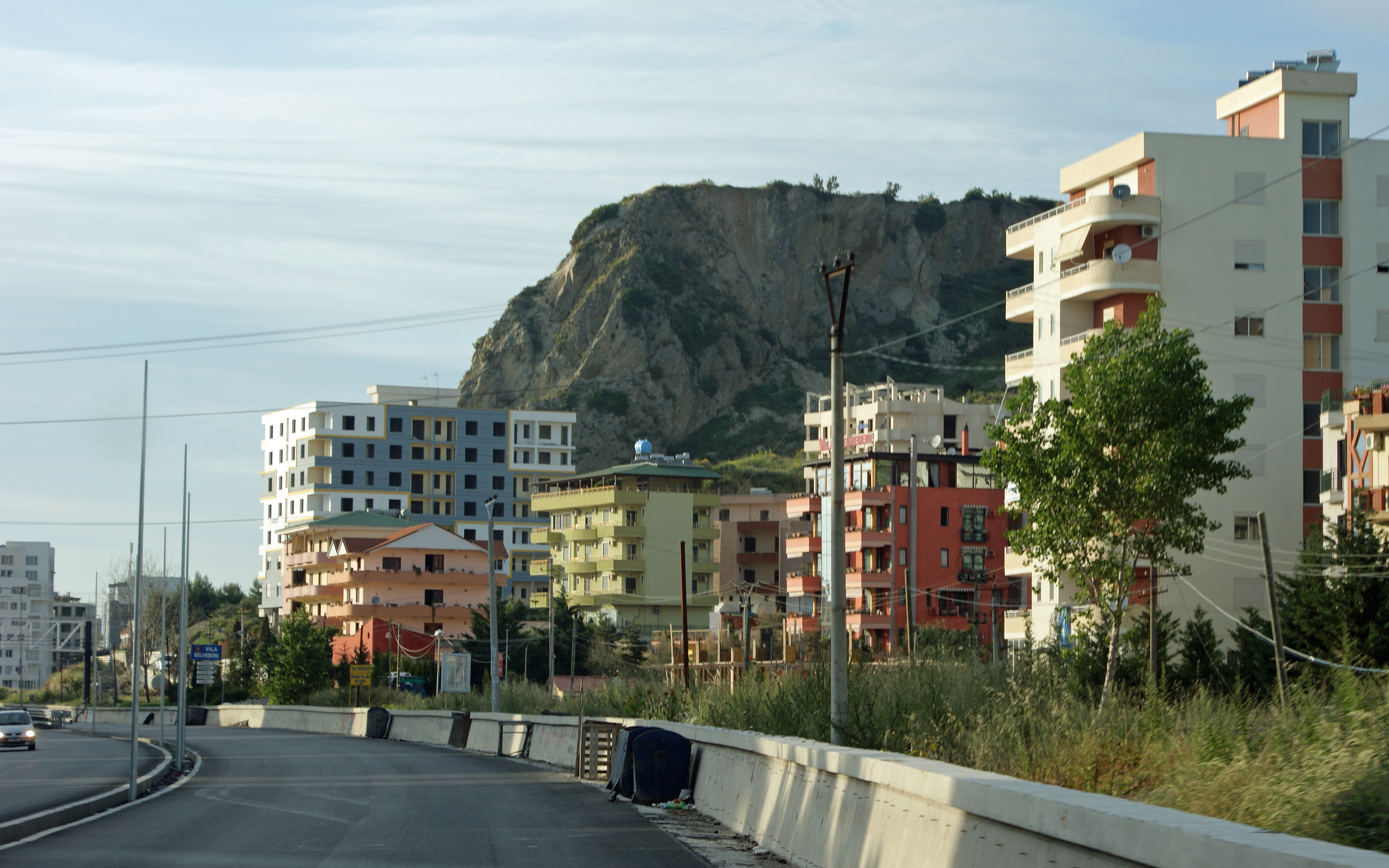
Shkëmbi i Kavajës

Shkëmbi i Kavajës (Rock of Kavajë) is a landmark named after the town of Kavajë, Albania. The outsized rock is about 6 kilometers from Kavajë and about 8 kilometers from Durrës. It is said to be the place where, in 48 BC, during Caesar's Civil War, Caesar fought against Pompey.
