= Xhafa (surname) =

Xhafa and Xhafaj are Albanian surnames that may refer to

- Daniel Xhafaj (born 1977), Albanian football striker
- Erion Xhafa (born 1982), Albanian football defender
- Etjen Xhafaj (born 1982), Albanian politician and public administrator
- Fatmir Xhafaj (born 1959), Albanian politician
- Fjodor Xhafa (born 1977), Albanian football striker
- Gani Xhafa (born 1946), Albanian footballer
- Pleurad Xhafa, Albanian artist, documentary filmmaker and activist
- Sislej Xhafa (born 1970), Kosovar Albanian contemporary artist
- Uran Xhafa, Albanian footballer
