= Luz i Vogël =

- Administrative unit
- Emblem

- Location within Albania
- Coordinates: 41°7′34″N 19°34′30″E
- Country: Albania
- County: Tirana
- Municipality: Kavajë

Population (2011)
  - Administrative unit: 4,735
- Time zone: UTC+1 (CET)
  - Summer (DST): UTC+2 (CEST)
- Postal Code: 2509
- Area Code: (0)579

Luz i Vogël is a village and an administrative unit situated in the central plains of Albania's Western Lowlands region. A former rural municipality, it is now part of Tirana County. At the 2015 local government reform it became a subdivision of the municipality Kavajë. The population at the 2011 census was 4,735.

== See also ==
- Luzi United
