= Synej =

Village in Albania

- Administrative unit
- Emblem

- Location within Albania
- Coordinates: 41°10′53″N 19°32′28″E
- Country: Albania
- County: Tirana
- Municipality: Kavajë

Population (2011)
  - Administrative unit: 5,034
- Time zone: UTC+1 (CET)
  - Summer (DST): UTC+2 (CEST)
- Postal Code: 2505
- Area Code: (0)578

Synej (Albanian: [synɛj]) is a village and administrative unit in the municipality of Kavajë, central Albania. As of the 2011 census, the administrative unit of Synej had an estimated population of 5,034 of whom 2,374 were men and 2,660 women.

The Përroi i Darçit stream passes through the lowlands from the east to the west. The Hajdaraj Reservoir is the main water resource for the community of this area. Plazhi i Gjeneralit is located in Peqinaj. The tourism landscape here has been complemented by the construction of wooden cabins. The beach provides vacationers a level of tranquility and clean air that is unfound in larger urban areas.
