= Helmas =

- Administrative unit
- Location within Albania
- Coordinates: 41°10′45″N 19°35′54″E
- Country: Albania
- County: Tirana
- Municipality: Kavajë

Population (2011)
  - Administrative unit: 3,139
- Time zone: UTC+1 (CET)
  - Summer (DST): UTC+2 (CEST)
- Postal Code: 2506
- Area Code: (0)579

Helmas (also known as Helmës) is a village and a former rural municipality situated in the central plains of Albania's Western Lowlands region. It is part of Tirana County. At the 2015 local government reform it became a subdivision of the municipality Kavajë. The population at the 2011 census was 3,139.
