= Golem, Kavajë =

Golem
- Administrative unit
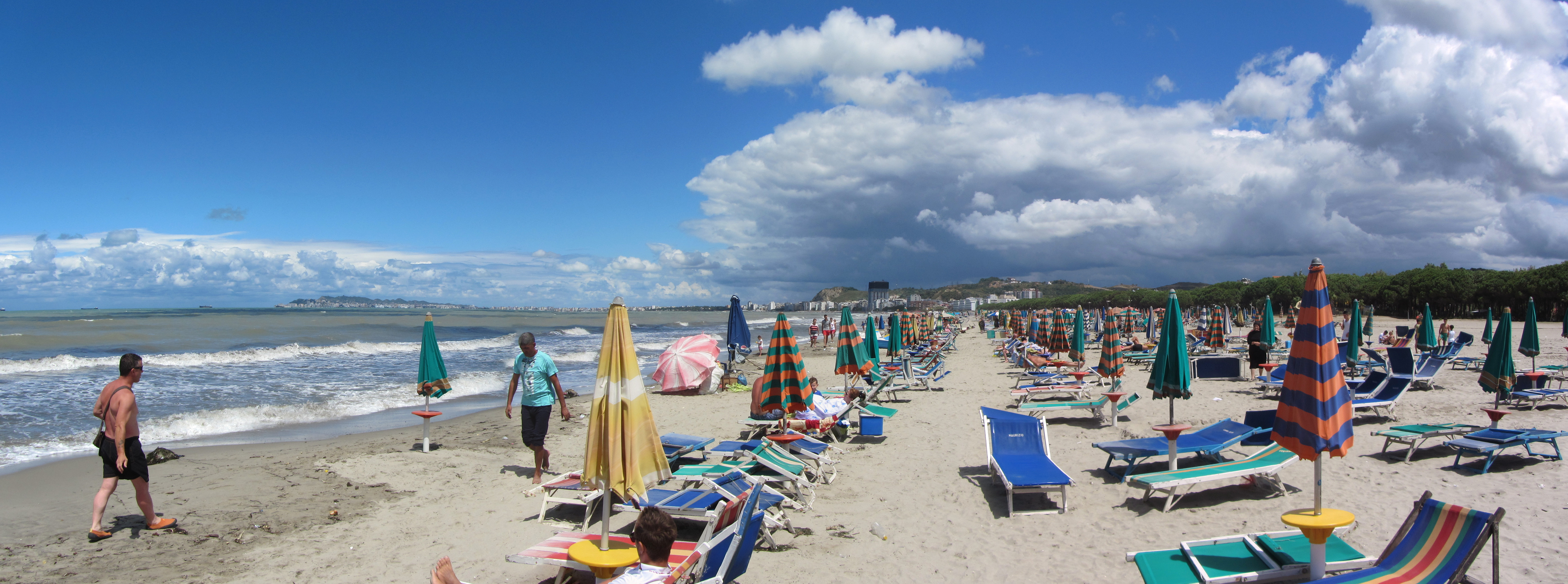

- Emblem

- Location within Albania
- Coordinates: 41°14′52″N 19°31′54″E
- Country: Albania
- County: Tirana
- Municipality: Kavajë

Population (2011)
  - Administrative unit: 6,994
- Time zone: UTC+1 (CET)
  - Summer (DST): UTC+2 (CEST)
- Postal Code: 2504
- Area Code: (0)578

Golem (Albanian definite form: Golemi) is a coastal village and an administrative unit in Tirana County, Albania. A former rural municipality, at the 2015 local government reform it became a subdivision of the municipality Kavajë. The population at the 2011 census was 6,994. The area along the coast is one of Albania's major beach destinations where many resorts, hotels, and vacation homes are located. Golem has experienced rapid urban development and the problems associated with it.

== Gallery ==
Meteor Square

Hotel on the seaside

Hotel in town center

Hotel on the seaside

Promenade in Golem

Promenade in Golem

Square in Golem with monument for the town's martyrs

Monument for the martyrs of Golem

The Mosque of Golem

The Mosque of Golem
