= Albanian Coastal Lowlands =

Geographical region of Albania

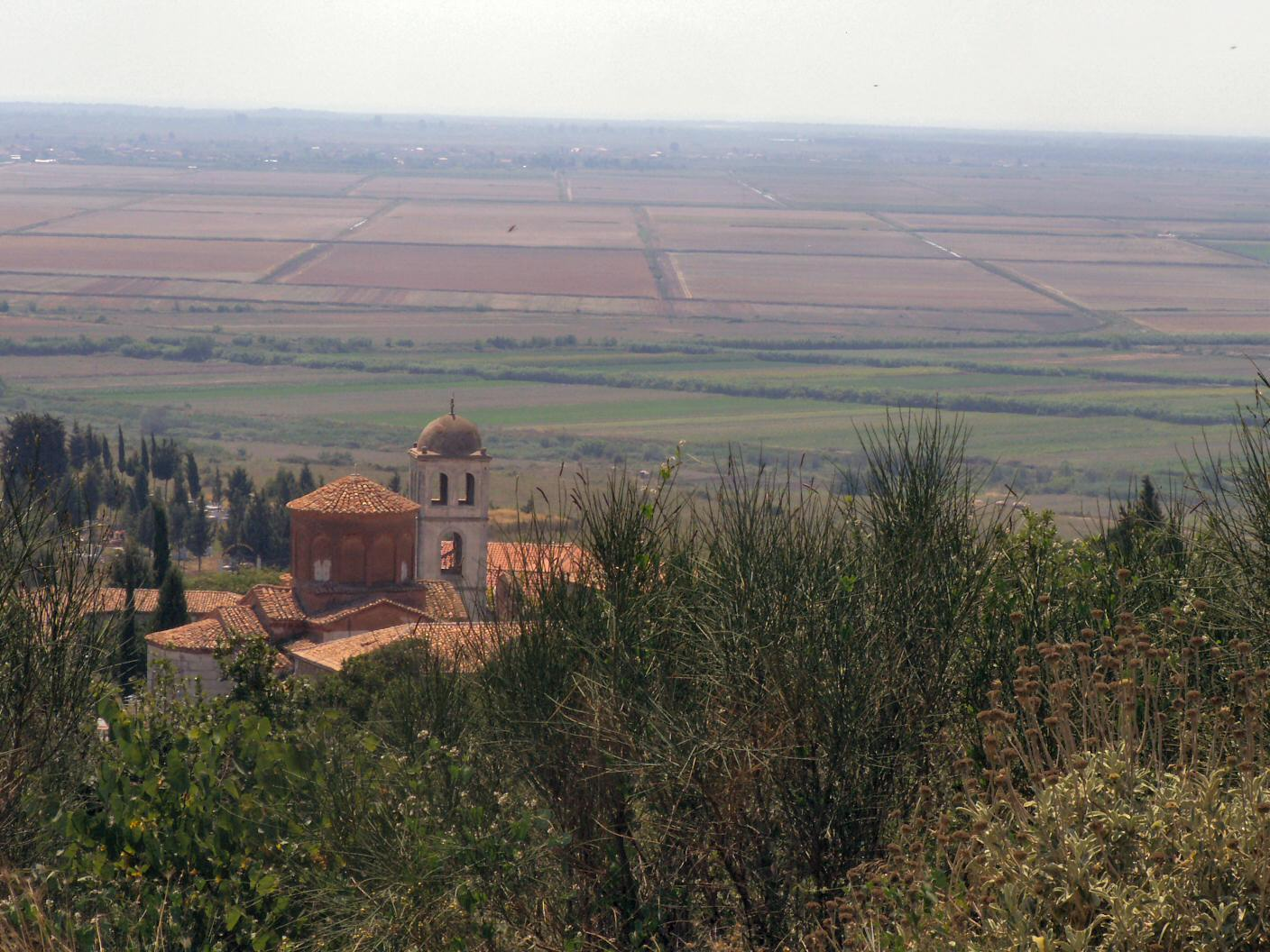

The Coastal Lowlands (Albanian: Ultësira Bregdetare) is a physiogeographical region encompassing the western edge of Albania. It comprises the flat plains extending in the west along the Albanian Adriatic and Ionian Sea Coast that are surrounded by hills and mountains as for instance in the northeast by the Albanian Alps, in the east by the Skanderbeg Mountains, in the southeast by the Pindus Mountains and in the southwest by the Ceraunian Mountains. Nonetheless, the largest and widest plain, measured by area, is the plain of Myzeqe.

== See also ==
- Albanian Adriatic Sea Coast
- Albanian Ionian Sea Coast
