= Ancient walls of Durrës =

Fortified walls in Durrës, Albania

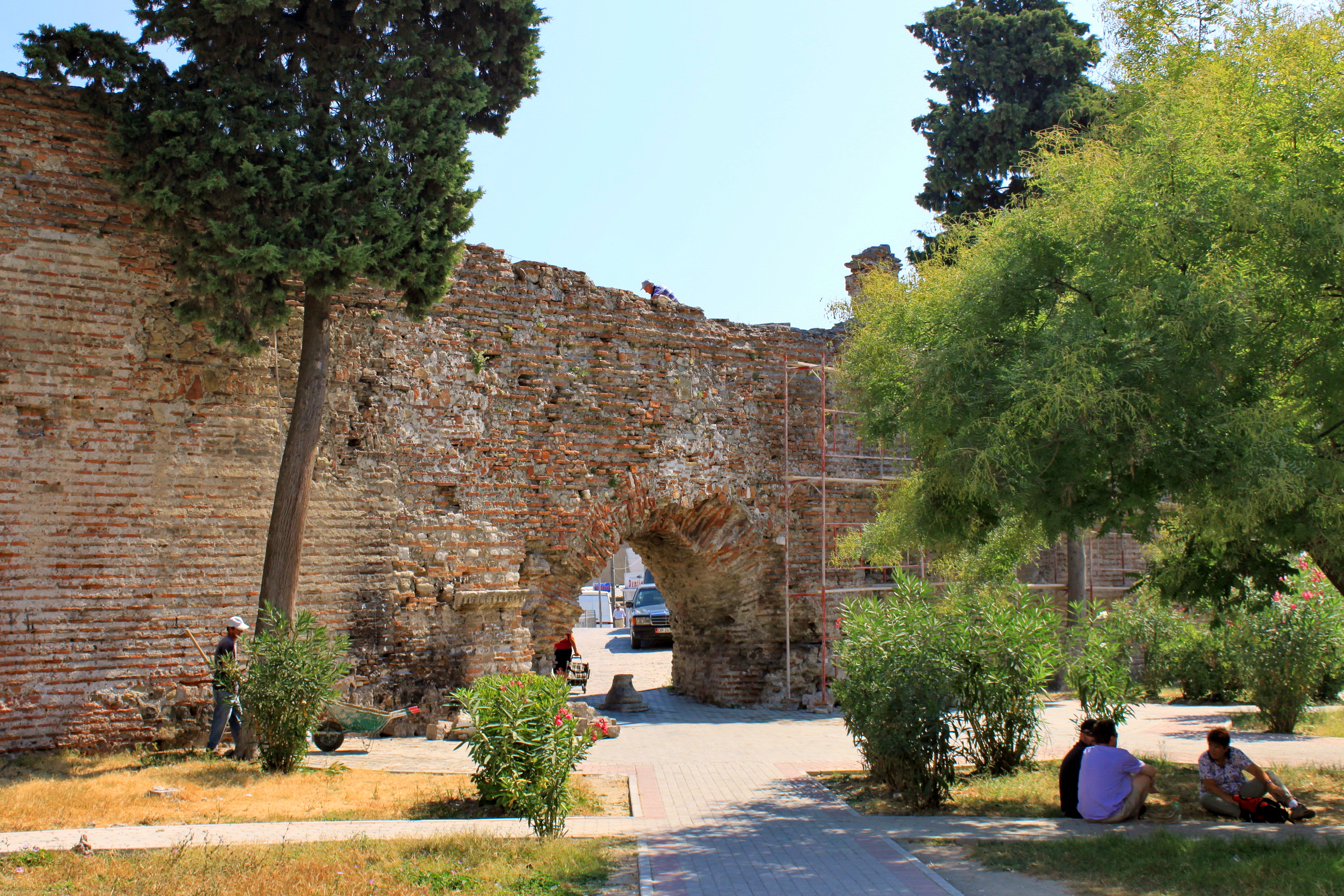
The Ancient walls of Durrës

The ancient walls of Durrës (Albanian: Muret e lashta të Durrësit) are ancient fortified walls in Albania. They were built from the 3rd century to the 5th century AD by the Byzantines to protect the city of Durrës from possible invasion of foreign conquerors. The walls attracts many tourists each year.
