= Port of Durrës =

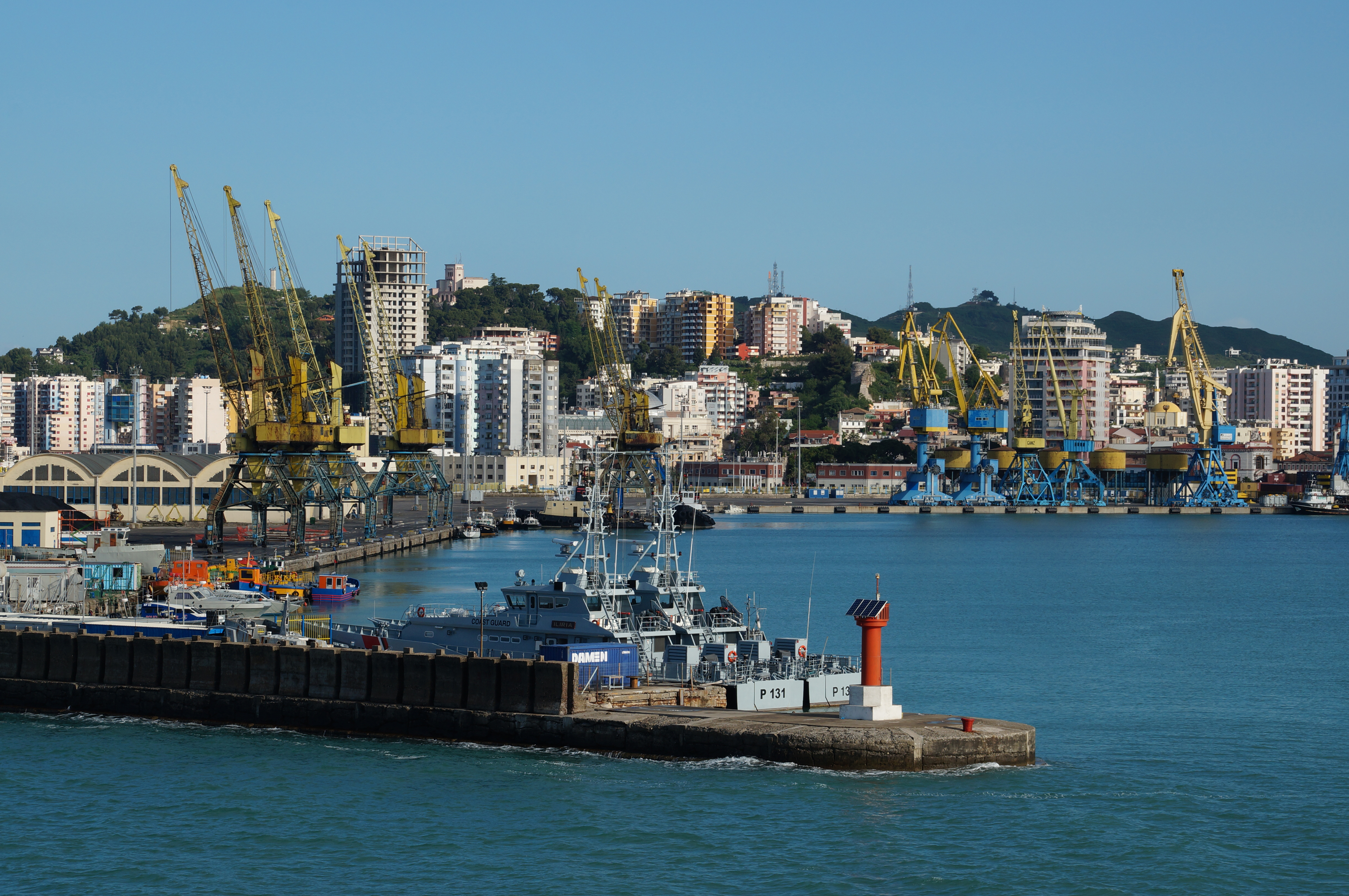
- Interactive map of Port of Durrës

Location
- Country: Albania
- Location: Durrës, Albania
- Coordinates: 41°18′35″N 19°27′26″E
- UN/LOCODE: ALDRZ

Details
- Opened: Since Illyrians 7th century BC
- Operated by: Durrës Port Authority
- Owned by: Government of Albania
- Type of Harbor: Artificial
- Size of harbour: 67 hectares
- Land area: 80 hectares
- No. of berths: 10
- Draft depth: 11.2 m.
- Employees: 623 (2009)
- Water Depth: Channel 26 - 30 feet (7.1 - 9.1 meters), Cargo Pier 21 - 25 feet (6.4 - 7.6 meters), Oil Terminal 21 - 25 feet (6.4 - 7.6 meters)
- Anchorage: 31 - 35 feet (9.4 - 10 meters)

Statistics
- Annual cargo tonnage: ▲7,352,000 tons (2024)
- Annual container volume: ▲196,507 TEU (2024)
- Passenger traffic: ▼774,915 (2024)
- Website durresport.al

The Port of Durrës (Albanian: Porti i Durrësit) is the largest seaport of Albania. The port is situated in the city of Durrës. It is an artificial basin that is formed between two moles, with a west-northwesterly oriented entrance approximately 183 metres (600 ft) wide as it passes between the ends of the moles. The Port is located at the north end of the Bay of Durrës, an extensive body of water between Kalaja e Turrës and Cape Durrës. Cape Durrës is located approximately 1.6 kilometres (0.99 mi) west of the Port of Durrës.

As of 2014, the port ranks as the largest passenger port in Albania and one of the largest passenger port in the Adriatic Sea, with annual passenger volume of approximately 1.5 million.

The Port of Durrës has approximately 763 metres (2,503 ft) of alongside pier space on the West Mole and a fishing harbour lies at the north end of the East Mole. Several wrecks are located near the entrance channel to the Port of Durrës. The use of tugboats is compulsory in the Port of Durrës. As of 2011, the port underwent major renovation and expansion.

The Albanian government is planning to relocate the existing port northward to Porto Romano area and build on the current port grounds of a luxury marina. The Durrës Yachts & Marina project is planned to be built by Dubai-based company Emaar, consisting of residential construction development, recreational areas, and marina for super yachts.

== History ==
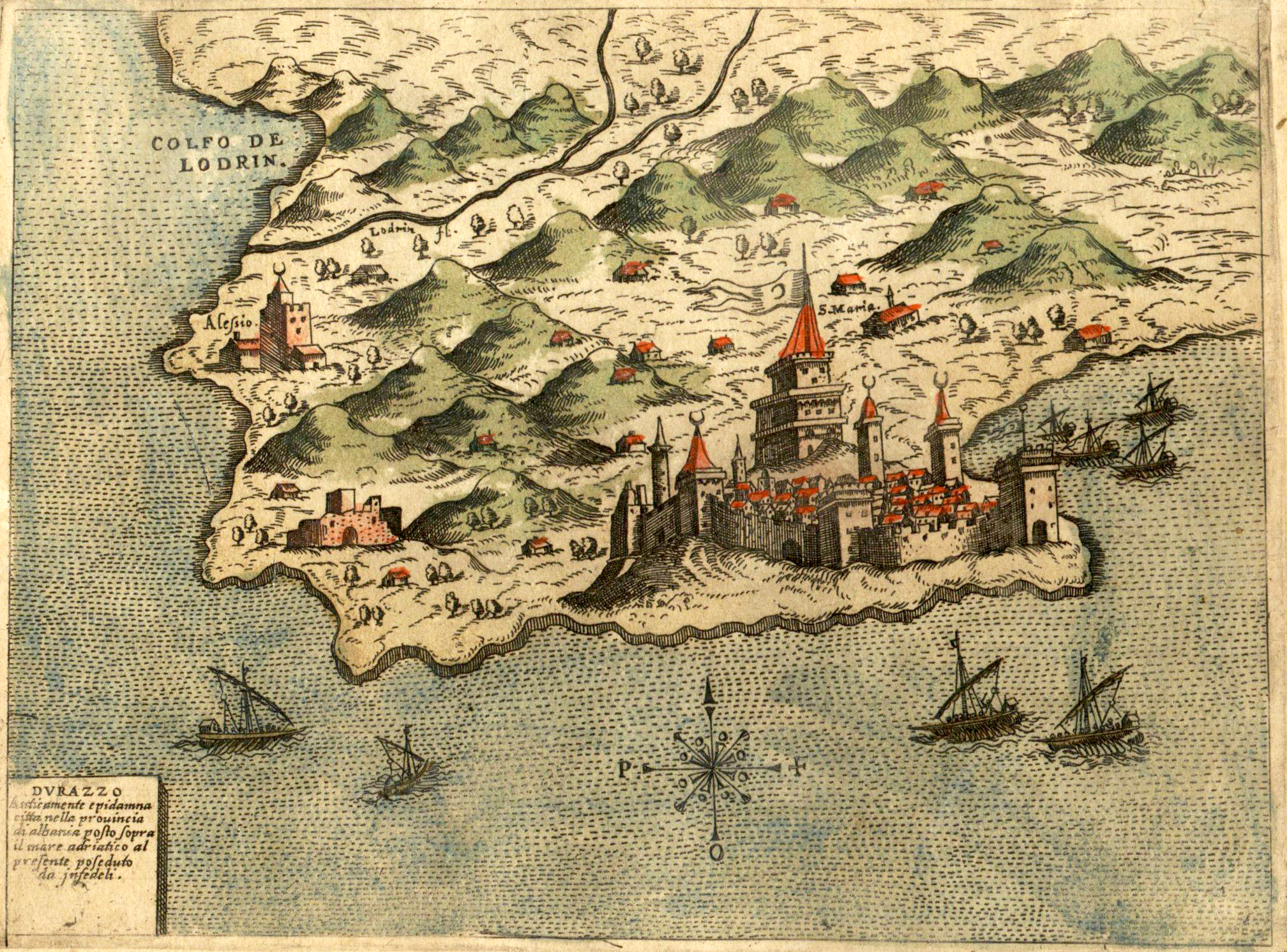
Port of Durrës in 1573

Epidamnos (Durrës) was seized by Glaukias, the king of Illyria, in 312 BC, but after a war with the Roman Republic in 229 BC ended in a defeat for the Illyrians, the city passed to Roman rule, under which it was developed as a major military and naval base. The Romans renamed it Dyrrachium (Greek: Δυρράχιον, Dyrrhachion). They considered the name Epidamnos to be inauspicious because of its coincidental similarities with the Latin word damnum, meaning "loss" or "harm". The meaning of Dyrrachium ("bad spine" or "difficult ridge" in Greek) is unclear, but it has been suggested that it refers to the imposing cliffs near the city. Julius Caesar's rival Pompey made a stand there in 48 BC before fleeing south to Greece. Under Roman rule, Dyrrachium became the western end of the Via Egnatia. The Roman emperor Caesar Augustus made the city a colony for veterans of his legions following the Battle of Actium, proclaiming it a civitas libera (lit. 'free city').

In the 4th century AD, Dyrrachium was made the capital of the Roman province of Epirus nova. It was the birthplace of the emperor Anastasius I in circa 430. Some time later that century, Dyrrachium was struck by a powerful earthquake, which destroyed the city's defences. Anastasius I rebuilt and strengthened the city walls. According to the Byzantine historian Anna Komnene, four horsemen could ride abreast on the 12 m (36 ft)-high walls. Significant portions of the ancient city defences still remain.

Like much of the rest of the Balkans, Dyrrachium and the surrounding Dyrraciensis province suffered from barbarian incursions during the Migration Period. It was besieged in 481 by Theodoric the Great, king of the Ostrogoths, and in subsequent centuries, it had to fend off attacks by the Bulgarians. Unaffected by the fall of the Western Roman Empire, the city continued under the Byzantine Empire as an important port and a major link between the Empire and Western Europe. During communism in Albania, the port was named after Albanian communist leader, Enver Hoxha.

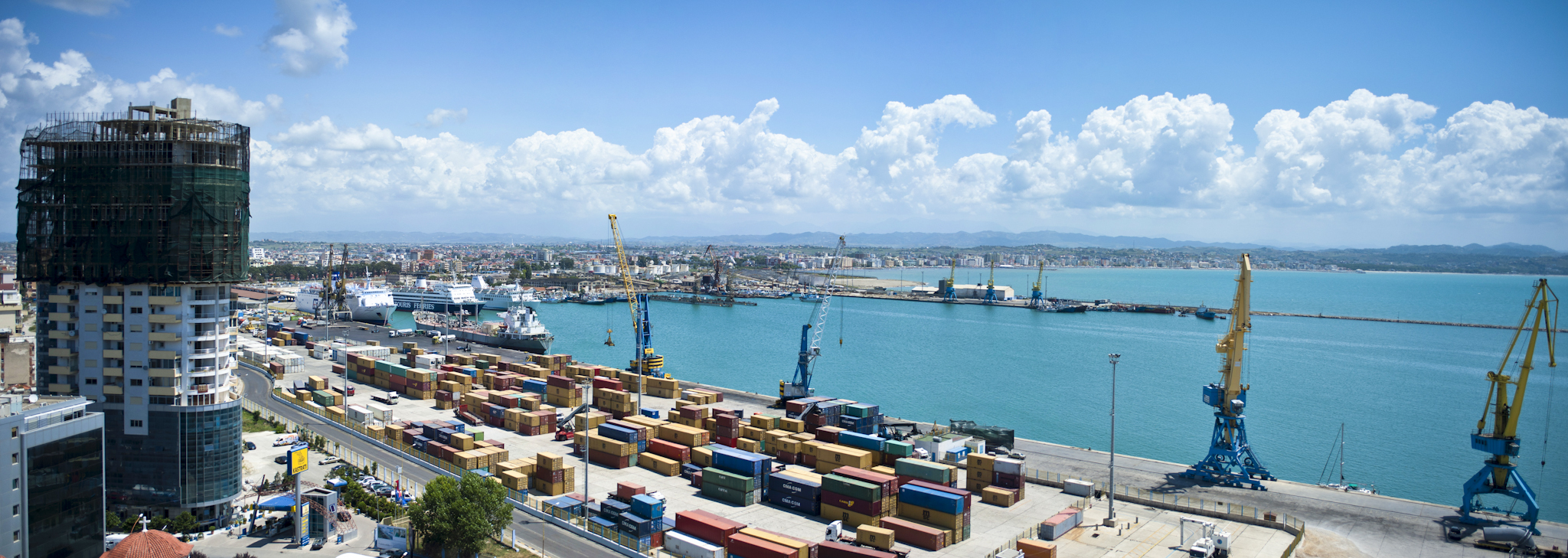
Panoramic view over the port

A small harbor for fishing boats was built on the west mole and opened in 2013. The fishing port is protected by a small new pier. The port of Durrës is regularly visited by various ferries. Most ferries connect Durrës with Bari and Ancona, some also with Trieste and rarely with Brindisi. A new ferry terminal opened in 2013.

In 2019, 878,687 passengers and 259,175 vehicles were shipped on 1052 ferries respectively. 19 cruise ships with over 4500 passengers on board called at the port in 2019. Since the beginning of 2019, there has been a customs office of the Republic of Kosovo in the port. It was intended to simplify the import of goods to Kosovo and relieve the Vërmica/Morina border crossing.

== Terminals ==
The Port of Durrës contains several terminals serving different types of cargo and passenger traffic. The port's container operations are handled by Durrës Container Terminal (DCT), while the East Terminal is operated by EMS Albanian Port Operator (EMS APO), which handles bulk cargo, breakbulk cargo, project cargo and related logistics services.

The port also includes facilities for passenger ferries, general cargo, and liquid cargo operations.

== See also ==
- Durrës
- Economy of Albania
- Transport in Albania
- Adriatic Sea
