= Kajtazi Brothers Educational Institute =

Kajtazi Brothers Educational Institute Instituti Arsimor Vëllezërit Kajtazi
- Type: Private school
- Established: 2001
- President: Kujtim Kajtazi
- Director: Prof. Bedri Karapici
- Campus: Vaqarr, Tirana

Kajtazi Brothers Educational Institute (Albanian: Instituti Arsimor Vëllezërit Kajtazi; formally Kajtazi Brothers Educational Institute Tirana, or VKT) is a non-public school in Albania.

It was established in 2001 with the licensing of the Ministry of Education and Sciences on the outskirts of the city of Tirana, Vaqarr and then in 2002 opened its branch in the city of Durrës. In 2001, the Institute of Education Kajtazi Brothers developed basic 8-year-old education and secondary education for 4-year-olds. In September 2011, the branch in Durrës closed.

== Notable alumni ==
- Almeda Abazi - Miss Tirana 2007, Miss Shqipëria 2008, Prezë Castle Venue and Miss Globe International 2008
- Albi Dosti - professional footballer of KS Teuta and Albania U-21

== See also ==
- Ministry of Education and Sciences (Albania)
