= Durrës =

Second-largest city of Albania

- Municipality and city
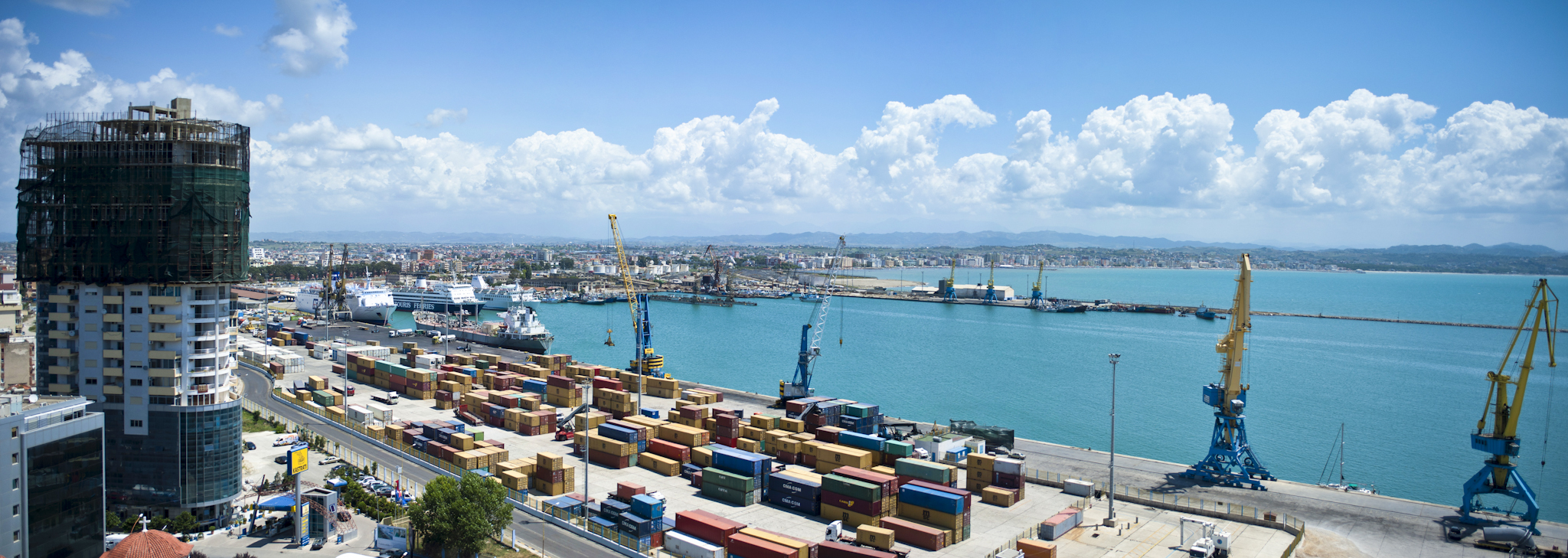
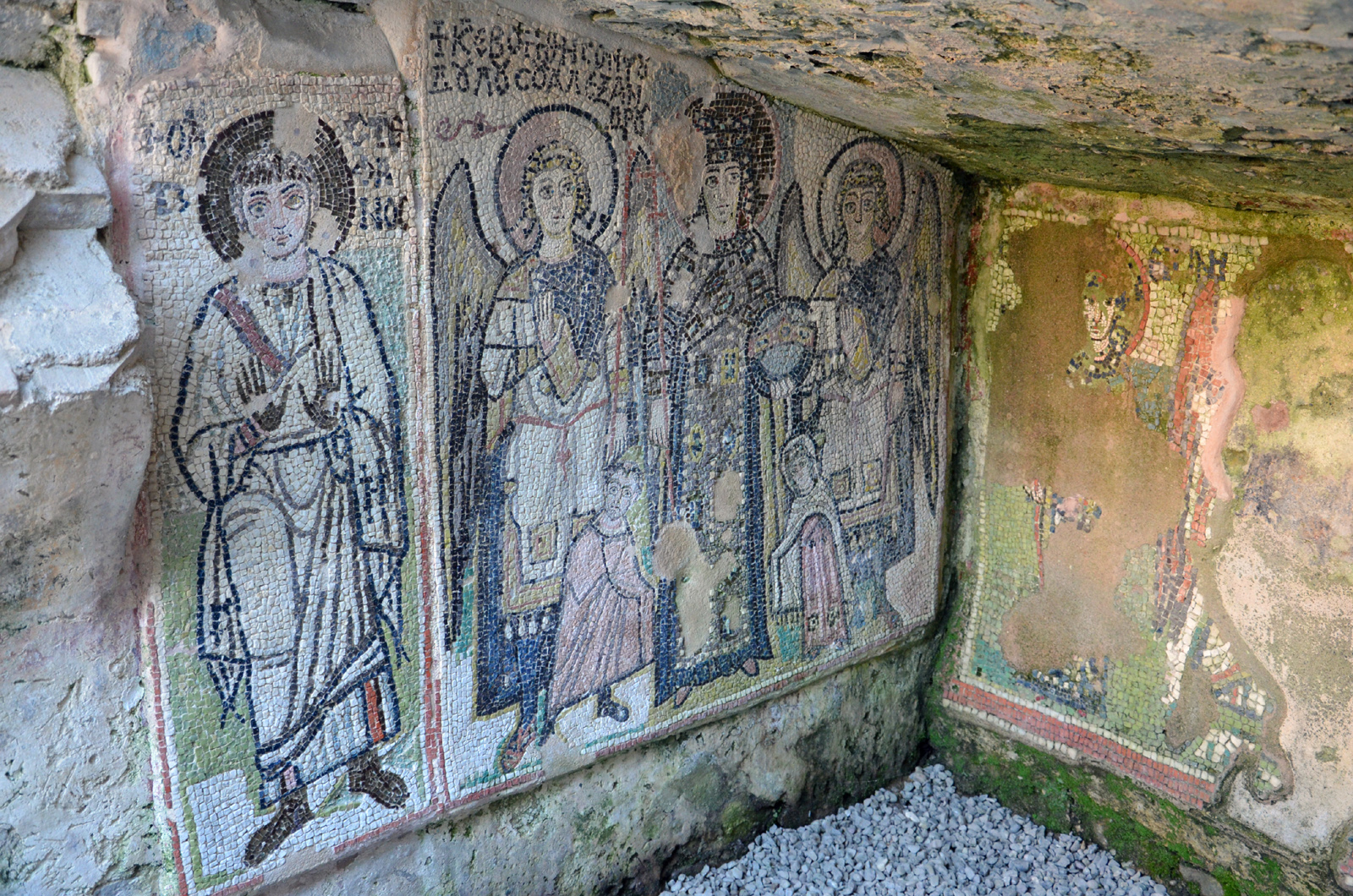
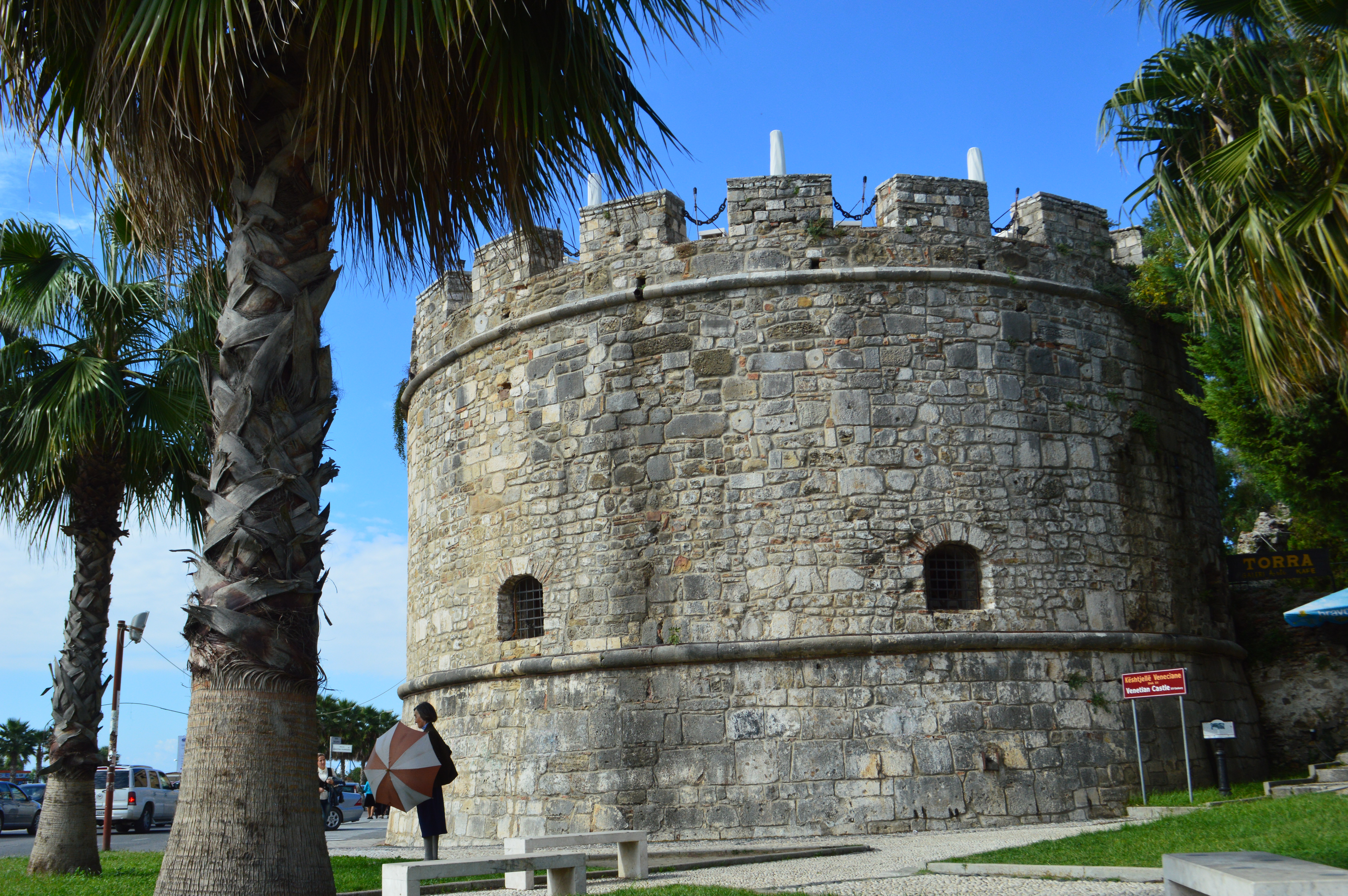
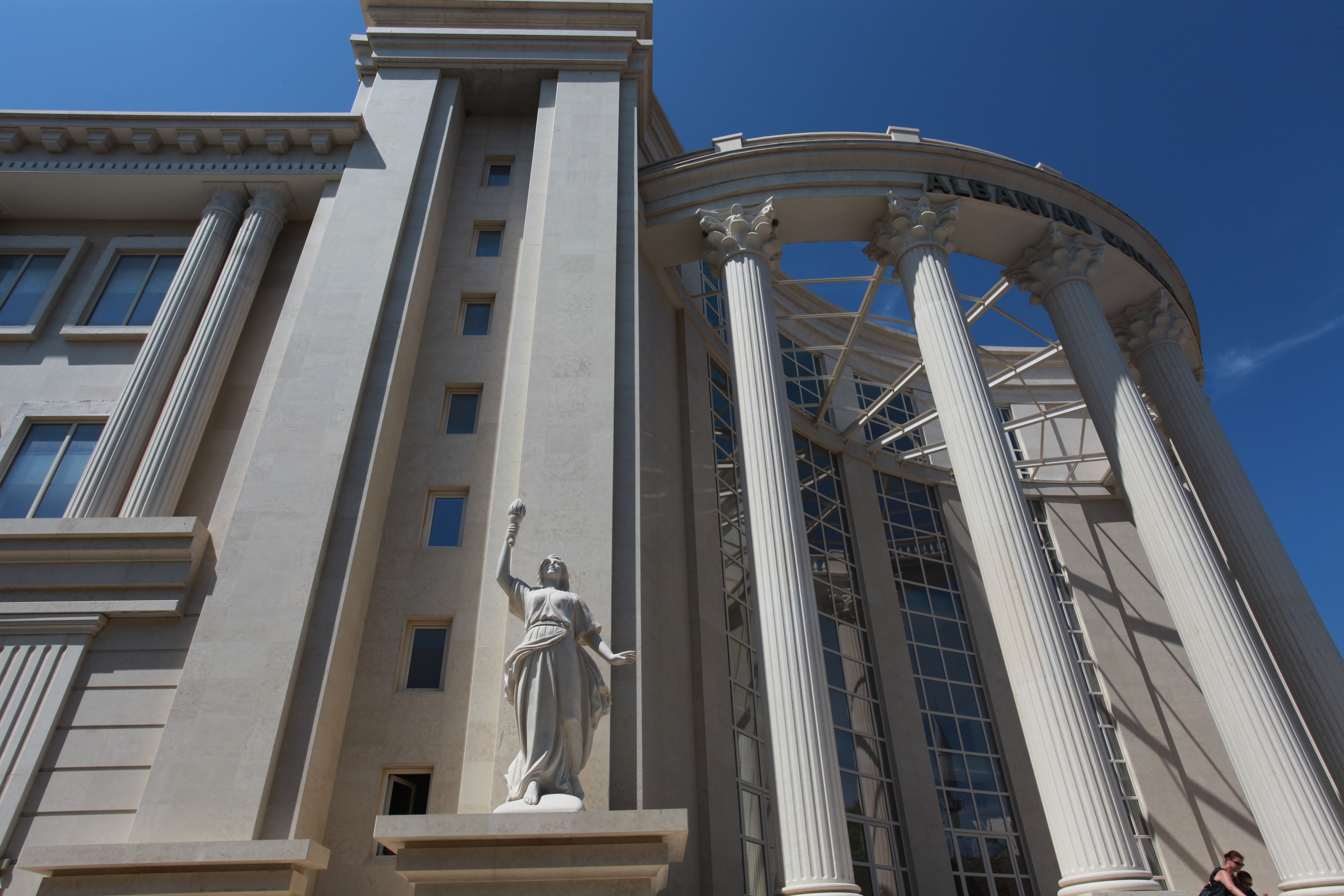
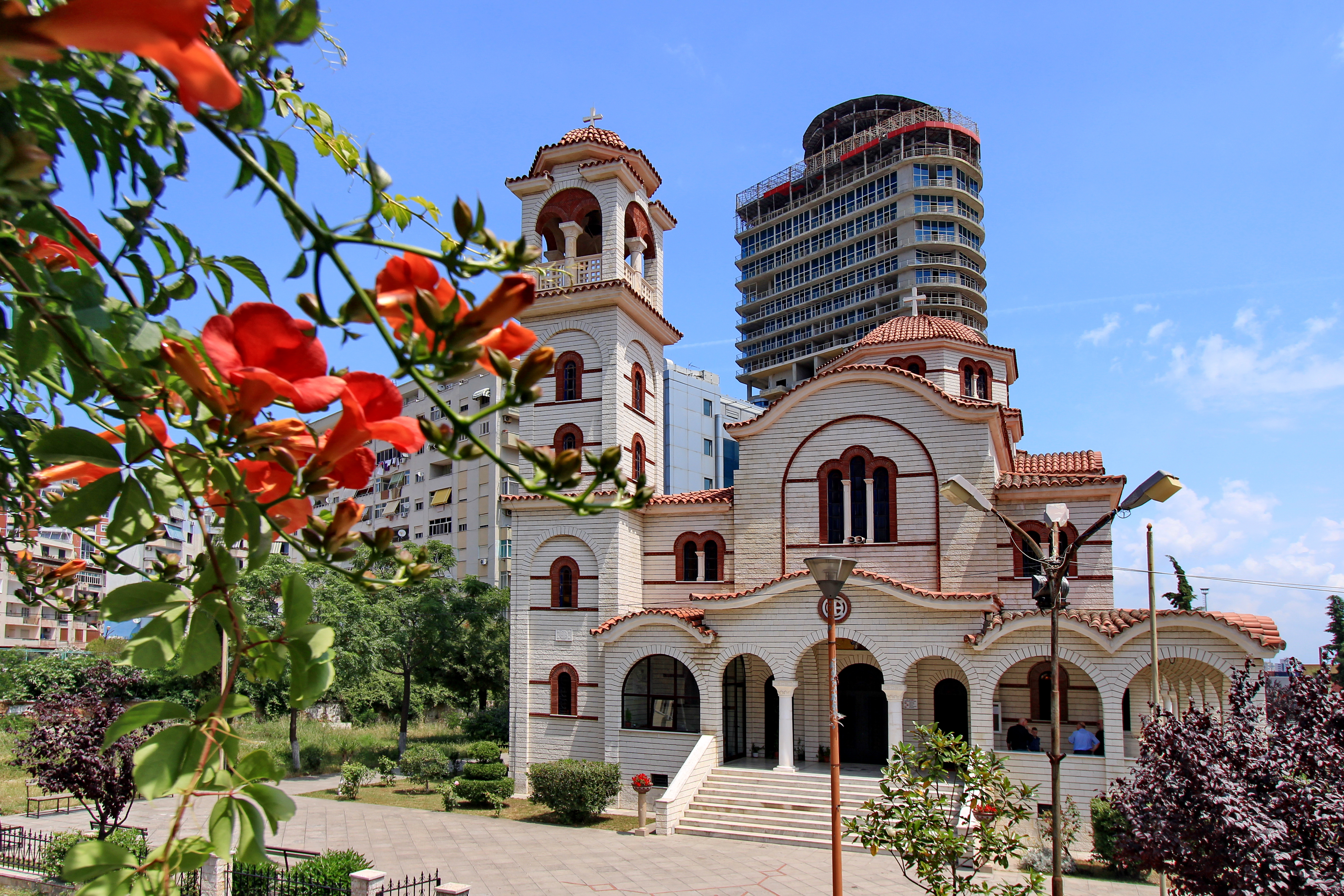
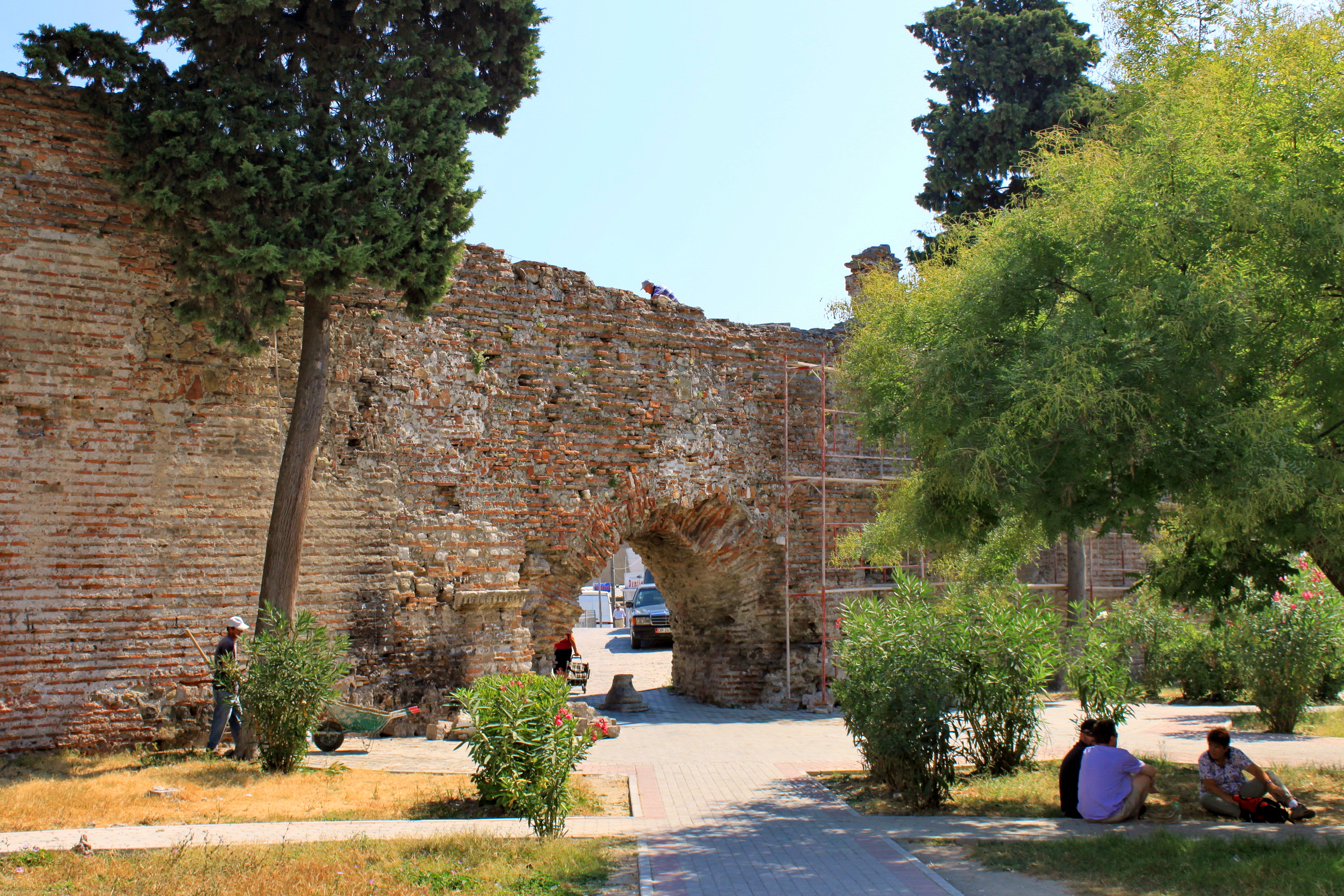
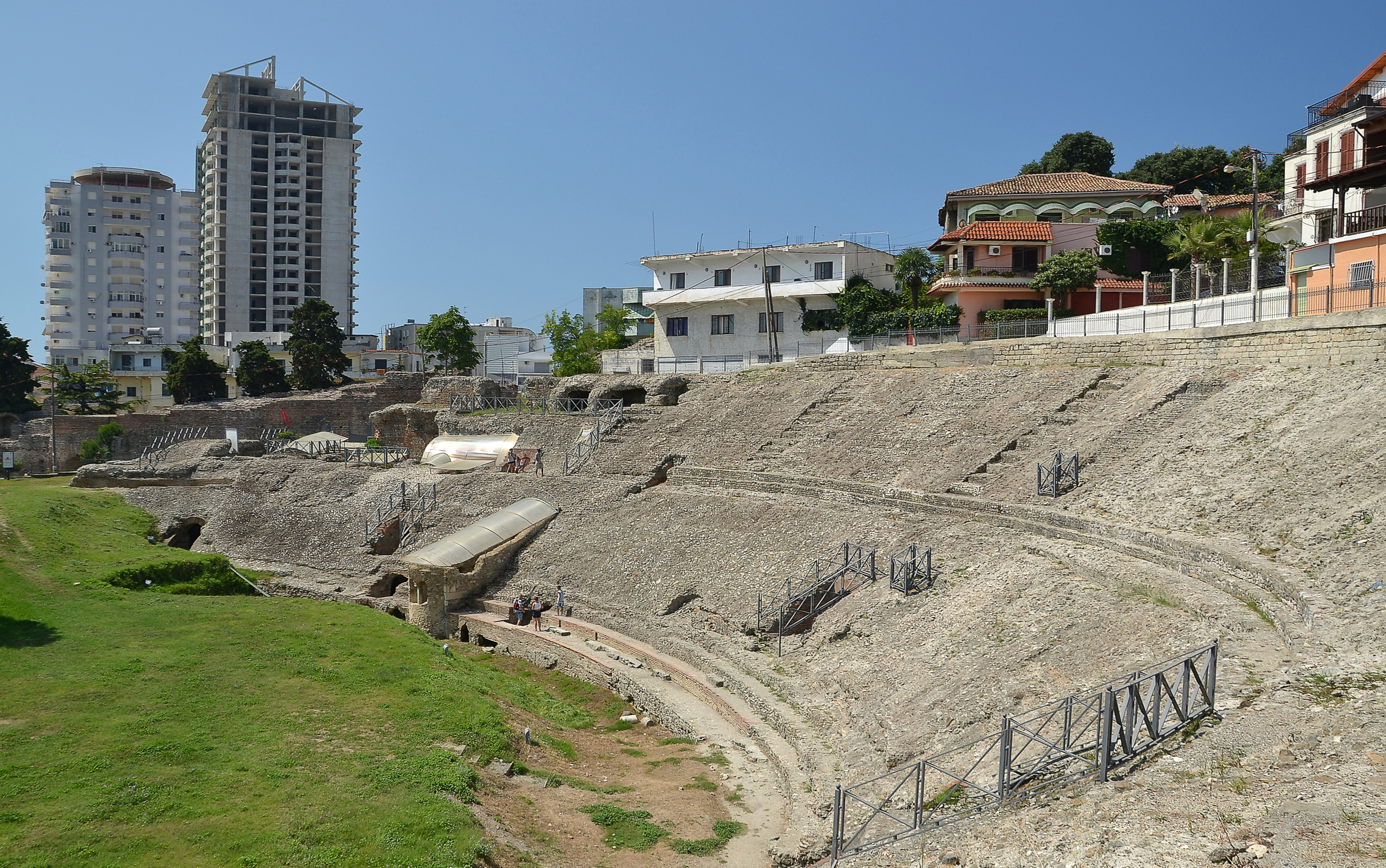
- Port of Durrës Mosaics at a Basilica within the Amphitheatre Venetian Tower Albanian College Church of Saint Asti and Apostle Paul Ancient walls Amphitheatre of Durrës

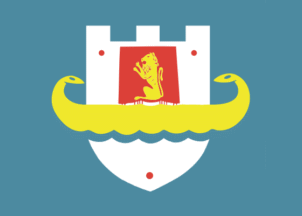
- Flag Seal

- Location of Durrës Durrës (Europe)
- Coordinates: 41°18′48″N 19°26′45″E
- Country: Albania
- Region: Northern Albania
- County: Durrës
- Founded: 7th century BC

Government
  - Type: Mayor–council
  - Body: Durrës Municipal Council
  - Mayor: Emiriana Sako (PS)

Area
  - Municipality: 338.30 km^{2} (130.62 sq mi)
  - Administrative unit: 39.81 km^{2} (15.37 sq mi)
- Elevation: 0 m (0 ft)

Population (2023)
  - Urban: 195,920
  - Metro: 265,330
  - Municipality: 153,614 (Note: The municipality of Durrës consists of the administrative units of Ishëm, Katund i Ri, Manëz, Rrashbull, Sukth and Durrës. The population of the municipality results from the sum of the listed administrative units in the former as of the 2011 Albanian census.)
  - Municipality density: 454/km^{2} (1,180/sq mi)
  - Administrative unit: 101,728
  - Administrative unit density: 2,555/km^{2} (6,620/sq mi)
- Demonym(s): Albanian: Durrsak (m), Durrsake (f)
- Time zone: UTC+01:00 (CET)
  - Summer (DST): UTC+02:00 (CEST)
- Postal code: 2000
- Area code: +355 (0) 52
- Seaport: Port of Durrës
- Vehicle registration: DR
- Website: durres.gov.al

Durrës (/ˈdʊrəs/ DUURR-əs, Albanian: [ˈdurəs]; Albanian definite form: Durrësi) is the second most populous city of the Republic of Albania and seat of Durrës County and Durrës Municipality. It is one of Albania's oldest continuously inhabited cities, with roughly 2,500 years of recorded history. It is located on a flat plain along the Albanian Adriatic Sea Coast between the mouths of the Erzen and Ishëm at the southeastern corner of the Adriatic Sea. Durrës's climate is profoundly influenced by a seasonal Mediterranean climate.

Durrës was founded under the name of Epidamnos around the 7th century BC, by ancient Greek colonists from Corinth and Corcyra in cooperation with the Taulantii, a local Illyrian tribe. Also known as Dyrrachium, Durrës developed as it became an integral part of the Roman Empire and its successor the Byzantine Empire. The Via Egnatia started in the city and led east across the fields, lowlands and highlands of the Balkan Peninsula to Constantinople.

In the Middle Ages, Durrës was contested between Bulgarians, Venetians, local Albanian noble families, and the Ottoman Empire. The Ottomans ultimately prevailed, ruling the city for more than 400 years from 1501 until 1912. Following the Albanian Declaration of Independence, the city served as the capital of the Principality of Albania for a short period of time. Subsequently, it was annexed by the Kingdom of Italy in the interwar period and was occupied by Nazi Germany during World War II. Durrës experienced a strong expansion in its demography and economic activity under the People's Socialist Republic of Albania.

The transport connections, concentration of economic institutions and industrial tradition underlie Durrës's leading economic position in Albania. It is served by the Port of Durrës, one of the largest on the Adriatic Sea, which connects the city to other neighbouring countries. Its most considerable attraction is the Amphitheatre of Durrës that is included on the Albanian tentative list for designation as a UNESCO World Heritage Site. Once having a capacity for 20,000 people, it is the largest amphitheatre in the Balkan Peninsula.

== Name ==
In antiquity, the city was known as Epidamnos (Ἐπίδαμνος) and Dyrrhachion (Δυρράχιον) in classical Greek and then Epidamnus and Dyrrachium in classical Latin. Epidamnos is the older known of the two toponyms; it is widely considered to be of Illyrian origin, as first proposed by linguist Hans Krahe, and is attested in Thucydides (5th century BC), Aristotle (4th century BC), and Polybius (2nd century BC). Etymologically, Epidamnos may be related to Proto-Albanian *dami (cub, young animal, young bull) > dem (modern Albanian) as proposed by linguist Eqrem Çabej. Although the name Epidamnos/Epidamnus was more commonly used among Ancient Greek authors, the coinage of the city only used the abbreviations for the name Dyrrhachion/Dyrrhachium. Dyrrachium was chosen as the sole name of the city after the Roman Republic gained control of the region after the Illyrian Wars in 229 BC. The Latin spelling of /y/ retained the form of Doric Greek Dyrrhachion, which was pronounced as /Durrakhion/. This change of the name is already attested in classical literature. Titus Livius, at the end of the first century BC, writes in Ab Urbe Condita Libri that at the time of the Illyrian Wars (roughly 200 years earlier), the city was not known as Dyrrachium, but as Epidamnus. Pomponius Mela, about 70 years later than Titus Livius, attributed the change of the name to the fact that the name Epidamnos reminded the Romans of the Latin word damnum, which signified evil and bad luck; Pliny the Elder, who lived in the same period, repeated this explanation in his works. However, the Romans may have adopted the new name because it was already in more frequent use by citizens of the city.

The name Dyrrhachion is usually explained as a Greek compound from δυσ- 'bad' and ῥαχία 'rocky shore, flood, roaring waves', an explanation already hinted at in antiquity by Cassius Dio, who writes it referred to the difficulties of the rocky coastline, while also reporting that other Roman authors linked it to the name of an eponymous hero Dyrrachius. The mythological construction of the city's name was recorded by Appian (2nd century AD), who wrote that "the king of the barbarians of this country, Epidamnus, gave the name to the city. His daughter's son Dyrrachius, built a port near the town that he called Dyrrachium". Stephanus of Byzantium repeated this mythological construction in his work. It is unclear whether the two toponyms referred originally to different areas of the territory of the city or whether they referred to the same territory. Classical literature indicates that they more probably referred to different neighbouring areas originally. Gradually, the name Epidamnus fell out of use, and Dyrrachium became the sole name for the city. Archaeological research has shown that at the time of the foundation of Durrës, two distinct settlements existed on its territory. The first one is a hill site with no direct contact with the sea. It predates the colony and might represent the settlement that held the toponym known as Epidamnos in ancient literature. The hill site overlooks to its south the second site, which is the territory of the port of Durrës, where the colony was founded. Its location on a rocky shore struck by waves on all sides reflects the description of the toponym Dyrrhachion. The distinction between these two districts of the city remained in place even much later. In the 19th century, Durrës proper was the district of the port, while the hill north of it was a separate settlement, Stani (Kodra e Stanit).

The modern names of the city in Albanian (Durrës) and Italian (Durazzo, Italian pronunciation: [duˈrattso]) are derived from Dyrrachium/Dyrrachion. An intermediate, palatalized antecedent is found in the form Dyrratio, attested in the early centuries AD. The palatalized /-tio/ ending probably represents a phonetic change in the way the inhabitants of the city pronounced its name. The preservation of old Doric /u/ indicates that the modern name derives from populations to whom the toponym was known in its original Doric pronunciation. By contrast, in Byzantine Greek, the name of the city is pronounced with the much later evolution of /u/ as /i/. The modern Italian name evolved in the sub-dialects that emerged from Colloquial Latin in northern Italy. The modern Albanian name evolved independently from the parent language of Albanian around the same period of the post-Roman era in the first centuries AD, as the difference in stress in the two toponyms (first syllable in Albanian, second in Italian) highlights. In Aromanian, the city is known as Durus. During the 411-year Ottoman period, Durrës was known in Ottoman Turkish as Dırac (دراج); with final consonant devoicing, the name has evolved into modern Turkish as Dıraç. In Venetian, it is called Durazo, while in the South Slavic languages, the city is known as Drač (Cyrillic Драч).

In English usage, the Italian form Durazzo used to be widespread, but the local Albanian name Durrës has gradually replaced it in recent decades.

== History ==
=== Earliest period ===
The territory of Durrës was populated at least starting from the Eneolithic and then, from protohistoric times, it was inhabited by Illyrian peoples.

=== Antiquity ===
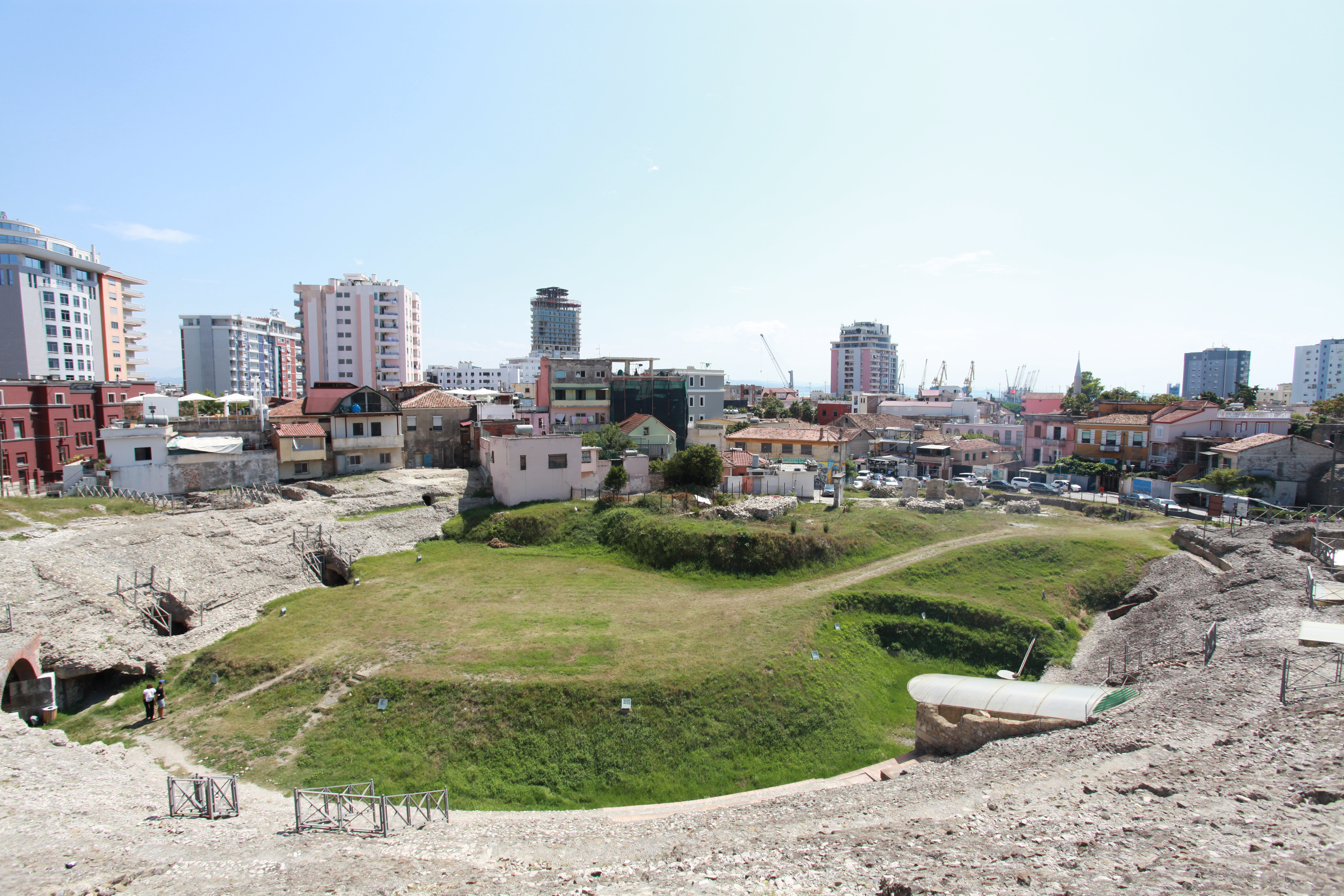
The Roman amphitheatre of Durrës, built in the 2nd century AD

Though surviving remains are minimal, Durrës is one of the oldest cities in Albania. In terms of mythology, the genealogy of the foundation of Dyrrhachium includes among the founders Illyrian men (the Illyrian king Epidamnos and his grandson Dyrrachos), Greek men (the Corinthian Falio, descendant of Heracles), heroes (Heracles who was given part of the lands) and gods (Poseidon, as father of Dyrrachos).

Several ancient people held the site: the presence of the Brygi appears to be confirmed by several ancient writers, the Illyrian Taulantii (their arrival has been estimated to have happened not later than the 10th century BC), probably the Liburni who expanded southwards in the 9th century BC. The city was founded by Greek colonists in 627 BC on the coast of the Taulantii. According to ancient authors, the Greek colonists helped the Taulantii to expel Liburnians and mixed with the local population establishing the Greek element to the port. A flourishing commercial centre emerged and the city grew rapidly. The fact that about the 6th century BC the citizens of Epidamnus constructed a Doric-style treasury at Olympia confirms that the city was among the richest of the Ancient Greek world. An ancient account describes Epidamnos as 'a great power and very populated' city.

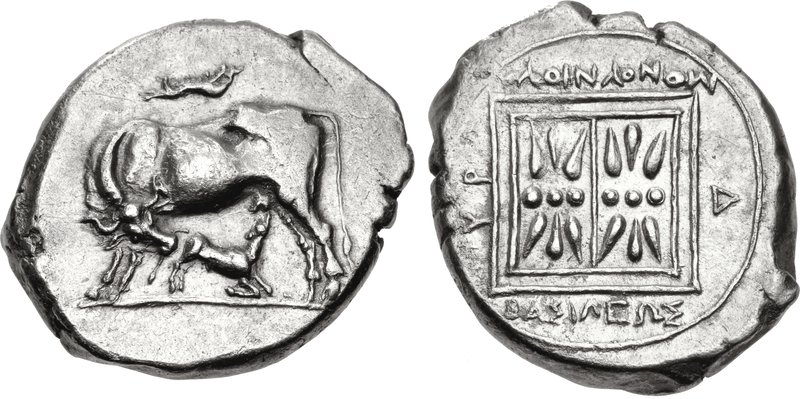
Silver stater of the Illyrian king Monunius, c. 280 BC from the Dyrrhachion mint. Cow and suckling calf, rev. double stellate pattern, inscription: ΒΑΣΙΛΕΩΣ ΜΟΝΟΥΝΙΟΥ and the city symbol ΔΥΡ.

After 323 BC Epidamnus-Dyrrhachium was involved in the intervention in Illyria of the Macedonians under Cassander, who clashed with the Illyrians under Glaukias. In 314 BC the Macedonian king seized the city but the garrison he established there was in turn besieged and driven out by the Illyrian king and the Corcyrans. In 312 BC, after another unsuccessful attack of Cassander in the region, the city came under the protection of Glaukias. Those events marked the end of Macedonian presence on the Adriatic coast for almost one century. The city probably came under the control of Pyrrhus of Epirus at the beginning of the 3rd century BC. From about 280 BC the Illyrian king Monunius, and his successor Mytilos minted in Dyrrhachion silver and bronze coins respectively, bearing the king's name and the symbol of the city. The fact that their coins were struck in the city mint of Dyrrhachion stresses that they exercised to some extent their authority over the city.

Epidamnus came under the control of the Illyrian Ardiaei under Agron, who fortified the city (c. 250–231 BC). When the Romans defeated the Illyrians, they replaced the rule of queen Teuta with that of Demetrius of Pharos, one of her generals. He lost his kingdom, including Epidamnus, to the Romans in 219 BC at the Second Illyrian War. In the Third Illyrian War Epidamnus was attacked by Gentius but he was defeated by the Romans at the same year.

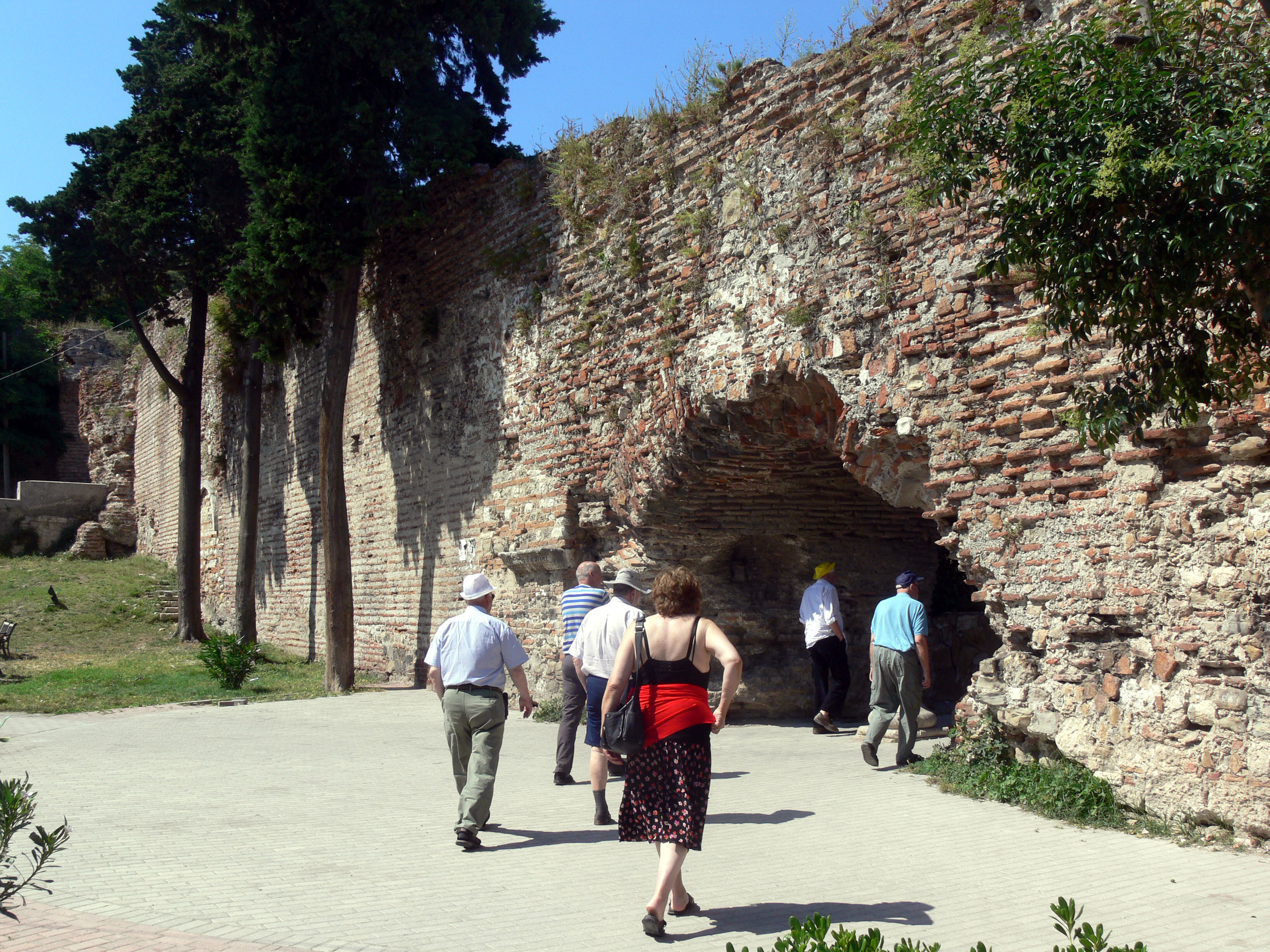
Entrance in the ancient walls of Durrës

For Catullus, the city was Durrachium Hadriae tabernam, "the taberna of the Adriatic", one of the stopping places for a Roman traveling up the Adriatic, as Catullus had done himself in the sailing season of 56.

After the Illyrian Wars with the Roman Republic in 229 BC ended in a decisive defeat for the Illyrians, the city passed to Roman rule, under which it was developed as a major military and naval base. The Romans preferred to use the name Dyrrachium (Greek: Δυρράχιον / Dyrrhachion) for the city. They considered the name Epidamnos to be inauspicious because of its wholly coincidental similarities with the Latin word damnum, meaning "loss" or "harm". The meaning of Dyrrachium ("bad spine" or "difficult ridge" in Greek) is unclear, but it has been suggested that it refers to the imposing cliffs near the city. During the Great Roman Civil War in Illyria, the Battle of Dyrrachium was undertaken by Julius Caesar against Gnaeus Pompey. The battle was a victory for Pompey, but it preceded the more decisive Battle of Pharsalus in Greece where Caesar won. Under Roman rule, Dyrrachium prospered; it became the western end of the Via Egnatia, the great Roman road that led to Thessalonica and on to Constantinople. Another lesser road led south to the city of Buthrotum, the modern Butrint. The Roman emperor Caesar Augustus made the city a colony for veterans of his legions following the Battle of Actium, proclaiming it a civitas libera (free town).

In the 4th century, Dyrrachium was made the capital of the Roman province of Epirus nova. It was the birthplace of the emperor Anastasius I in c. 430. Sometime later that century, Dyrrachium was struck by a powerful earthquake which destroyed the city's defences. Anastasius I rebuilt and strengthened the city walls, thus creating the strongest fortifications in the western Balkans. The 12-metre-high (39-foot) walls were so thick that, according to the Byzantine historian Anna Komnene, four horsemen could ride abreast on them. Significant portions of the ancient city defences still remain, although they have been much reduced over the centuries.

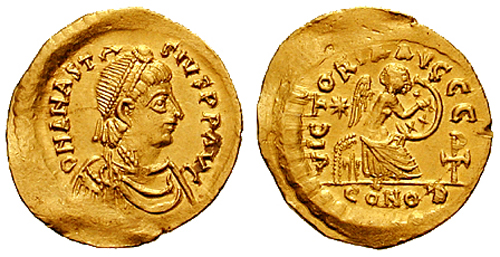
The Eastern Roman Emperor Anastasius I was born into an Illyrian family in Durrës.

Like much of the rest of the Balkans, Dyrrachium and the surrounding Dyrraciensis provinciae suffered considerably from barbarian incursions during the Migrations Period. It was besieged in 481 by Theodoric the Great, king of the Ostrogoths, and in subsequent centuries had to fend off frequent attacks by the Bulgarians. Unaffected by the fall of the Western Roman Empire, the city continued under the Byzantine Empire as an important port and a major link between the Empire and western Europe. During the sixth century based on accounts of Procopius, the territory south of the city was mainly inhabited by a Greek population.

=== Middle Ages ===
The city and the surrounding coast became a Byzantine province, the Theme of Dyrrhachium, probably in the first decade of the 9th century. Durrës became a Christian city quite early on; its bishopric was created around 58 and was raised to the status of an archbishopric in 449. It was also the seat of an Orthodox metropolitan bishop. The city remained in Byzantine hands until the late 10th century, when control passed to Samuel of Bulgaria, possibly through his marriage with Agatha, daughter of the local magnate John Chryselios. Samuel made his son-in-law Ashot Taronites, a Byzantine captive who had married his daughter Miroslava, governor of Durrës. In circa 1005, however, Ashot and Miroslava, with the connivance of Chryselios, fled to Constantinople, where they notified Emperor Basil II of their intention to surrender the city to him. Soon a Byzantine squadron under Eustathios Daphnomeles arrived at Durrës, and the city returned to Byzantine rule.

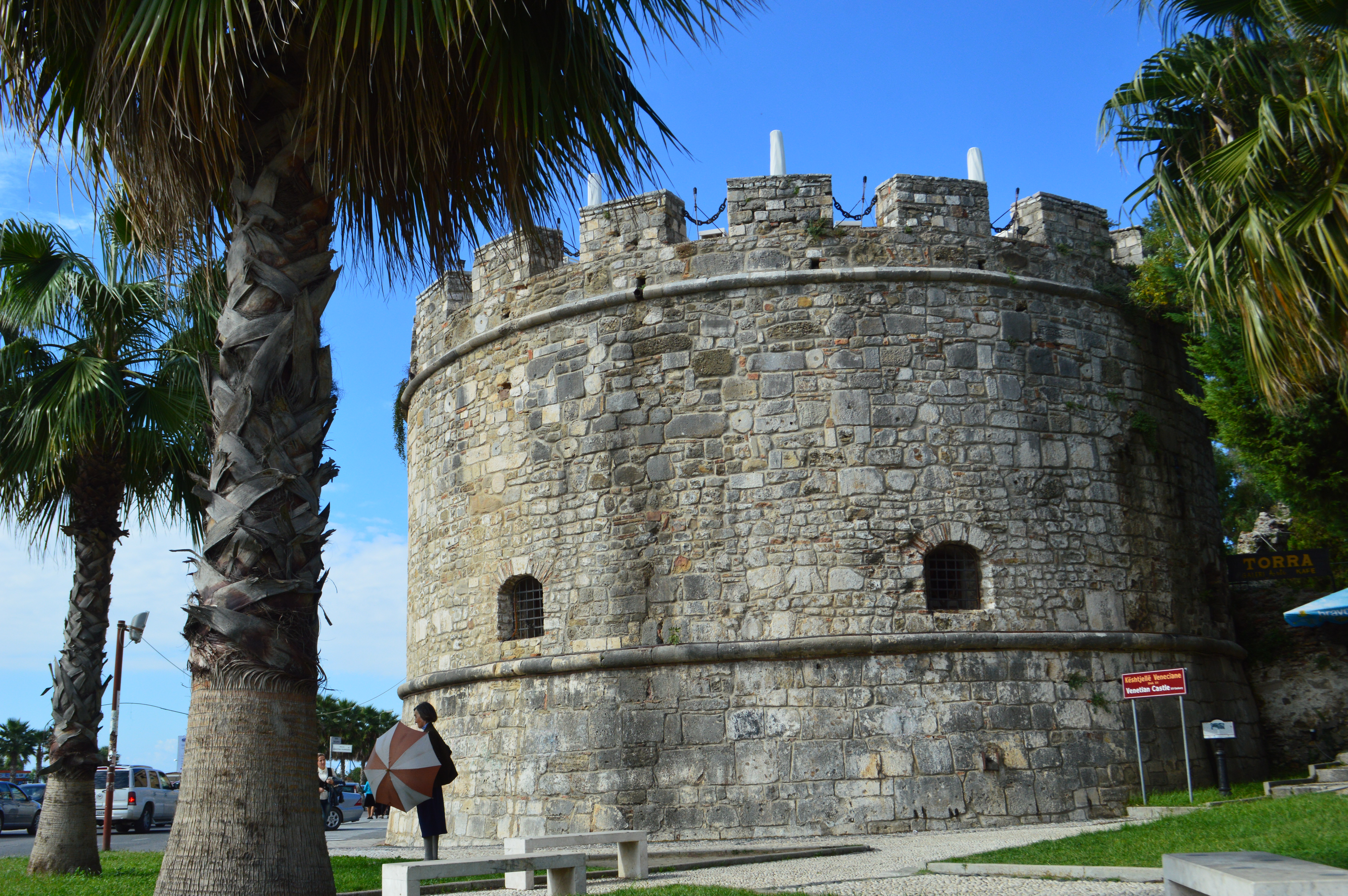
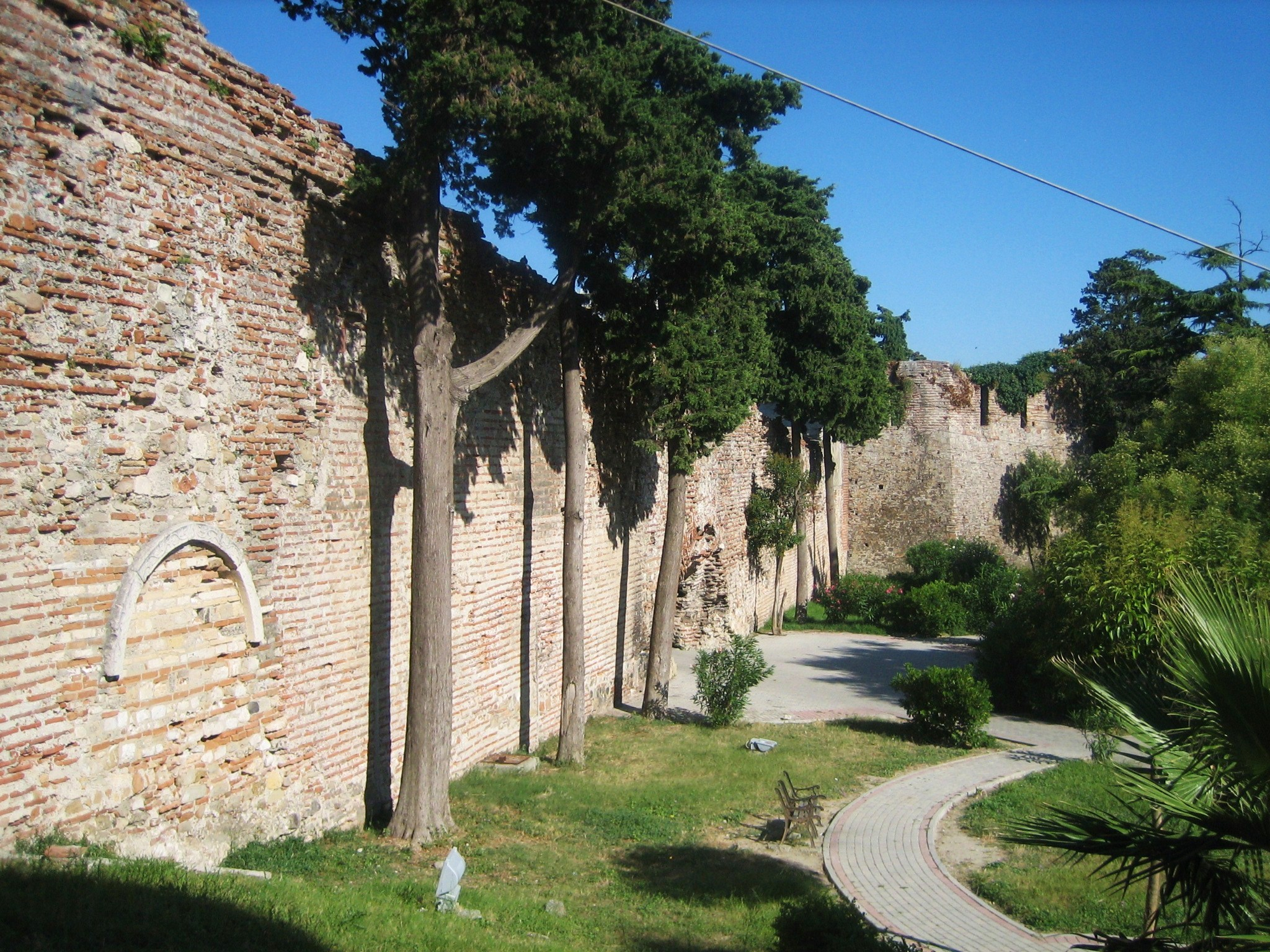
Durrës Castle was built by the Byzantine Emperor Anastasius I 491–518 CE, making the city one of the most fortified on the Adriatic. The walls were devastated by an earthquake in 1273 and were extensively repaired.

In the 11th–12th centuries, the city was important as a military stronghold and a metropolitan see rather than as a major economic center, and never recovered its late antique prosperity; Anna Komnene makes clear that medieval Dyrrhachium occupied only a portion of the ancient city. In the 1070s, two of its governors, Nikephoros Bryennios the Elder and Nikephoros Basilakes, led unsuccessful rebellions trying to seize the Byzantine throne. Dyrrachium was lost in February 1082 when Alexios I Komnenos was defeated by the Normans under Robert Guiscard and his son Bohemund in the Battle of Dyrrhachium. Byzantine control was restored a few years later, but the Normans under Bohemund returned to besiege it in 1107–08, and sacked it again in 1185 under King William II of Sicily.

In 1205, after the Fourth Crusade, the city was transferred to the rule of the Republic of Venice, which formed the "Duchy of Durazzo". This Duchy was conquered in 1213 and the city taken by the Despotate of Epirus under Michael I Komnenos Doukas. In 1257, Durrës was occupied by the King of Sicily, Manfred of Hohenstaufen. Manfred's rule lasted until his death at the Battle of Benevento in 1267. After his death, the city was given to Charles d' Anjou (Charles I of Sicily). In c. 1273, it was wrecked by a devastating earthquake (according to George Pachymeres) but soon recovered. It was briefly occupied by King Milutin of Serbia in 1296. In the thirteenth century, a Jewish community existed in Durrës and was employed in the salt trade.

In the early 14th century, the city was ruled by a coalition of Anjous, Hungarians, and Albanians of the Thopia family. In 1317 or 1318, the area was taken by the Serbs and remained under their rule until the 1350s. At that time the Popes, supported by the Anjous, increased their diplomatic and political activity in the area, by using the Latin bishops, including the archbishop of Durrës. The city had been a religious center of Catholicism after the Anjou were installed in Durrës. In 1272, a Catholic archbishop was installed, and until the mid-14th century there were both Catholic and Orthodox archbishops of Durrës.

Two Irish pilgrims who visited Albania on their way to Jerusalem in 1322, reported that Durrës was "inhabited by Latins, Greeks, perfidious Jews and barbaric Albanians".

In 1380, the Venetians had established the theological University of Dyrrhachium in Durrës, which was later transferred to Zadar in 1396 after Ottoman threats of invasion began in the Balkans.

When the Serbian Tsar Dušan died in 1355, the city passed into the hands of the Albanian family of Thopias. In 1376 the Navarrese Company under Louis of Évreux, Duke of Durazzo, who had gained the rights on the Kingdom of Albania from his second wife, attacked and conquered the city, but in 1383 Karl Topia regained control of the city. The Republic of Venice regained control in 1392 from Gjergj Thopia and retained the city, known as Durazzo in those years, as part of the Albania Veneta. It fended off a siege by the Ottoman Sultan Mehmed II in 1466 but fell to Ottoman forces in 1501.

=== Ottoman period (to 1912) ===
Under Ottoman rule, many of its inhabitants converted to Islam and many mosques were erected. The city was renamed Dırac (دراج) but did not prosper in the first two centuries of the Ottoman era; its importance declined greatly and it became a den of piracy. Following the establishment of Ottoman rule in 1501, the Durrës Jewish community experienced population growth.

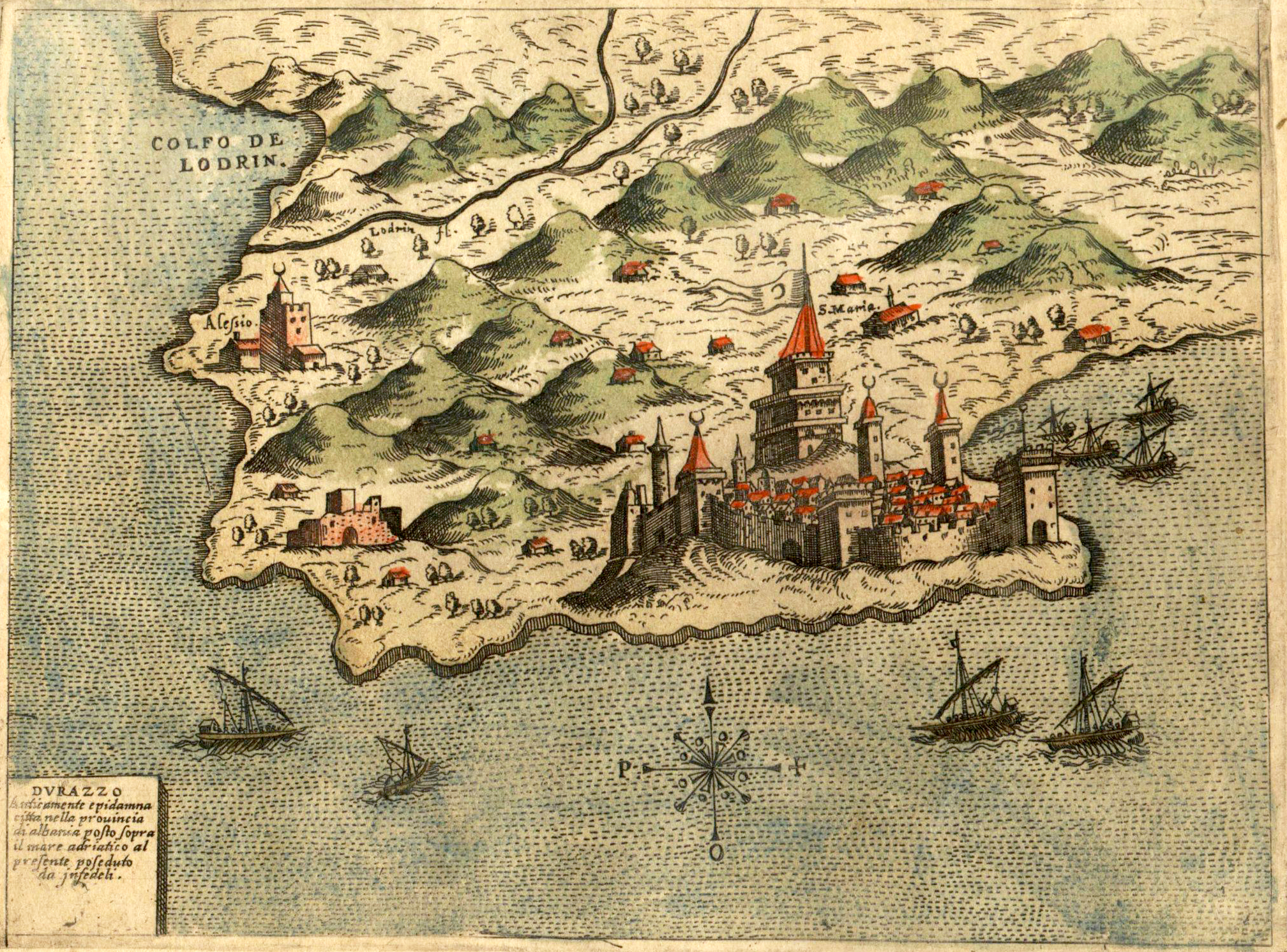
The city of Durrës in 1573

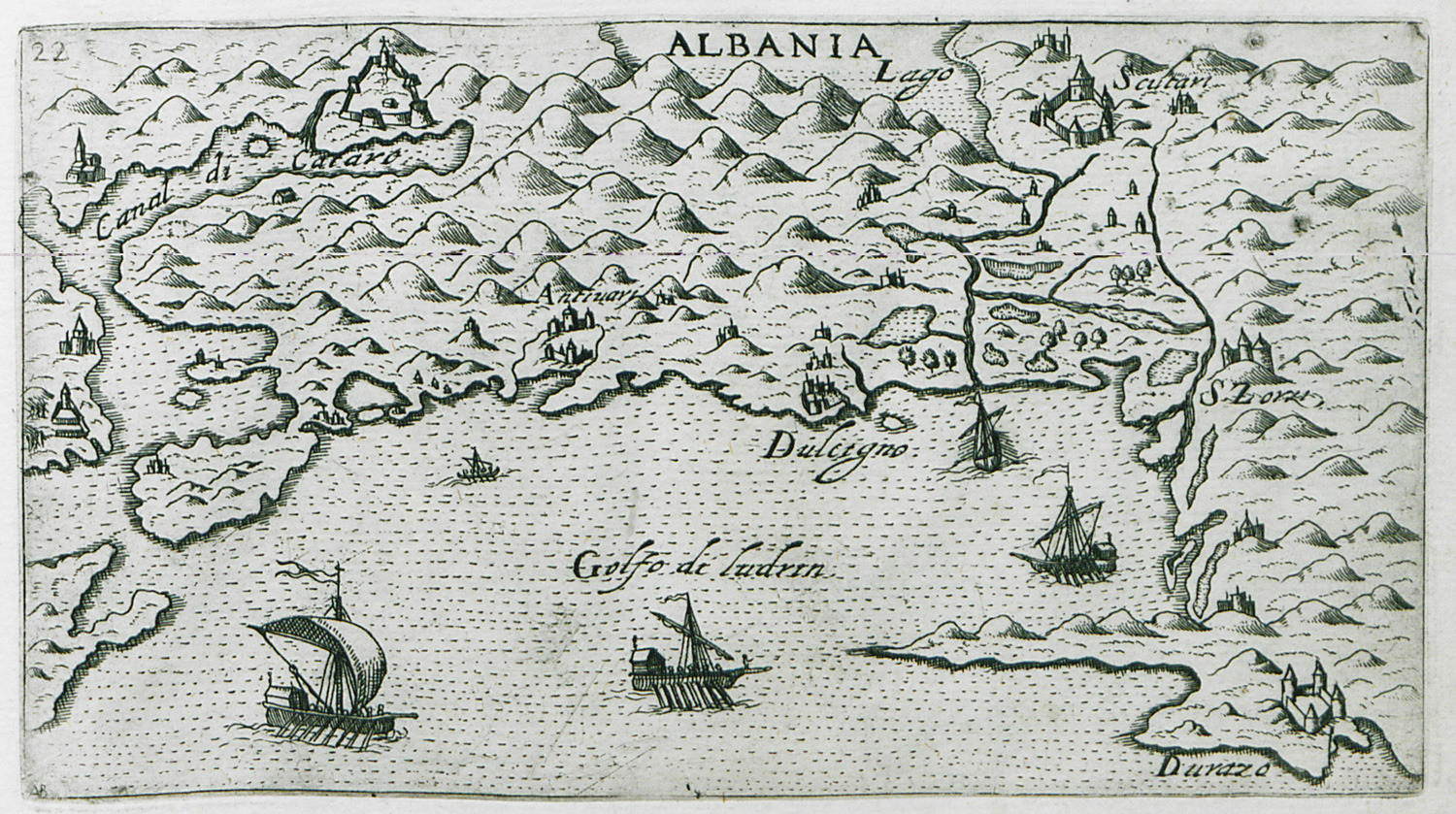
Map of the coast in northern Durrës from Giuseppe Rosaccio in 1598

As a port, Durrës was of little importance to the Ottomans, who controlled the entire Albanian coast. The town's main significance rather lay in its strategic castle, which the Turks reinforced and improved upon, and its rich salt deposits. There were few permanent civilian settlements, and most of the population, including the local kadı, opted to live further inland, such as in the newly established town of Kavajë, 14 km south of Durrës. The Ottoman chronicler Evliya Çelebi visited Durrës in 1670-71 and noted in his Seyahatname that there were around 150 houses as well as a mosque named after Sultan Bayezid II.

The city's economy began to recover from the late 17th century onwards, boosted by profits from the salt mines, which exported salt throughout the Balkan hinterland. According to diplomat and Turkologist François Pouqueville, about 100 Turkish and Greek merchants lived in the city in 1699, exporting 3,000 quintals (300 tons) of beeswax, 15,000 quintals (1,500 tons) of finished cloth, 15,000 pieces of fine leather, and 60-100 ships of wheat, barley, corn and millet to Venice every year despite an official prohibition from the central government in Constantinople. France, England, the Netherlands, and Austria established their consulates in Durrës in 1700.

As Ottoman relations with Venice improved upon the conclusion of the Ottoman-Venetian Wars, Durrës became a focal point of trade with the Republic of Venice, especially in grains and olive oil, as reported by the Venetian consul in the city in 1769. Mercantile relations with Venice were halted when the latter city was occupied by Napoleonic forces in 1797, bringing an end to the maritime republic. The Austrian Empire and later Austria-Hungary, via the port of Trieste, then replaced Venice as Durrës's largest trading partner. According to contemporary statistician Friedrich Wilhelm von Reden, total exports from Durrës reached 672,000 Austrian thalers each year, while imports amounted to 455,000 thalers.

By the mid-19th century, its population was said to have been about 1,000 people living in some 200 households. In the late nineteenth century, Durrës contained 1,200 Orthodox Aromanians (130 families) who lived among the larger population of Muslim Albanians alongside a significant number of Catholic Albanians. The decrepitude of Durrës was noted by foreign observers in the early 20th century, echoing comments made by the Ottoman cartographer Piri Reis almost 400 years before: "The walls are dilapidated; plane-trees grow on the gigantic ruins of its old Byzantine citadel; and its harbour, once equally commodious and safe, is gradually becoming silted up."

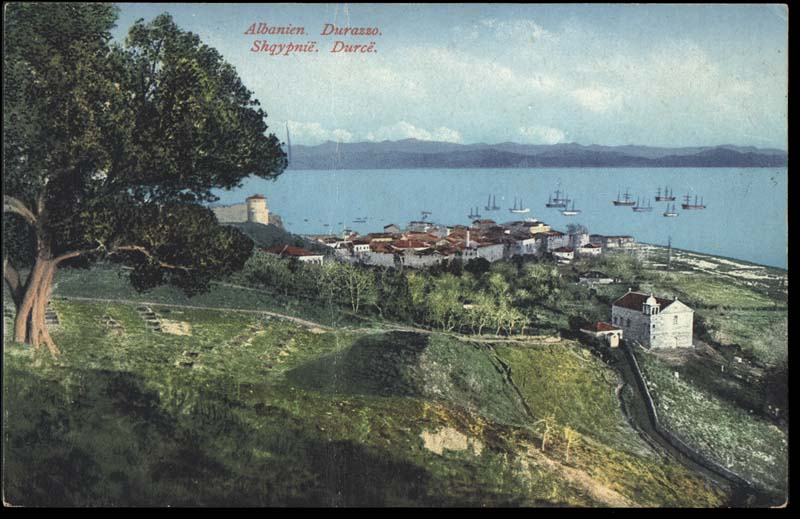
Turn-of-the-century Durrës, in the last decades of Ottoman rule

During the Tanzimat (reform) era, Durrës was separated from the Sanjak of Elbasan and became a main administrative centre in the reorganised İşkodra Vilayet before 1912; it had its own sanjak, namely the Sanjak of Durrës, which was established in 1880 within the vilayet. With the city's economic prosperity and upgrade in status, its demographic decline was also reversed. Many government buildings were built, as well as Western-style hotels and restaurants for private businesses. In 1892-1893 the population of the kaza of Durrës grew to about 4,781, consisting of 3,018 Muslims, 1,514 Orthodox, 201 Catholics, and 48 foreigners.

On 26 November 1912, as the Ottoman Empire was embroiled in the First Balkan War, a group of nationalists led by Ismail Qemali raised the Albanian flag over Durrës. Albania declared independence two days later, bringing four centuries of Turkish rule in Durrës to an end.

=== Modern ===
The city of Durrës in 1918

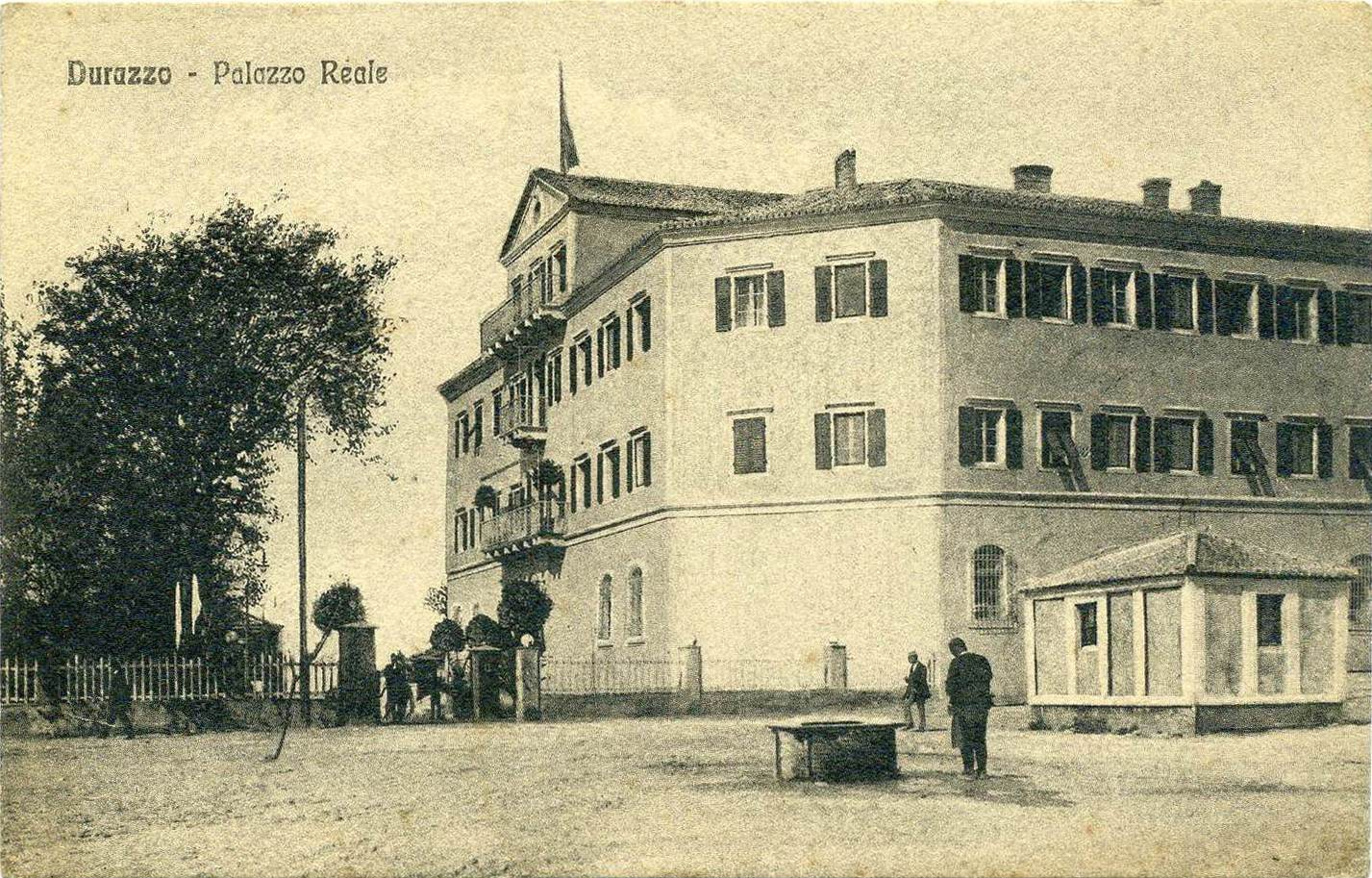
The Royal Palace of Durrës served as the residence of William, Prince of Albania and his wife Princess Sophie of Albania.

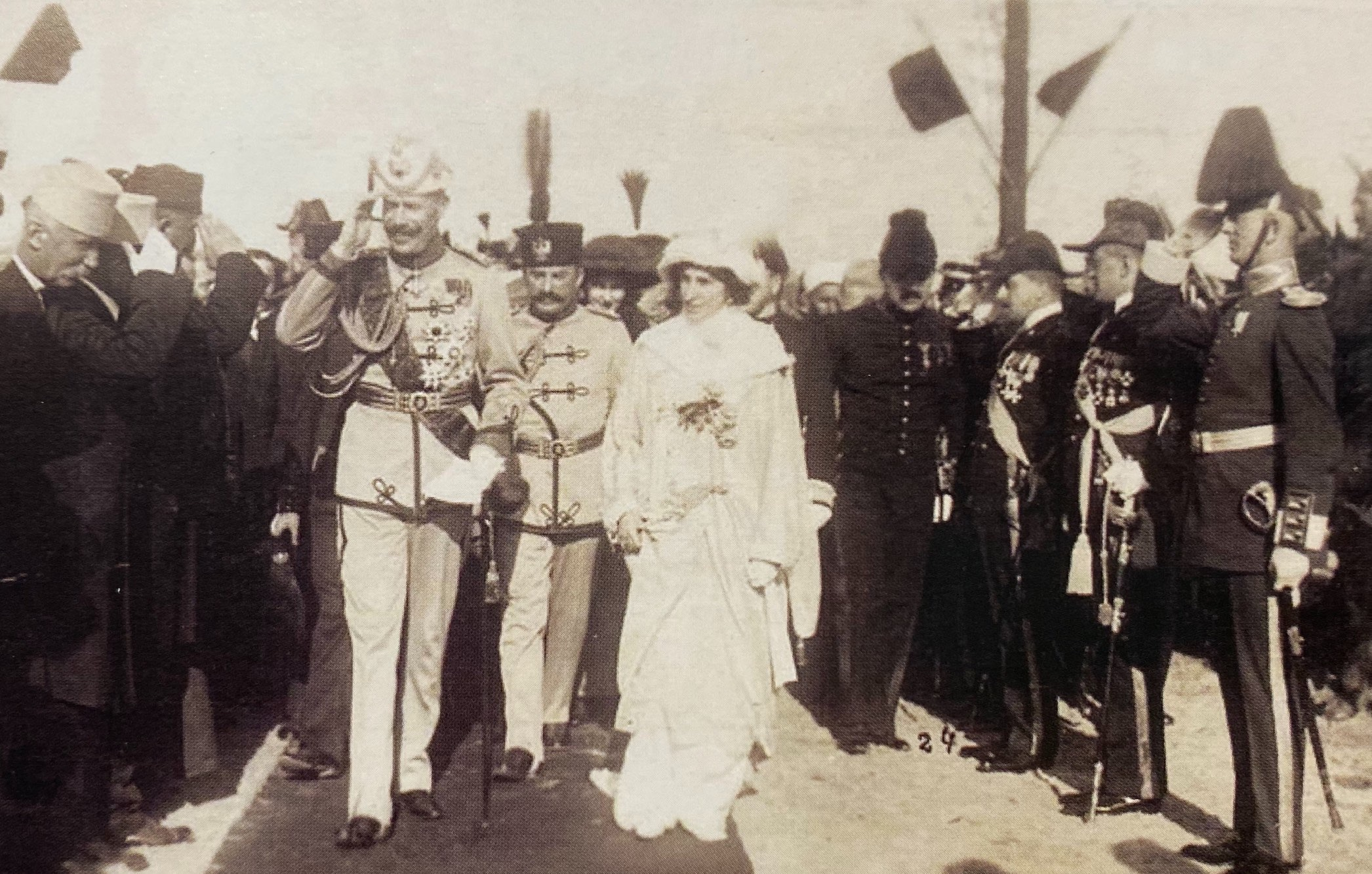
William, Prince of Albania and his wife Princess Sophie of Albania arriving in Durrës, then the capital of Albania, on 7 March 1914

Durrës was an active city in the Albanian national liberation movement in the periods 1878–1881 and 1910–1912. Ismail Qemali raised the Albanian flag on 26 November 1912 but the city was occupied by the Kingdom of Serbia three days later during the First Balkan War. On 29 November 1912 Durrës became the county town of the Durrës County one of the counties of the Kingdom of Serbia established on the part of the territory of Albania occupied from Ottoman Empire. The Durrës County had four districts: Durrës, Lezha, Elbasan and Tirana. The army of the Kingdom of Serbia retreated from Durrës in April 1913. The city became Albania's second national capital (after Vlorë) on 7 March 1914 under the brief rule of Prince Wilhelm, Prince of Albania. It remained Albania's capital until 11 February 1920, when the Congress of Lushnjë made Tirana the new capital.

During the First World War, the city was occupied by Italy in 1915 and by Austria-Hungary in 1916–1918. On 29 December 1915, a Naval Battle was fought off Durazzo. On 2 October 1918, several allied ships bombarded Durazzo and attacked the few Austrian ships in the harbour. Although civilians started to flee the city at the start of the bombardment, many casualties were inflicted on the innocent and neutral population. The Old City being adjacent to the harbour was largely destroyed, including the Royal Palace of Durrës and other primary public buildings. It was captured by Italian troops on 16 October 1918. Restored to Albanian sovereignty, Durrës became the country's temporary capital between 1918 and March 1920. It experienced an economic boom due to Italian investments and developed into a major seaport under the rule of King Zog, with a modern harbour being constructed in 1927. It was at this time the Royal Villa of Durrës was built by Zog as a summer palace, that still dominates the skyline from a hill close to the old city.

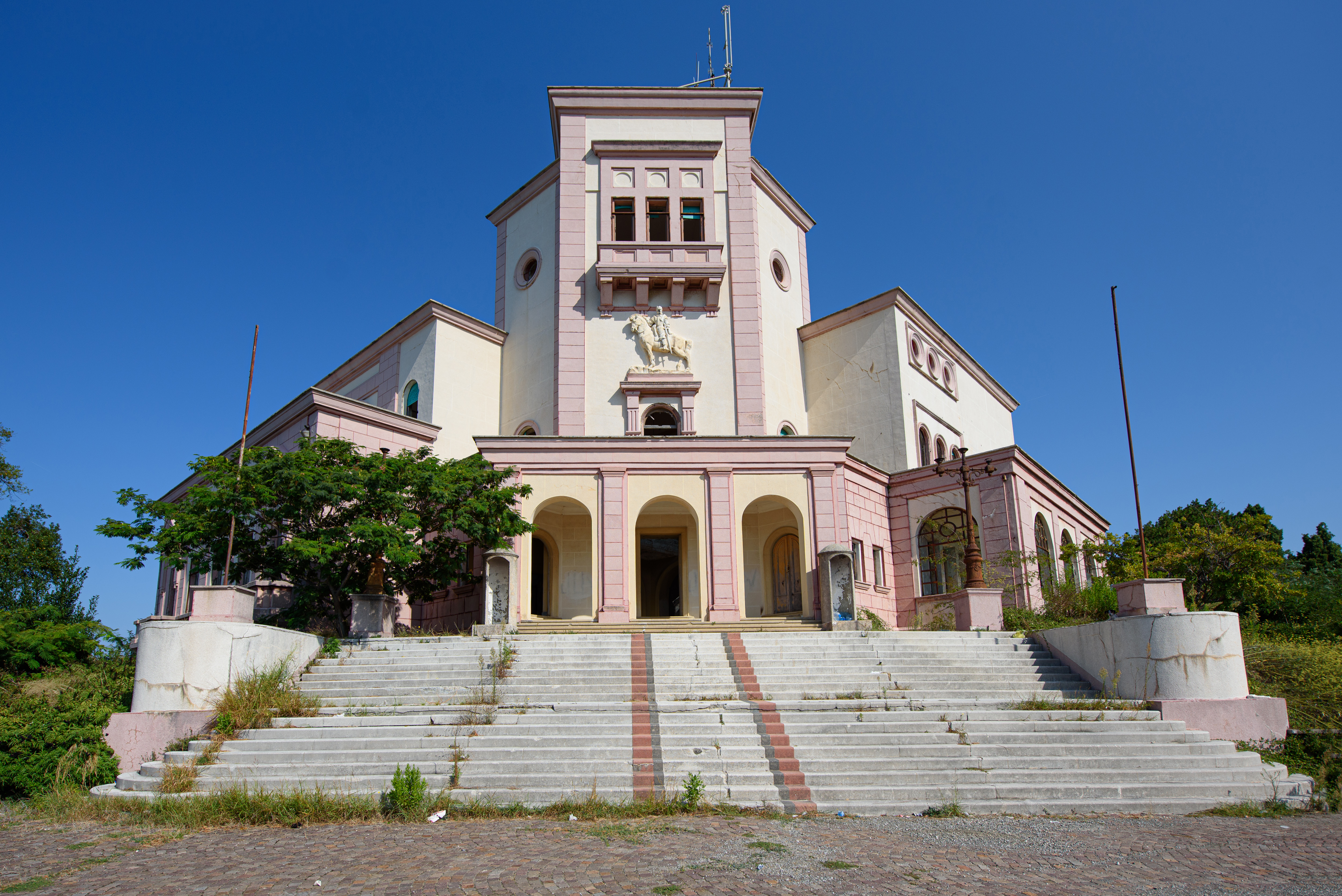
Royal villa in Durrës

An earthquake in 1926 damaged some of the city and the rebuilding that followed gave the city its more modern appearance. During the 1930s, the Bank of Athens had a branch in the city.

Durrës (called Durazzo again in Italian) and the rest of Albania were occupied in April 1939 and annexed to the Kingdom of Italy until 1943, then occupied by Nazi Germany until autumn 1944. Durrës's strategic value as a seaport made it a high-profile military target for both sides. It was the site of the initial Italian landings on 7 April 1939 (and was fiercely defended by Mujo Ulqinaku) as well as the launch point for the ill-fated Italian invasion of Greece. The city was heavily damaged by Allied bombing during the war and the port installations were blown up by retreating German soldiers in autumn 1944.

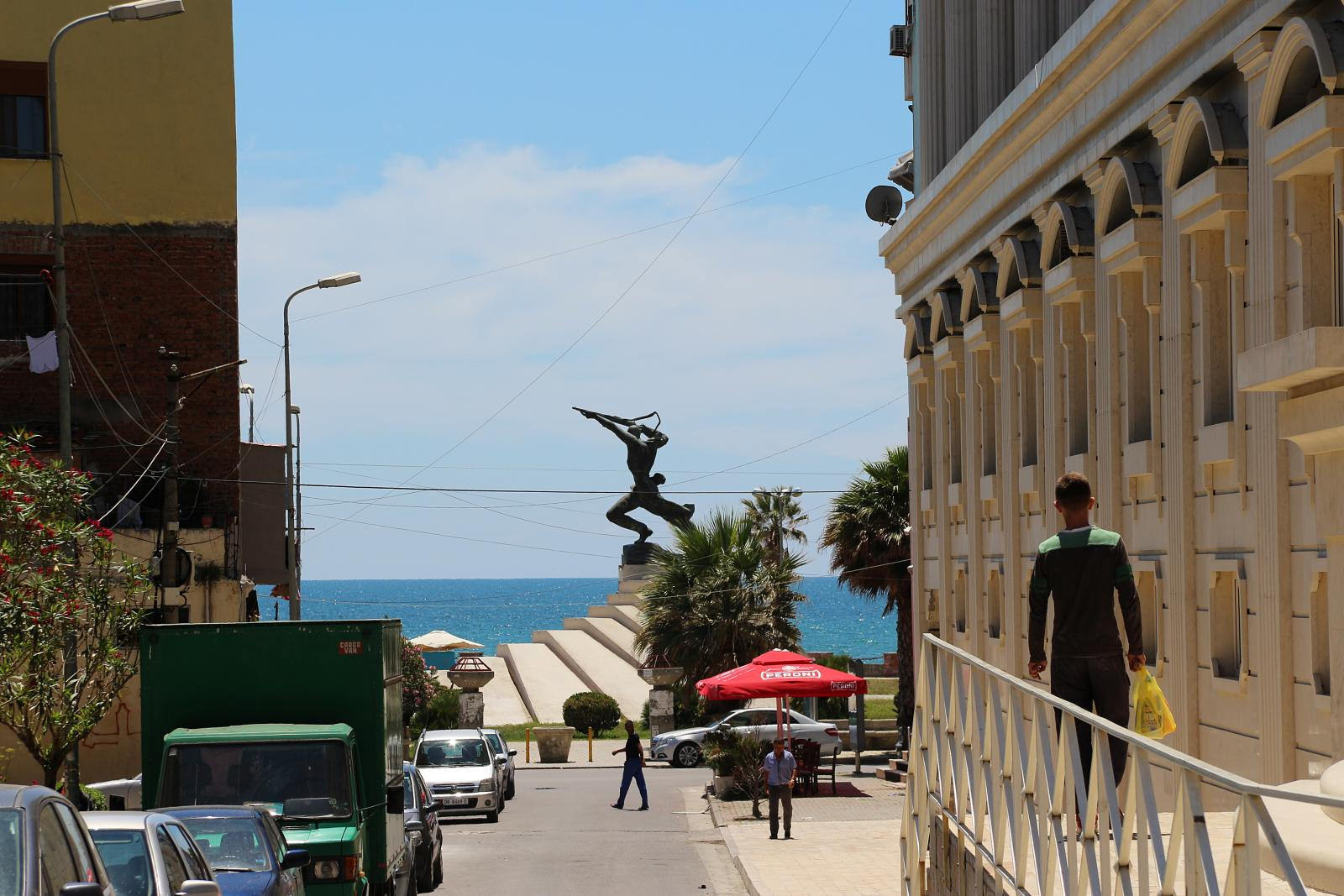
Street in Durrës

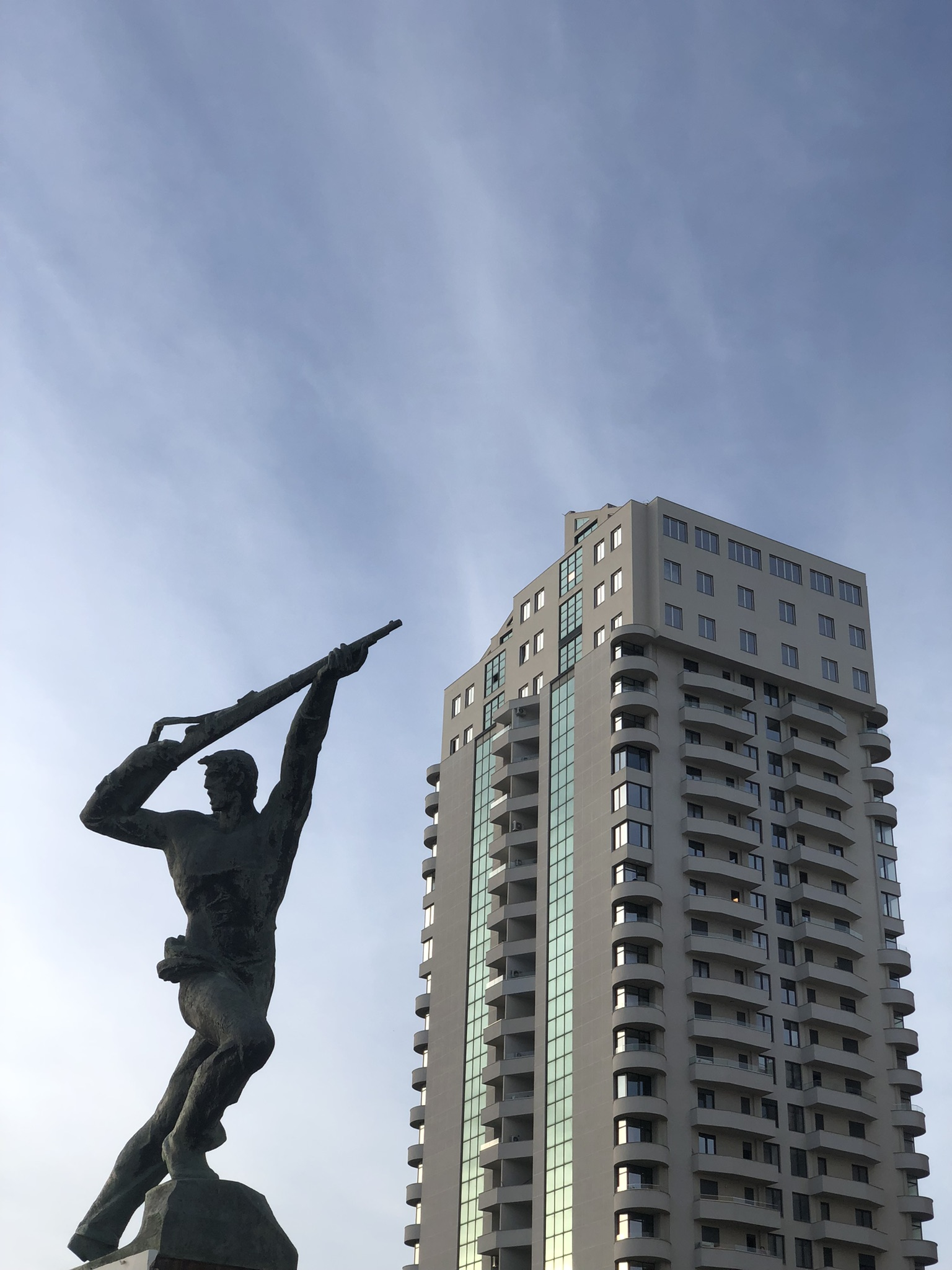
Socialist realist statue of unknown soldier with a high rise in the background

The Communist regime of Enver Hoxha rapidly rebuilt the city following the war, establishing a variety of heavy industries in the area and expanding the port. It became the terminus of Albania's first railway, begun in 1947 (Durrës–Tirana railway). In the late 1980s, the city was briefly renamed Durrës-Enver Hoxha. The city was and continues to remain the center of Albanian mass beach tourism.

Following the collapse of communist rule in 1990, Durrës became the focus of mass emigrations from Albania with ships being hijacked in the harbour and sailed at gunpoint to Italy. In one month alone, August 1991, over 20,000 people migrated to Italy in this fashion. Italy intervened militarily, putting the port area under its control, and the city became the center of the European Community's "Operation Pelican", a food-aid program.

In 1997, Albania slid into anarchy following the collapse of a massive pyramid scheme which devastated the national economy. An Italian-led peacekeeping force was controversially deployed to Durrës and other Albanian cities to restore order, although there were widespread suggestions that the real purpose of "Operation Alba" was to prevent economic refugees continuing to use Albania's ports as a route to migrate to Italy.

Following the start of the 21st century, Durrës has been revitalized as many streets were repaved, while parks and façades experienced a face lift.

== Geography ==
Durrës is located on the Bay of Durrës on a flat alluvial plain between the river mouths of Erzen and the Ishëm along the Adriatic Sea within the Mediterranean Sea. The municipality of Durrës is encompassed in the County of Durrës within the Northern Region of Albania and consists of the adjacent administrative units of Ishëm, Katund i Ri, Manëz, Rrashbull, Sukth and Durrës as its seat. It stretches from the mouth of Ishëm River at the Cape of Rodon in the north across the Bay of Lalzi to the Shkëmbi i Kavajës in the south.

=== Climate ===
According to the Köppen climate classification, Durrës is classified under the periphery of the hot-summer Mediterranean climate (Csa) zone with an average annual temperature of 15.9 °C (60.6 °F). Its climate is influenced by its proximity to the Adriatic Sea in the Mediterranean Sea and the hills in the Western Lowlands in the hinterlands. The summers are predominantly hot and dry, the winters relatively mild, and falls and springs mainly stable, in terms of precipitation and temperatures. The mean monthly temperature ranges between 7.5 °C (45.5 °F) in winter to 23.8 °C (74.8 °F) in summer. The highest temperature of 39 °C (102 °F) was recorded on 14 August 1957. The lowest temperature of −6.2 °C (20.8 °F) was registered on 26 January 1954. Durrës receives most of the precipitation in winter months and less in summer months. The mean annual precipitation ranges between 1,000 millimetres (39 inches) and 1,273 millimetres (50.1 inches).

Climate data for Durrës
Month	Jan	Feb	Mar	Apr	May	Jun	Jul	Aug	Sep	Oct	Nov	Dec	Year
Mean daily maximum °C (°F)	13.5 (56.3)	15.3 (59.5)	17.6 (63.7)	21.0 (69.8)	25.0 (77.0)	30.3 (86.5)	33.7 (92.7)	34.2 (93.6)	29.5 (85.1)	24.7 (76.5)	19.9 (67.8)	15.3 (59.5)	23.3 (74.0)
Daily mean °C (°F)	8.8 (47.8)	10.4 (50.7)	12.5 (54.5)	15.6 (60.1)	19.6 (67.3)	24.3 (75.7)	27.3 (81.1)	27.7 (81.9)	23.5 (74.3)	19.2 (66.6)	15.0 (59.0)	10.6 (51.1)	17.9 (64.2)
Mean daily minimum °C (°F)	4.2 (39.6)	5.6 (42.1)	7.4 (45.3)	10.2 (50.4)	14.2 (57.6)	18.3 (64.9)	21.0 (69.8)	21.1 (70.0)	17.6 (63.7)	13.7 (56.7)	10.1 (50.2)	6.0 (42.8)	12.4 (54.4)
Average precipitation mm (inches)	121.2 (4.77)	98.0 (3.86)	81.6 (3.21)	76.1 (3.00)	63.7 (2.51)	29.5 (1.16)	12.4 (0.49)	18.9 (0.74)	62.2 (2.45)	83.6 (3.29)	140.1 (5.52)	136.7 (5.38)	924 (36.38)
Average precipitation days (≥ 0.1 mm)	12.0	10.2	9.7	9.7	8.8	4.3	2.0	2.6	6.9	7.7	11.1	10.2	95.2
Average snowy days	0.2	0.5	0.1	0	0	0	0	0	0	0	0	0.1	0.9
Average relative humidity (%)	72	69	70	72	73	70	67	67	70	72	72	72	71
Average dew point °C (°F)	2 (36)	2 (36)	5 (41)	8 (46)	12 (54)	16 (61)	17 (63)	17 (63)	16 (61)	12 (54)	7 (45)	4 (39)	10 (50)
Mean monthly sunshine hours	133.3	135.6	173.6	207	279	318	375.1	325.5	261	217	147	124	2,696.1
Mean daily sunshine hours	4.3	4.8	5.6	6.9	9	10.6	12.1	10.5	8.7	7	4.9	4	7.4
Mean daily daylight hours	9.6	10.6	12	13.4	14.5	15.1	14.8	13.8	12.5	11.1	9.9	9.2	12.2
Average ultraviolet index	2	2	4	6	8	9	9	8	6	4	2	1	5
Source 1: Meteomanz (Temperatures-precipitation-precip days-snow days 2011-2024), Weather Atlas (Daylight-UV)
Source 2: Climate data (Humidity), Weatherbase (dew point), Weather2visit (sunshine)

== Politics ==
Durrës is a municipality governed by a mayor–council system with the mayor of Durrës and the members of the Durrës Municipal Council being responsible for the administration of Durrës Municipality. The mayor of Durrës is elected by its people to act as the executive officer of the municipality. The Durrës Municipal Council is the legislative body of the municipality and is also a democratically elected institution, comprising 51 councillors since the latest municipal election. Both, the mayor and members of the municipal council serve four-year terms without term limits.

== Economy ==
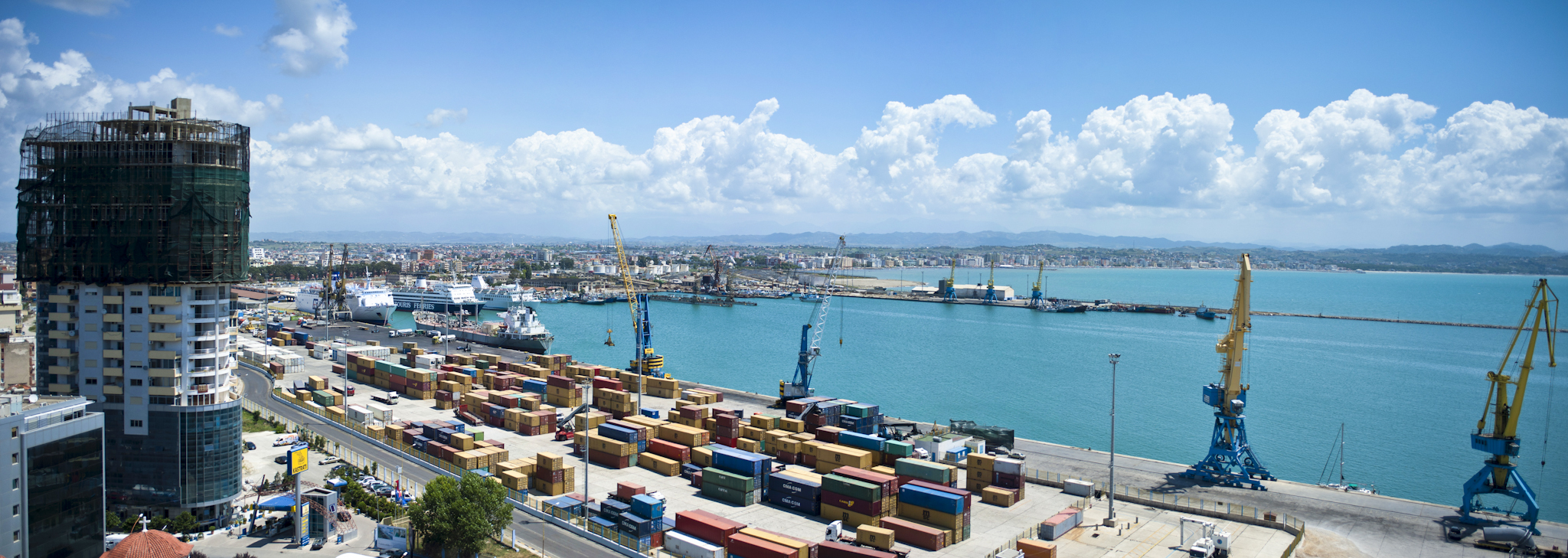
Its highly advantageous geographical location puts the Port of Durrës among the largest in the Adriatic and Ionian seas.

Durrës is an important link to Western Europe due to its port and its proximity to the Italian port cities, notably Bari, to which daily ferries run. As well as the dockyard, it also possesses an important shipyard and manufacturing industries, notably producing leather, plastic and tobacco products.

The southern coastal stretch of Golem is renowned for its traditional mass beach tourism having experienced uncontrolled urban development. The city's beaches are also a popular destination for many foreign and local tourists. In 2012, new water sanitation systems are being installed to eliminate sea water pollution. In contrast, the northern coastal stretch of Lalzit Bay is mostly unspoiled and set to become an elite tourism destination as a number of beach resorts are being built since 2009. Neighboring districts are known for the production of good wine and a variety of foodstuffs.

According to the World Bank, Durrës has made significant steps of starting a business in 2016. Durrës ranks ninth among 22 cities in Southeastern Europe before the capital Tirana, Belgrade, Serbia and Sarajevo, Bosnia and Herzegovina.

=== Transportation ===
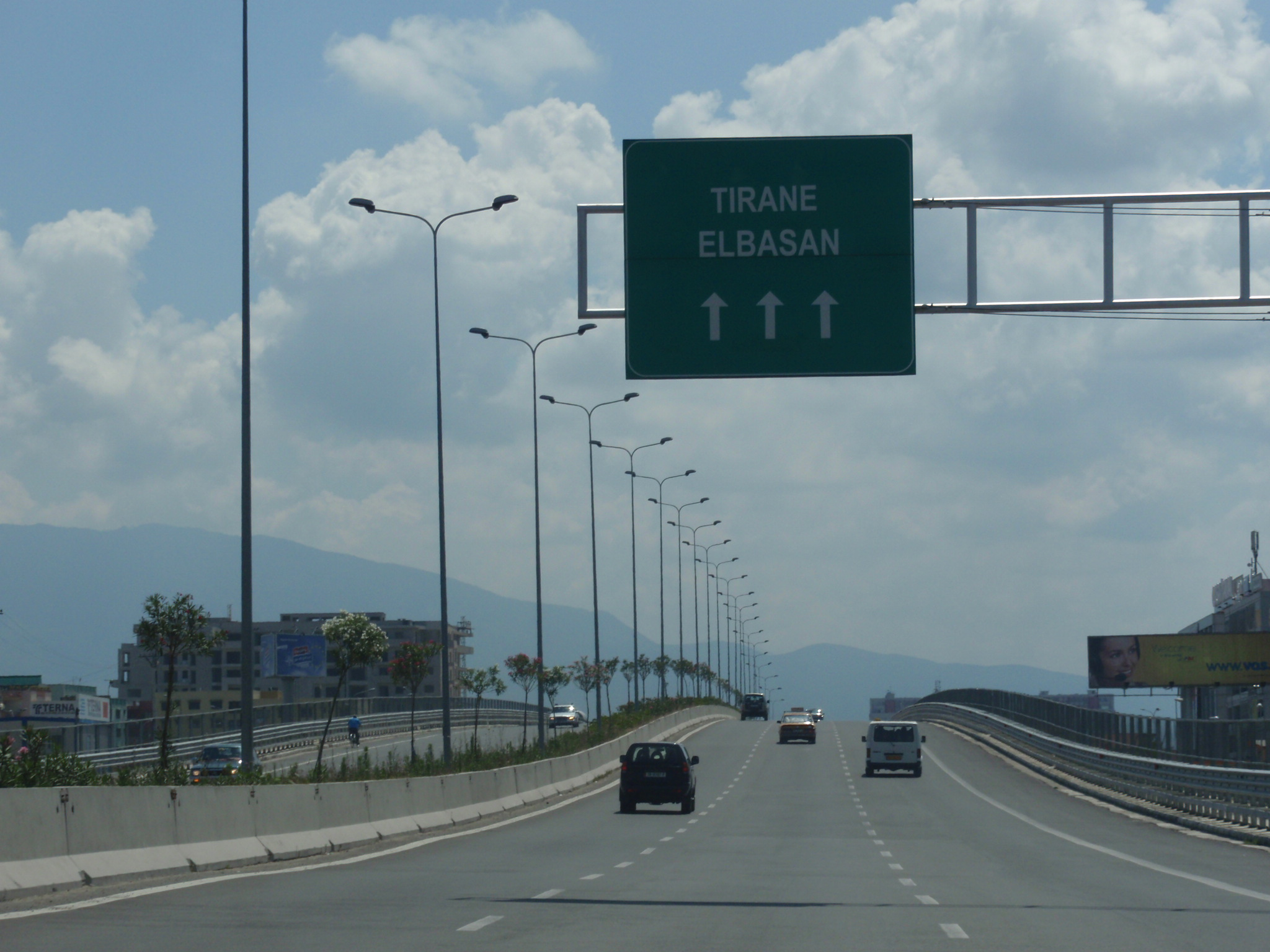
SH2 between Tirana and Durrës

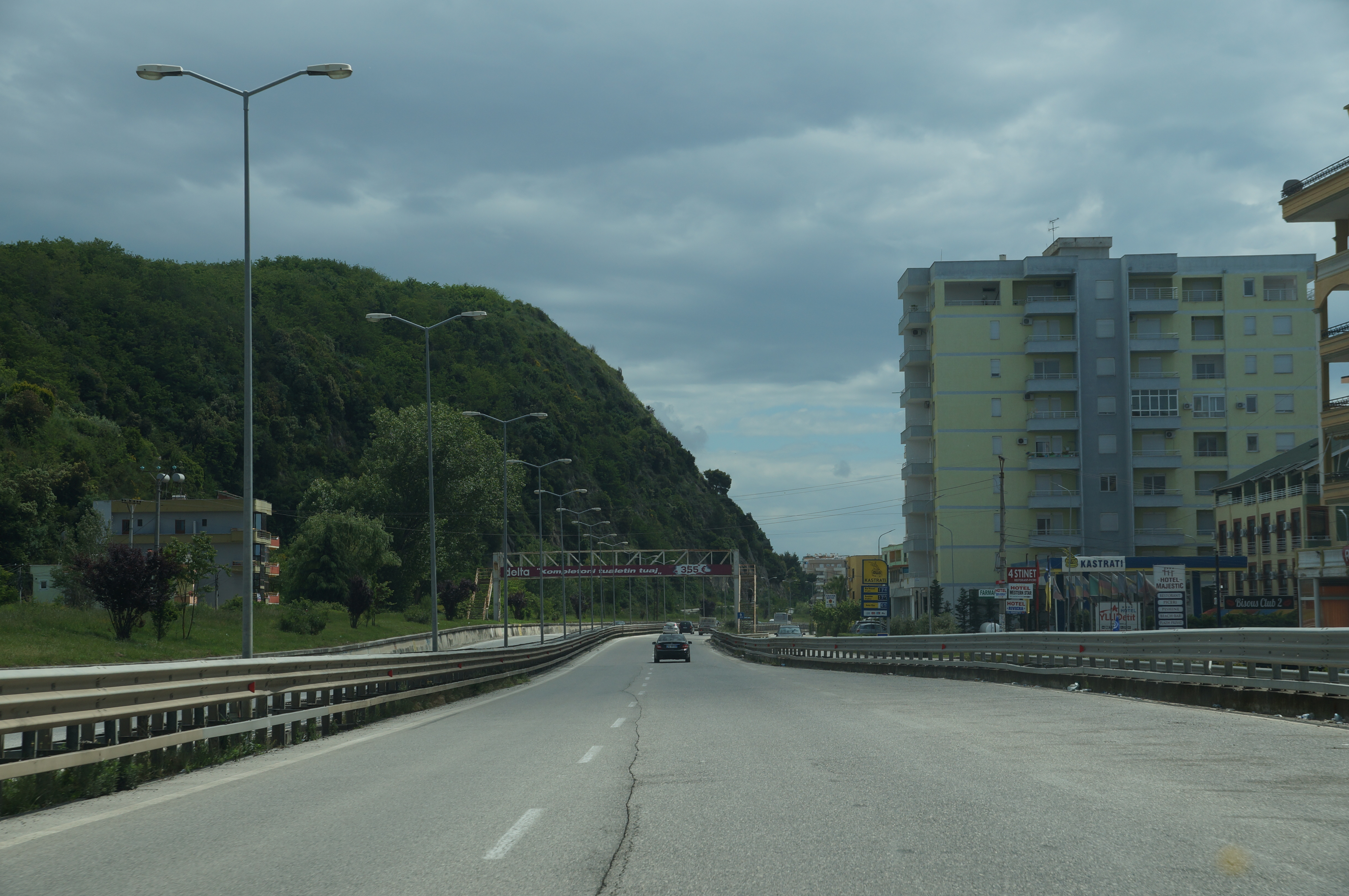
SH4 at Kavaja Rock along Golem beach resort area

Major roads and railways pass through the city of Durrës thank to its significant location and connect the northern part of the country to the south and the west with the east. Durrës is the starting point of Pan-European Corridor VIII, national roads SH2 and SH4, and serves as the main railway station of the Albanian Railways (HSH).

The Pan-European Corridor VIII is one of the Pan-European corridors. It runs between Durrës, at the Adriatic coast, and Varna, at the Bulgarian Black Sea coast. The National Road 2 (SH2) begins at the Port of Durrës at the Dajlani Overpass, bypasses the road to Tirana International Airport, and ends at the Kamza Overpass in the outskirts of Tirana where it meets National Road 1 (SH1) State Road heading to northern Albania. The Albania–Kosovo Highway is a four-lane highway constructed from 2006 to 2013 between Albania and Kosovo. As part of the South-East European Route 7, the highway will connect the Adriatic Sea ports of Durrës via Pristina, with the E75/Corridor X near Niš, Serbia. As most tourists come through Kosovo, the laying of the highway make it easier to travel to Durrës.

The Port of Durrës, in the south-west of the city, is one of the major ports of the Adriatic Sea and plays a very important role in the city's economy. The port is located on an artificial basin that is formed between two moles, with a west-northwesterly oriented entrance approximately wide as it passes between the ends of the moles. The port is also a key location for transit networks and passenger ferry, giving Durrës a strategic position with respect to the Pan-European Corridor VIII. The port has experienced major upgrades in recent years culminating with the opening of the new terminal in July 2012. In 2012, The Globe and Mail ranked Durrës at no. 1 among 8 exciting new cruise ports to explore. It is one of the largest passenger port on the Adriatic Sea that handle more than 1.5 million passengers per year.

The railway station of Durrës is connected to other cities in Albania, including the capital of Tirana, Vlorë, Elbasan and Shkodër. The Durrës–Tirana railway was a 38-kilometre (24-mile) railway line which joined the two biggest cities in Albania: Durrës and Tirana. The line connects to the Shkodër–Vorë railway halfway in Vorë, and to the Durrës–Vlorë railway in Durrës. In 2015, some rail stations and rolling stock along the Durrës-Tirana line are being upgraded and latter colored red and white.

A rail connection between Durrës and Pristina in Kosovo was proposed in 2021, with a feasibility study being prepared in 2022.

== Demographics ==
Historical population
Year	Pop.	±%
1923	4,785	—
1927	5,175	+8.2%
1938	10,506	+103.0%
1950	14,060	+33.8%
1960	39,937	+184.0%
1969	49,200	+23.2%
1979	66,200	+34.6%
1989	82,719	+25.0%
2001	99,546	+20.3%
2011	113,249	+13.8%
2023	101,728	−10.2%

Durrës is the second most populous municipality in Albania and one of the most populous on the Adriatic Sea with a growing number of inhabitants. According to the 2011 census, the municipal unit of Durrës had an estimated population of 113,249 of whom 56,511 were men and 56,738 women.

Islam was introduced to the city in the early 16th century during the Ottoman conquest. Much of the local population converted to Islam during the four centuries of Ottoman rule. The two most well-known mosques in the city are the Great Mosque of Durrës (built in 1931 on the site of an earlier Ottoman mosque) and the Fatih Mosque, erected in 1502 just one year after the city became part of the Ottoman Empire.

Christianity in Durrës and elsewhere in Albania has a presence dating back to classical antiquity. Christian traditions relate that the archbishopric of Durrës was founded by the apostle Paul while he was preaching in Illyria and Epirus and that there were possibly about seventy Christian families in the city as early as the time of the apostles. The Orthodox Church of Albania, which has been autocephalous since 1923, was divided into the archbishopric of Tirana–Durrës, headed by the Metropolitan and sub-divided into the local church districts of Tirana, Durrës, Shkodër and Elbasan.

== Culture ==
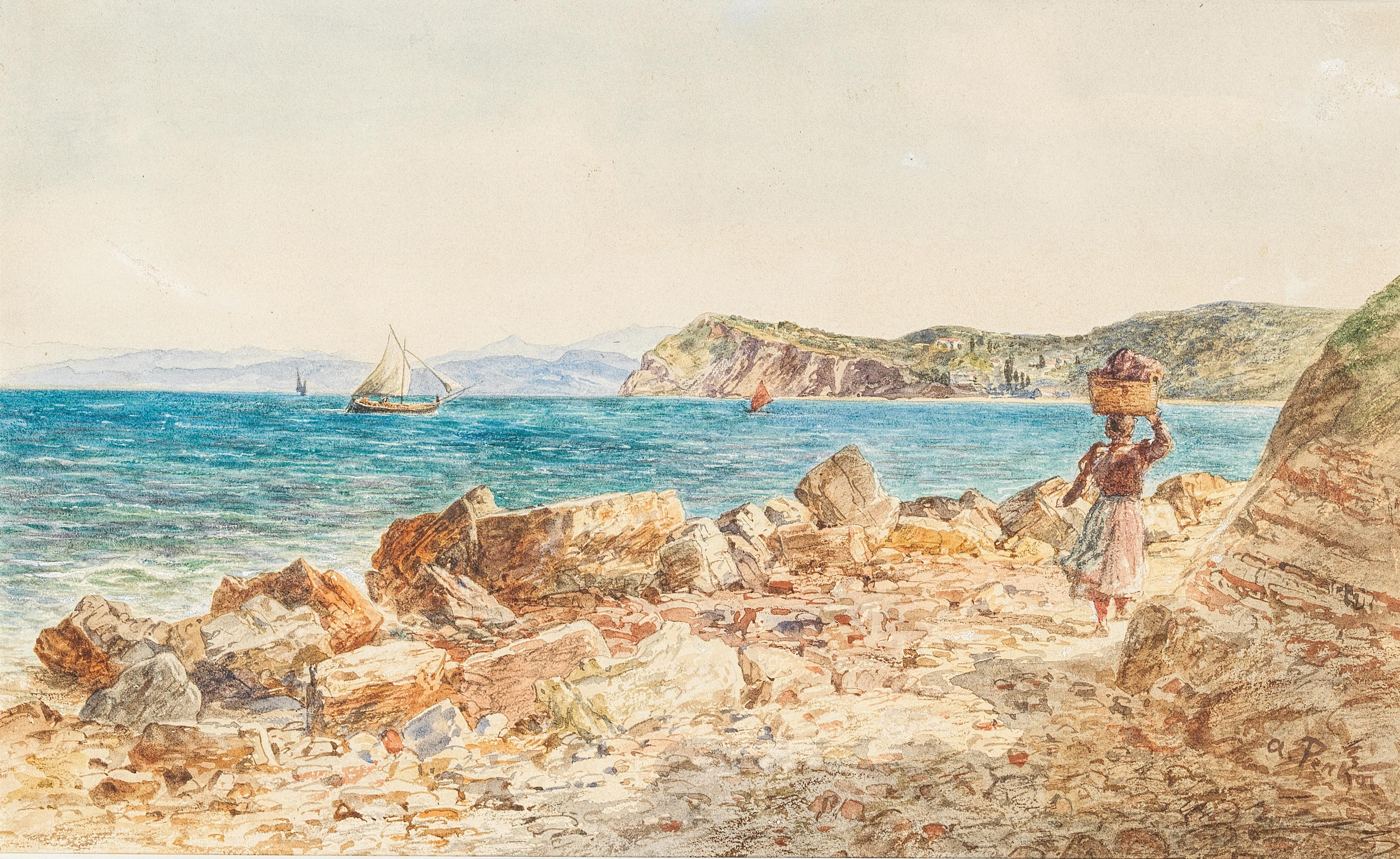
Anton Perko: Motif by the Durrës's coast (watercolor on paper – before 1905)

The theatrical and musical life of the city is centered on the Aleksandër Moisiu Theatre, the Estrada Theatre, a puppet theatre, and the Philharmonic Orchestra. The annual International Film Summerfest of Durrës, founded in 2008, is held in late August or early September in the amphitheatre. In 2004 and 2009, Miss Globe International was held in Durrës.

The city is home to different architectural styles that represent influential periods in its history. The architecture is influenced by Illyrian, Greek, Roman and Italian architecture. In the 21st century, part of Durrës turned into a modernist city, with large blocks of flats, modern new buildings, new shopping centres and many green spaces.

=== Education ===
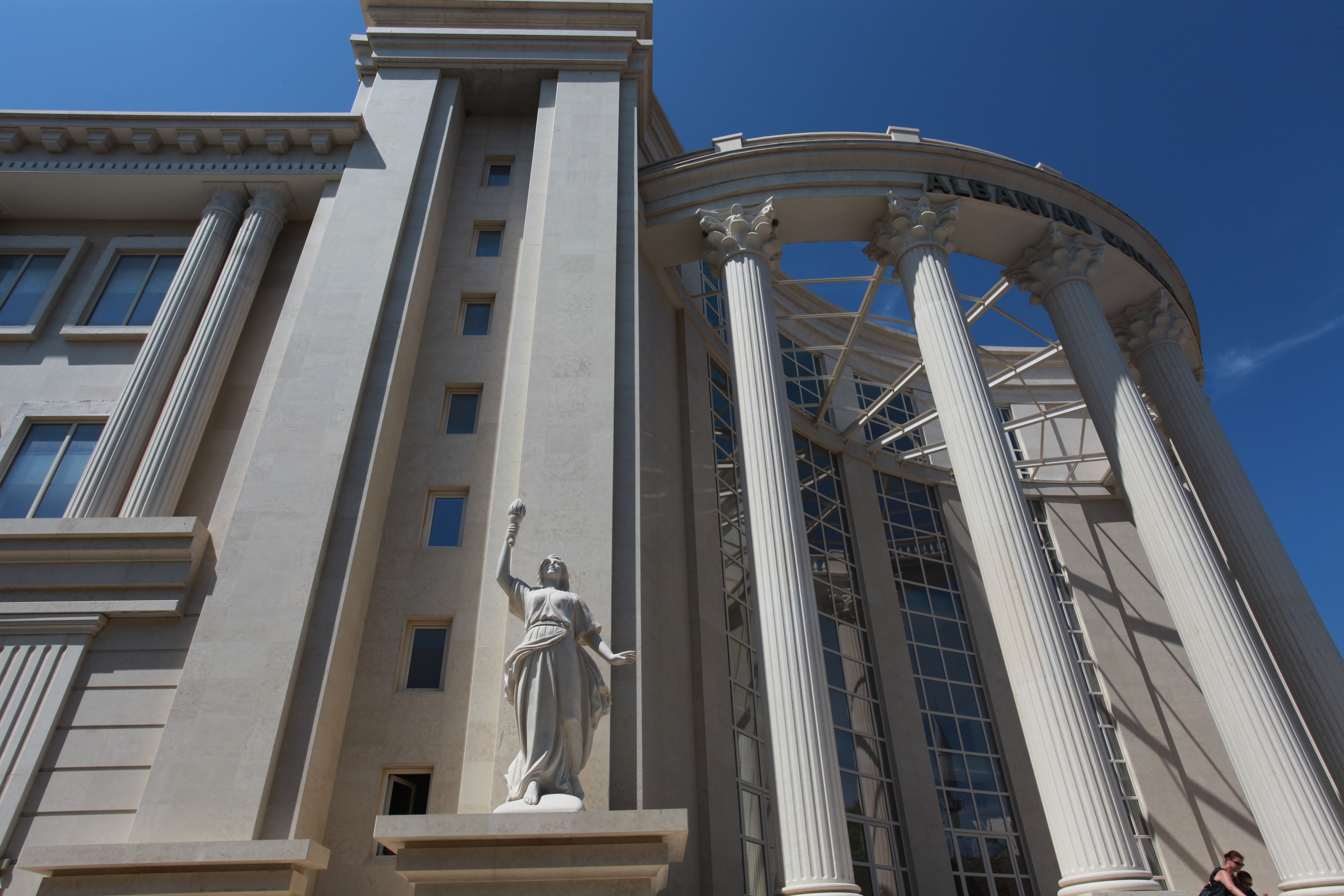
The Albanian College of Durrës

Durrës has a long tradition of education since the beginning of civil life from antiquity until today. After the fall of communism in Albania, a reorganization plan was announced in 1990, that would extend the compulsory education program from eight to ten years. The following year, major economic and political crisis in Albania, and the ensuing breakdown of public order, plunged the school system into chaos. Later, many schools were rebuilt or reconstructed, to improve learning conditions especially in larger cities of the country. Durrës is host to academic institutions such as the University of Durrës, Albanian College of Durrës, Kajtazi Brothers Educational Institute, Gjergj Kastrioti High School, Naim Frashëri High School, sports mastery school Benardina Qerraxhiu and Jani Kukuzeli Artistic Lycée.

One of the city's main sights is the Byzantine city wall, also called Durrës Castle, while the largest amphitheatre in the Balkans is close to the city's harbour. This fifth-century construction is currently under consideration for listing as a UNESCO World Heritage Site.

=== Museums ===
Durrës is home to the largest archaeological museum in the country, the Durrës Archaeological Museum, located near the beach. North of the museum are the sixth-century Byzantine walls constructed after the Visigoth invasion of 481. The bulk of the museum's collection comprises artefacts from the nearby ancient site of Dyrrhachium and includes an extensive collection from the Illyrian, Ancient Greek, Hellenistic and Roman periods. Items of major note include Roman funeral steles and stone sarcophagi, a colourful elliptical mosaic measuring 17 by 10 feet (5 m × 3 m), known as The Beauty of Durrës, and a collection of miniature busts of Venus, testament to the time when Durrës was a centre of worship of the goddess. There are several other museums including the Royal Villa of Durrës and the Museum of History (in the house of the actor Aleksandër Moisiu).

== International relations ==
In 2008, Bosnia and Herzegovina opened a consulate in the city considering that there is a community with Bosniak ancestry that lives in Durrës County. They are mostly concentrated in two neighborhoods of the city of Shijak, Borake and Koxhas.

These countries have an honorary consulate in Durrës:

- Hungary
- North Macedonia

=== Twin and sister cities ===
Durrës is twinned with:

- Bari, Italy
- Bitonto, Italy
- Istanbul, Turkey
- Thessaloniki, Greece

=== Cooperation and friendship ===
Durrës has cooperation and friendship relationships with:

- Kumanovo, North Macedonia
- Shantou, China
- Ulcinj, Montenegro

== See also ==
- List of ancient cities in Illyria
- List of mayors of Durrës
- List of people from Durrës

== Bibliography ==
- Demiraj, Bardhyl (1997). Albanische Etymologien: Untersuchungen zum albanischen Erbwortschatz. Leiden Studies in Indo-European (in German). Vol. 7. Amsterdam, Atlanta: Brill. ISBN 978-90-420-0161-9.
- Cabanes, Pierre (2008). "Greek Colonisation in the Adriatic". In Tsetskhladze, Gocha R. (ed.). Greek Colonisation: An Account of Greek Colonies and Other Settlements Overseas. Vol. 2. Brill. pp. 155–186. ISBN 9789047442448. Archived from the original on 23 September 2023.
- Crawford, Michael Hewson (1985). Coinage and Money under the Roman Republic: Italy and the Mediterranean Economy. The Library of Numismatics. Berkeley: University of California Press. ISBN 0-520-05506-3. Archived from the original on 20 January 2024.
- Demiraj, Shaban (2006). The origin of the Albanians: linguistically investigated. Academy of Sciences of Albania. ISBN 9789994381715. Archived from the original on 20 November 2020.
- Holmes, Catherine (2005). Basil II and the Governance of Empire (976–1025). Oxford University Press. ISBN 9780199279685. Archived from the original on 20 November 2020.
- Kazhdan, Alexander, ed. (1991). The Oxford Dictionary of Byzantium. Oxford and New York: Oxford University Press. ISBN 0-19-504652-8.
- Šašel Kos, Marjeta (2002). "Pyrrhus and Illyrian Kingdom(s?)". Greek Influence Along the East Adriatic Coast. Knjiga Mediterana. 26: 101–119. ISBN 9531631549. Archived from the original on 20 January 2024.
- Šašel Kos, Marjeta (2005). Appian and Illyricum. Narodni muzej Slovenije. ISBN 961616936X.
- Sassi, Barbara (2018). "Sulle faglie il mito fondativo: i terremoti a Durrës (Durazzo, Albania) dall'Antichità al Medioevo" (PDF). In Cavalieri, Marco; Boschetti, Cristina (eds.). Multa per aequora. Il polisemico significato della moderna ricerca archeologica. Omaggio a Sara Santoro. Fervet Opus 4, Vol. 2, part VII: Archeologia dei Balcani (in Italian). Presses Universitaires de Louvain, with the support of Centre d'étude des Mondes antiques (CEMA) of the Université catholique de Louvain. ISBN 978-2-87558-692-6. Archived from the original on 14 March 2023.

Sedlar, Jean W. (2013). East Central Europe in the Middle Ages, 1000-1500. University of Washington Press. ISBN 9780295800646.

- Stallo, Jennifer (2007). Isotopic Study of Migration: Differentiating Locals and Non-Locals in Tumulus Burials from Apollonia, Albania (Thesis). University of Cincinnati. Archived from the original on 29 January 2022.
- Stephenson, Paul (2003). The Legend of Basil the Bulgar-Slayer. Cambridge: Cambridge University Press. ISBN 978-0-521-81530-7. Archived from the original on 18 January 2023.
- Shehi, Eduard (2017). "Rishikim mbi topografinë e Durrësit antik në dritën e të dhënave të reja arkeologjike-historike [A review of topography of Durrës in antiquity in light of new archeological and historical data]". Iliria. doi:10.3406/iliri.2017.2528. ISSN 1727-2548. Archived from the original on 13 May 2022.
- Wilkes, John (1995). The Illyrians: The Peoples of Europe. Oxford, UK; Cambridge, MA, USA: Blackwell. ISBN 978-0-631-19807-9.
