= University of Dyrrhachium =

Medieval university in Albania

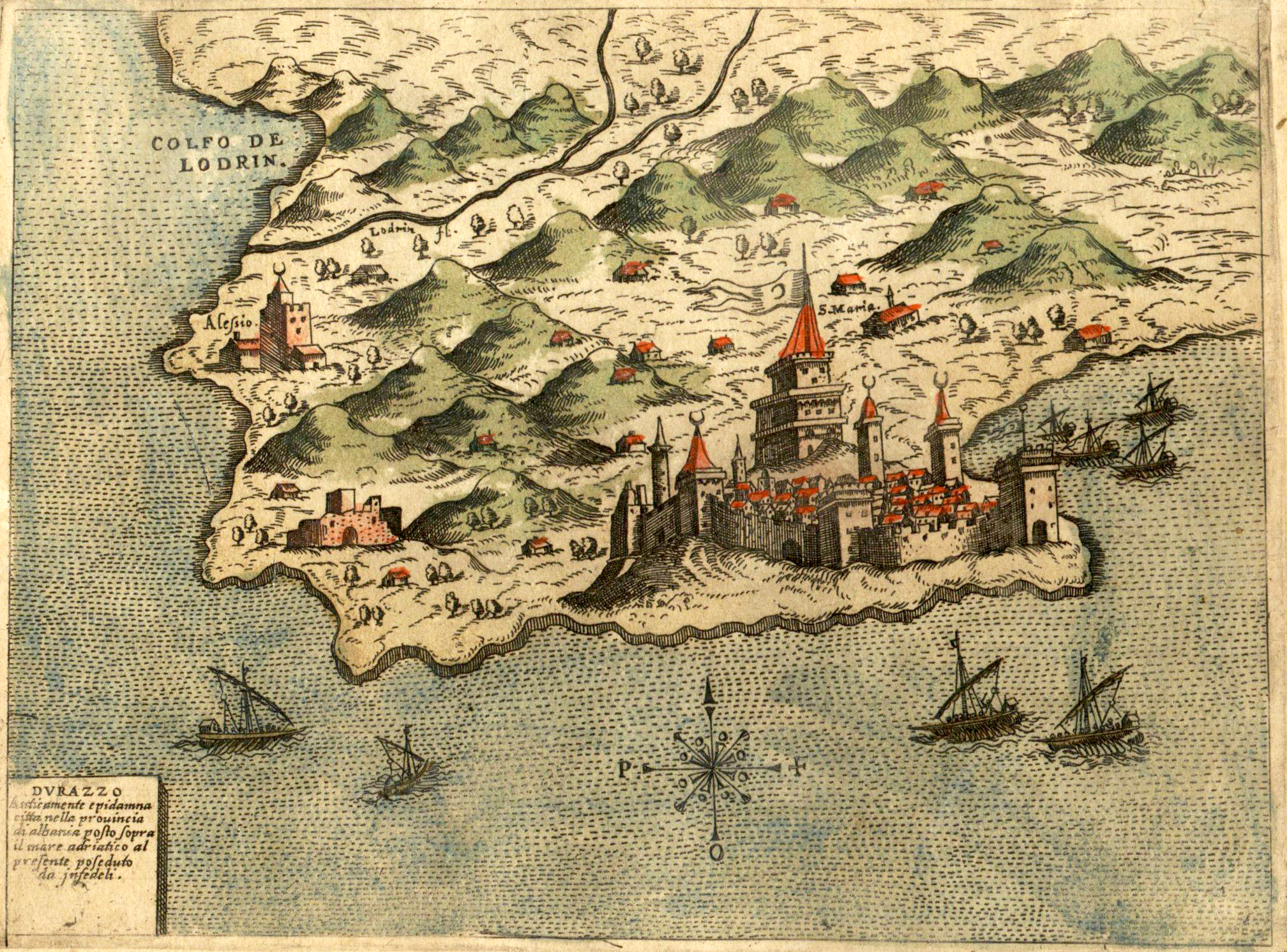

The University of Dyrrachium (Latin: Universitas Studiorum Dyrrhachium, Albanian: Universiteti i Studimeve të Durrёsit) was a Venetian theological university (Studium generale) in Durrës (Dyrrhachium), Venice, then Republic of Venice. The university was established around 1380, with its first rector being John of Dyrrhacium, and then transferred to Zadar in 1396, amid the mounting Ottoman threats in South-eastern Europe, thereby becoming the University of Zadar.

== See also ==
- Durrës
- Studium generale
- University of Zadar
- Medieval university
- Aleksandër Moisiu University of Durrës
