= Illyrian coinage =

Form of ancient coinage

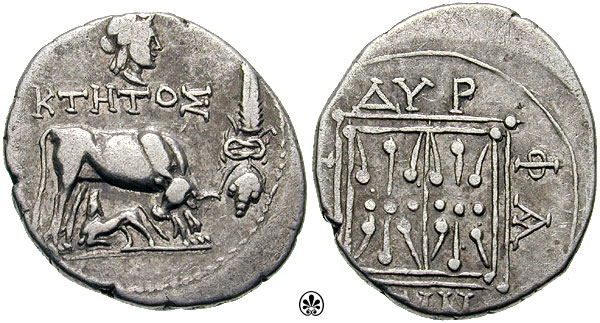
Coins of King Monunios - 280 BC.

Illyrian coinage which began in the 6th century BC continued up to the 1st century of Roman rule. It was the southern Illyrians who minted the first coins followed by the northern Illyrian during the Roman era. Illyrian coins have also been found in other areas apart from Illyria, such ancient Macedonia, Italy, Greece, Asia Minor and Egypt.

== Early coins ==
The earliest Illyrian coins were probably minted by the Tyntenoi north of Lake Ohrid minted coins around 540 BC with the Greek legend Tynteni. Their silver coins reached Italy, Egypt and many parts of Asia. They belonged to the group of 'Thraco-Macedonian' coinages of this period, and they bore the same emblems as the coins of Ichnae at the head of the Thermaic Gulf. Production ceased in the early 5th century BC, most likely in 475 BC when this period was one of comparative poverty, during which contacts were lost with mainland Greece and relations with Ionia via the Danube valley slackened.

The Messapians in southern Italy minted coins in the early 5th century BC. They were an early imitation of the Greek coins from Magna Grecia. The cities which minted these early mints were Valesio, Brindisi, Nardò, Oria, Ugento, Grax and Samadi. Valesio struck silver coins, Nardò silver and bronze while from the 3rd century BC only bronze coins were issued. The coins feature Iapyx, an ancient Iapygian hero. Other features included Athena, Heracles and Zeus.

At the same time as the Messapians, the Paeonian tribe of the Derrones were also producing coins. These coins are traditionally dated to 500 BC – 450 BC. Frequent depictions on the coins attributed to the Derrones are Oxen and Corinthian helmets. Their god, Darr(h)on, was worshipped by Paionians and Macedonians. The Paeonian kings dealt greatly and seriously with the minting coins. However this activity in terms of quality and appearance did not differ much from Greek coins. Even the Paeonians themselves at this time were becoming hellenized more and more and lost to a great degree their characteristic as a non-Greek people.

The earliest Illyrian coins in Illyria were minted from the start of the 4th century BC in the Illyrian city of Damastion and Daparria by the Illyrian tribe of the Dyestes under Bardylis, which had been influenced by Hellenization to an extent. For about 200 years, this city minted silver coins with symbols imitating those of the Hellenic cities in the Aegean, as well as original symbols such as tongs of a metal smelter. The circulation of Damastion coins included Kosovo, southern Serbia, North Macedonia and the Adriatic coast from Shkodër to Split. The presence of silver mines around the city in ancient sources made it possible for the minting of coins in such a great abundance.

== Illyrian kings ==
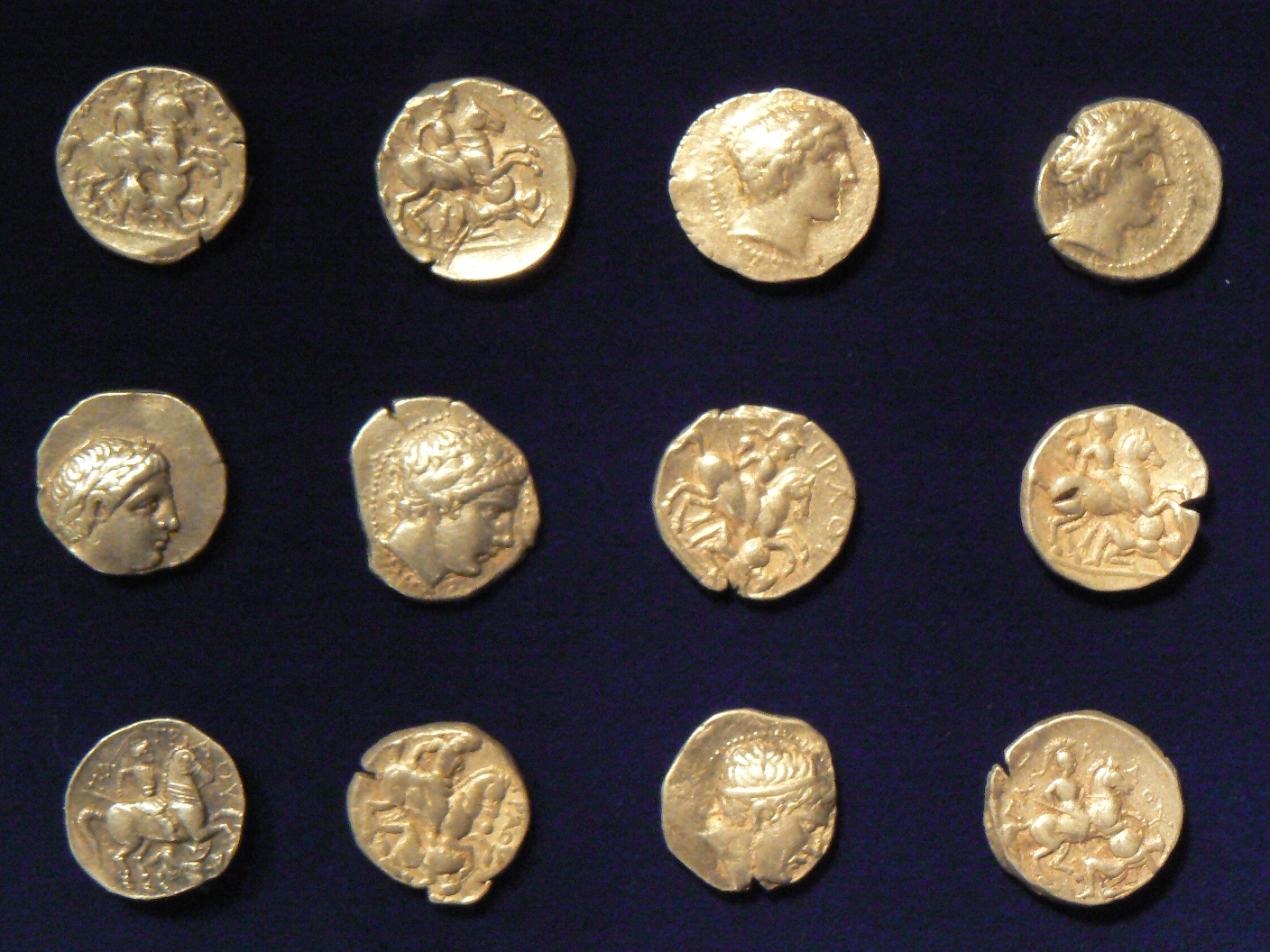
Silver tetradrachms dated back to the reign of Patraus.

The only kings to have minted coins bearing their names were Lycceius, Patraus, Audoleon, Monunios, Mytilus, Gentius and Ballaios.

=== Patraus ===
The coinage of Patraus is remarkable. It bears on the obverse a head of Apollo, which may be an allusion to the king's name, Apollo being known under the name of Patraus. On the reverse of the coins is a horseman riding over an enemy, alluding to victories over the Macedonians, and an inscription naming the king.

=== Audoleon ===
The coins of Audoleon have a head wearing a Corinthian helmet on the obverse and on the reverse a horse stepping, very boldly executed and an inscription naming the king.

=== Monunios ===
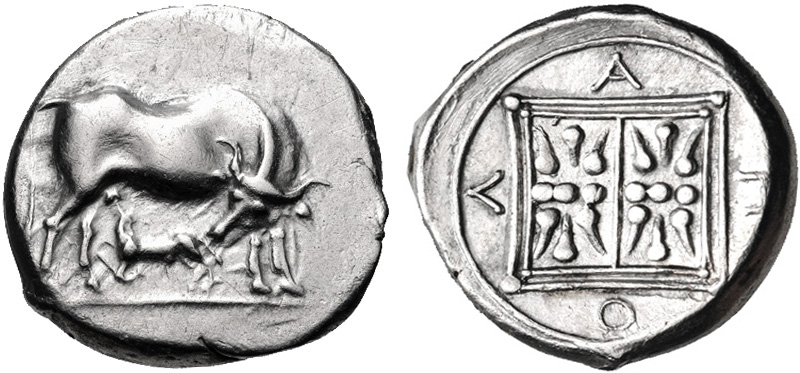
Apollonia's coin. A cow and a suckling calf. Reverse: double stellate pattern within dual linear border and the inscription A Π O Λ around.

The first Dardanian king to have minted silver coins was Monunios in the beginning of the 3rd century BC, around 280 BC. He struck his coins in the Greek colony of Durrës and they differed only in having the jaw of a boar set over the cow, as a symbol of the royal Illyrian house. The coins also had the abbreviated inscription 'ΔYP' (for Durrës) to donate the place where they were minted, as well as showing royal sovereignty over the city. These coins have been found in great numbers in the Illyrian city of Gurëzeza, and in the interior of Albania beyond Apollonia. The Illyrian kingdom under Monunios extended as far as the Lyncestian Lakes, and from here Monunios could have intervened in the quarrel about the Macedonian throne, eventually turning into a claimant for it. This surely is the meaning of the minting of a second series of silver coins bearing his name and traditional Macedonian symbols, the head of Heracles on the face and on the reverse, Olympian Zeus sitting on his throne. That this, was a short lived dream of the Illyrian king is shown by the fact that so few coins were minted, so much that only one specimen is preserved today.

=== Mytilus ===
Mytilus, the successor of King Monunios, struck his coins 10 years later around 270 BC. His bronze coinage with the symbols of the city of Durrës in Albania bear his name. The coinage of Apollonia in the same period bore only his monogram, as well as symbols similar to those of the Aetolian League.

=== Gentius ===
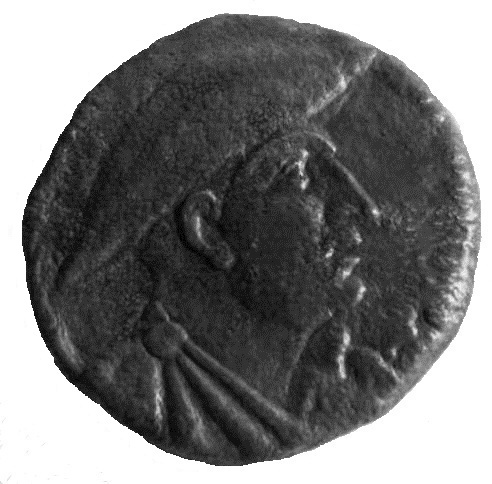
King Gentius on a bronze coin.

The most productive coinage is of Gentius who ruled from 181 BC. Two of his mints were located in Shkodra, the ancient Illyrian capital at the time of his regn, and in Lezha, both located in modern-day north-eastern Albania. His coins were also struck in Durrës, where the royal title is absent from any silver coin, and the name Gentius, not uncommon to an Illyrian male, may belong not to the king but to a local magistrate. However, around 30 to 40 examples of bronze coins have been recorded with the legend 'King Genthios'. Upon his defeat by the Romans in 168 BC his treasury of 120,000 silver pieces were conveyed to Rome.

=== Ballaios ===
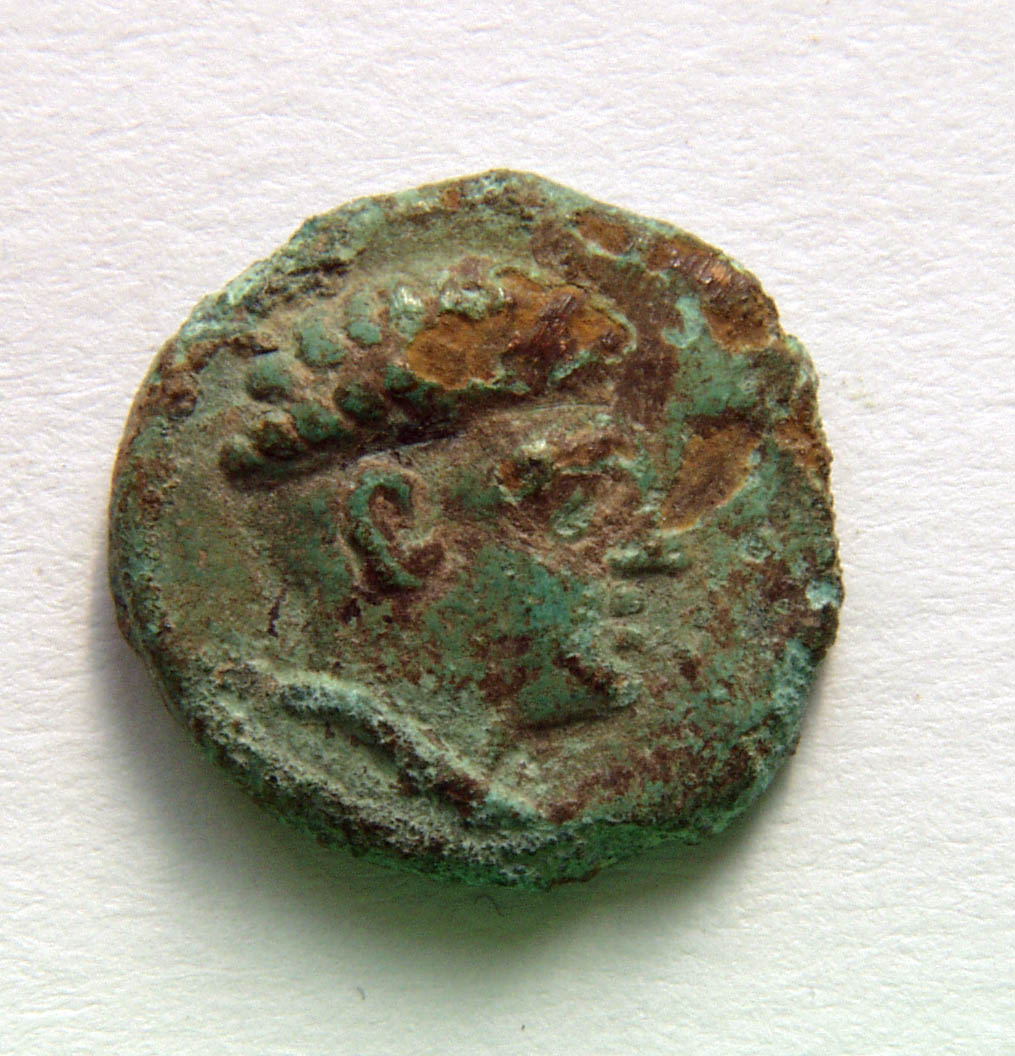
King Ballaios on a bronze coin.

Ballaios reigned after the kingdom of Gentius was dissolved into the Roman Empire from around 167 BC – 135 BC. The abundance of the coinage of Ballaios in the region would suggest that he was a powerful and influential king although no literary of historical evidence of him exists. The coins of the well-known king Gentius are scarce in comparison to the coins of Ballaios. His silver issues are rare, but bronze coins (without the royal title) occur on Hvar in Croatia, both in single finds and in hoards, and at Rhizon, the ancient capital of Queen Teuta, in a different series bearing the royal title. The coins of Ballaios were widely imitated in the region, sometimes so crudely that they are unintelligible. Ballaios struck coins in two cities: Pharos and Rhizon. The weight of the bronze coins are between 1.0 and 4.5 g, while most of the documented specimens weigh between 2.0 and 2.5 g. The relativity great impact of the coinage of Ballaios is indicated by a large number of imitations of his coins. His coins are found in both the eastern Adriatic shores and frequently in Italy, which confirms the trade contacts between the two Adriatic coasts.

On the obverse of his coins a bust of the king facing left to right is depicted, while on the reverse Artemis (advancing or standing) is represented, with or without a torch and sometimes carrying one or two spears. It is significant that Ballaios also had silver coins minted, which indicates his wealth and power, since elsewhere in Dalmatia, silver coinage is very rarely documented from the Greek and Illyrian mints.

== City coins ==
The coins of ancient Lissus, modern-day Lezha, with the legend 'LISSITAN' began with autonomous issues under the Macedonian influences (211 BC – 197 BC). The coins were followed later by the issues of Gentius with a ship on the reverse and a third series from the period after the kings removal. Lissus minted coins on behalf of the community of the Lissians and minted a rare coin with an inscription over the head of an Illyrian god wearing a causia type hat. The face depicted on the Lissian coins was originally thought to be of King Gentius, although Albanian archaeologist, Hasan Ceka has proved it to be the head of the Illyrian sea god, Rodon. The head of Artemis and an Illyrian shield is depicted on some Lissian coins. The Shkodra coins fall into three similar groups, the first and third with the legend 'SKODRI-NON' and the second with the legend of king Gentius. In the city of Rhizon a mint was established that issued several coinages. These included autonomous coinages of the town, in bronze, the royal coinage of king Ballaios, in silver and bronze, most probably, the coinage labeled “Coinage from the Rhizonian Gulf”, which has been considered as the coinage of an alliance in which Rhizon played a part, in silver and bronze.

Daorson coin with a galley on the reverse.

The chronology of these coinages is still not defined with precision, primarily because the historical background of their issuance remains little known. There is hardly any mention in the literary sources of the town of Rhizon, and none of the king Ballaios. However, several features of these coinages - such as the characteristics of style, elements of inscription and iconography (especially the presence of the title “basileus” on the coinage of Ballaios, and the presence of a Macedonian shield on the “Coinage from the Rhizonian Gulf”), metrology, choice of coined metals, etc. – point to the 3rd and 2nd centuries BCE as the general chronological framework for the activity of the Rhizonian mint and for the successive issuance of the coinages of different issuing authorities there. Around Lake Scutari the Labeates issued a rare type of bronze coin, bearing the head of an Illyrian deity and a Liburnian warship with a dolphin swimming underneath. Between 217 BC and 84 BC the city of Oria in Italy minted coins with the head of Lapagus, the ancient Iapygian hero. In Daorson the capital of the Daorsi in modern Bosnia, 39 different coins (29 bearing the image of King Ballaios from 168 BC, and 9 with a Greek inscription and a boat image) have been discovered. Money was of immense importance to the Daorsi, ensuring the tribe's independence while also confirming their well developed business, cultural and trade links with other peoples. Illyrian coins also appeare in other ancient cities especially those in the south of Illyria, such as in the Illyrian/Greek cities of Byllis, Amantia, Pelion and Olympe. The koinon of the Bylliones centred on the city of Byllis minted its own bronze coins. The first coins came out around 270 BC and continued until 167 BC when the Romans dissolved the koinon.

== See also ==
- Illyria
- Illyrians
- Gentius
- Illyrian kingdom
- Illyrian Mythology
