= Ballaios =

Illyrian king

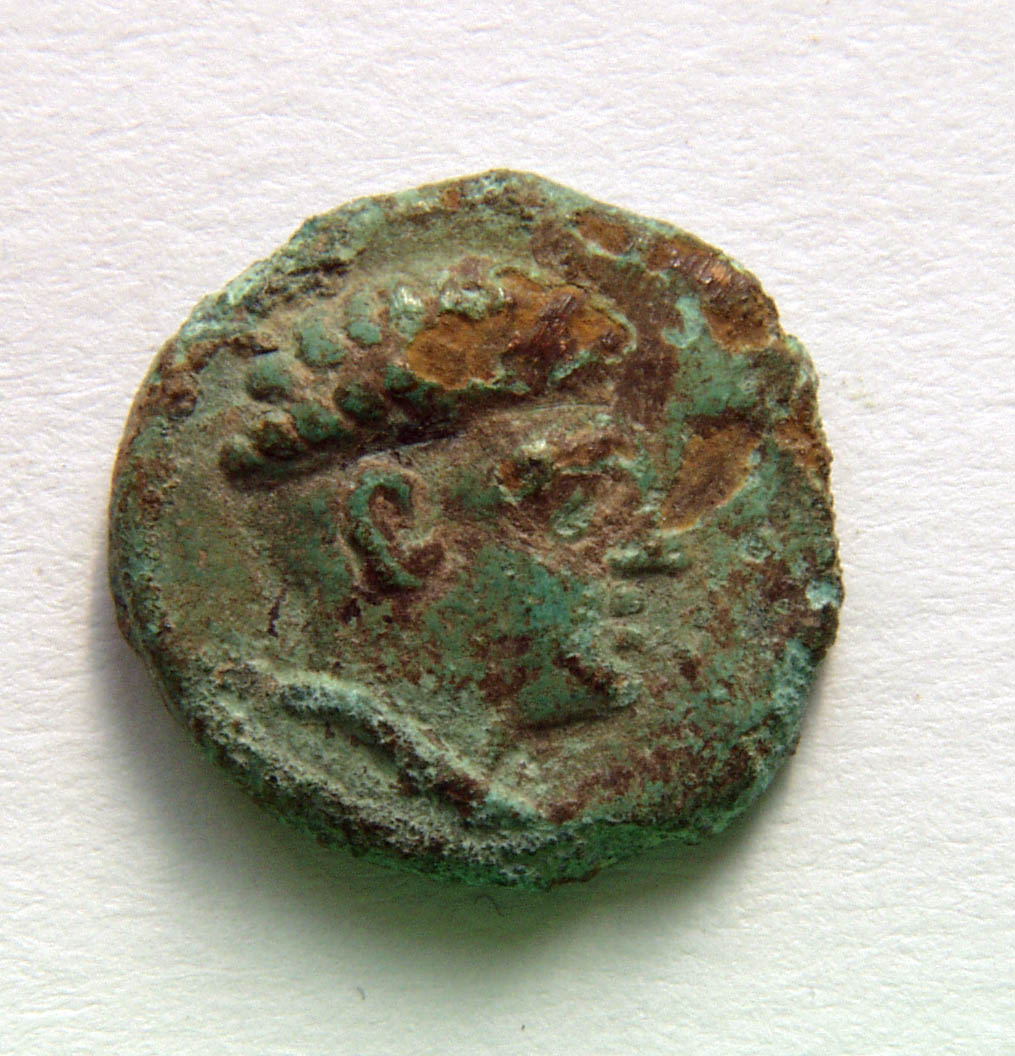
- Coin of Ballaios
- Reign: c. 260 – c. 230 BC
- Predecessor: ?
- Successor: Agron

Ballaios (Ancient Greek: Βαλλαῖος; ruled c. 260 – c. 230 BC) was an Illyrian king of the Ardiaei tribe. Attested only in coinage, Ballaios is considered as the predecessor of Agron. He is considered to have been a powerful and influential king as testified by the abundance of his silver and bronze coinage found along both coasts of the Adriatic. A hoard found in 2010 is one of the biggest hoards of ancient coins known, not only from Illyria. The capital of Ballaios' kingdom was Rhizon.

His silver issues are rare, but bronze coins, without the royal title, occur on Hvar, both in single finds and in hoards, and at Rhizon in a different series bearing the royal title. In the city of Ulcinj there is still a fully functioning water source bearing his name: "Kroni i Ballos". The coins of Ballaios were widely imitated in the region, sometimes so crudely that they are unintelligible.

== Reign ==
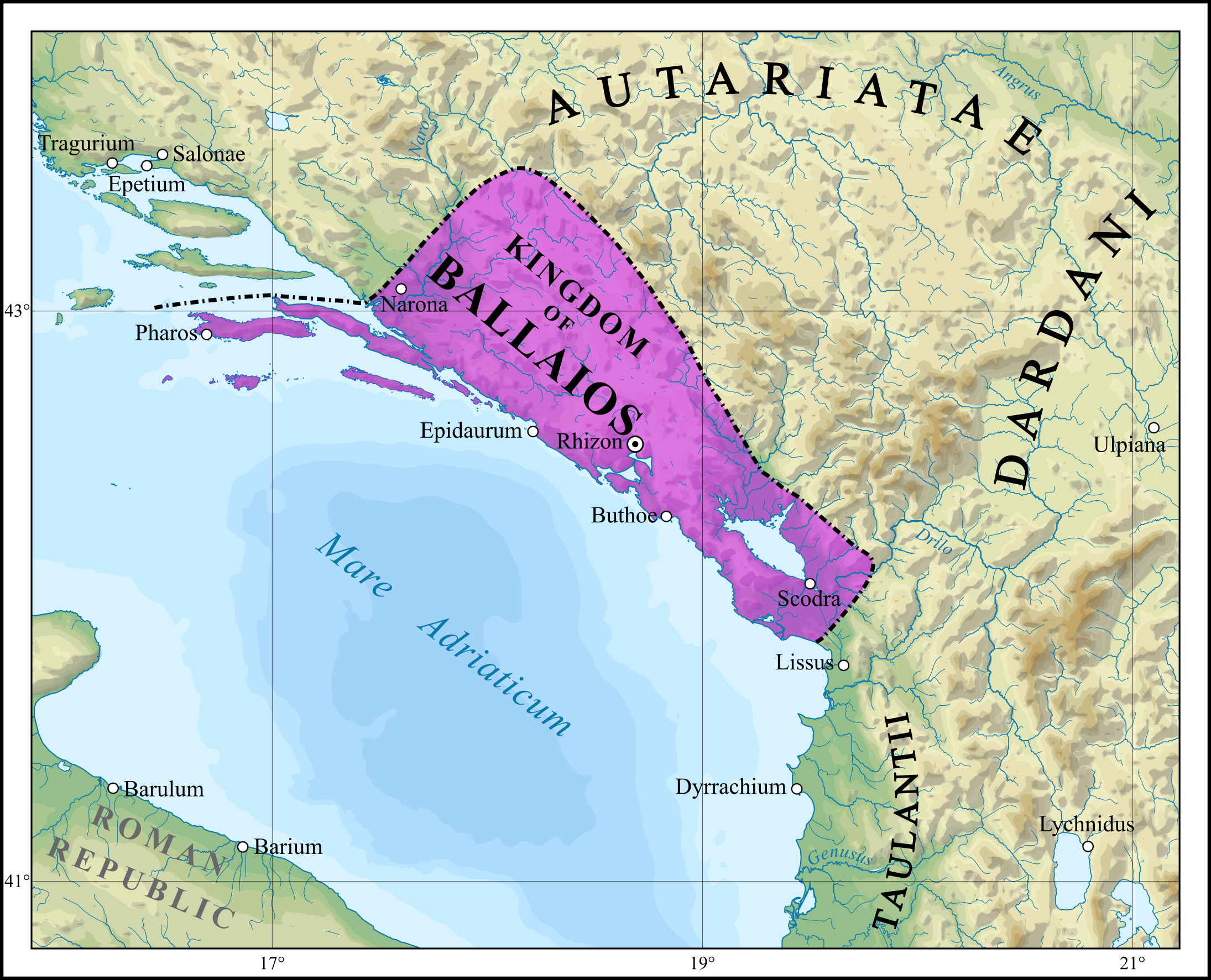
Hypothtical territory of the Ardiaean Kingdom under the reign of Ballaios.

Prior to the recent excavations carried out in the 2010s, archaeologist Arthur Evans dated Ballaios' coinage c. between 167 BC and 135 BC, in the period between the fall of Macedon and the expedition by the consul Servius Fulvius Flaccus against the Illyrians. J. M. F. May (1930s) dated it c. between 195/190 BC and 175 BC, which was followed by G. Gorini (1991), and Šašel Kos (2007).

After the recent excavations, the archaeological contexts of the coin hoards of Ballaios found in the 2010s indicate an earlier period. Archaeological investigations conducted in the area of Rhizon have revealed that Ballaios was in power and minted coins in the period between c. 260 and 230 BC, providing a clear dating for his reign.

== Coinage ==
Coins of King Ballaios

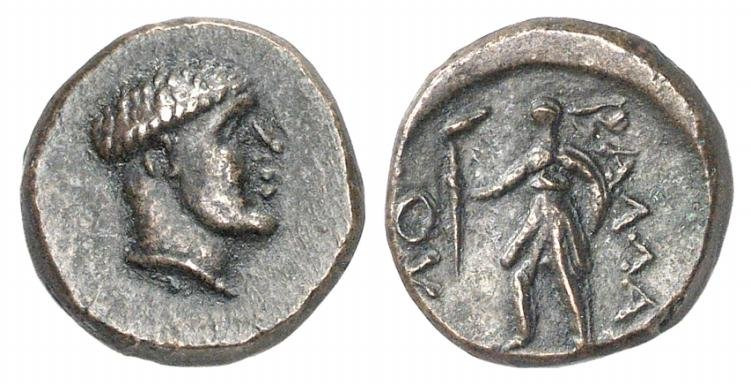
Bronze coin of King Ballaios. Head of Ballaios. Rv.Artemis holding torch, inscription: ΒΑΛΛΑΙΟΥ (of Ballaios).

A. Mint locations. B. Locations where coins of king Ballaios were uncovered.

Ballaios minted coins in his own name. His coins with the long legend ΒΑΣΙΛΕΩΣ ΒΑΛΛΑΙΟΥ (BASILEOS BALLAIOY) were minted in Rhizon while the coins with the short legend ΒΑΛΛΑΙΟΥ and the head of the king Ballaios which is of a different type and are older, were minted in Pharos. In some cases it is possible to observe that Ballaios' coins were over struck on the older Pharos specimens. The distribution of his coinage indicates that they were concentrated in the central Dalmatian area, while the large number of different dies that have been identified to date indicates a long minting of his coins. Numismatic evidence shows that Ballaios reigned for quite a lengthy time. His coins are also frequently found in Italy, which confirms the trade contacts between both Adriatic coasts.

On the obverse of the coins a bust of the king facing left to right is depicted, while on the reverse Artemis, advancing or standing, is represented with or without a torch, sometimes carrying one or two spears, surrounded by either the long or short legend. Most of these coins are bronze, some, and always those with the long legend are silver. Their weight, c. 3.5g corresponds top the Roman victorium. It is significant the Ballaios also had silver coins minted, which indicates his wealth and power, since elsewhere in Hellenistic Dalmatia silver coinage is very rarely documented from Greek/Illyrian mints. The weight of the bronze coins of Ballaios is between 1.0 and 4.5g, while most of the documented specimens weigh between 2.0 and 2.5g. The relatively great impact of the coinage of Ballaios is also indicated by a large number of imitations of his coins. In several instances on some coins, an embossed circular Illyrian shield on one side and the flying horse Pegasus, a mythological creature, and the letter "B", "A" and "L" on the other side, are depicted.

Ballaios' coins were in circulation in the regions along both Adriatic coasts; along the eastern Adriatic, they have been found in a broad area extending from Phoenice in Epirus to Shkodër, in present-day Albania, to Pharos, and along the western Adriatic from Leuca and Locri to Aquileia, indicating trade activity of Ballaios that was no longer controlled by Issa. As expected the coins of Ballaios were also found in the broad area of Narona, the most important Greek/Illyrian emporium which maintained along with the river Neretva, commercial and other contacts with the interior regions or Illyricum.

== See also ==
- List of rulers of Illyria
- Illyrian coinage

== Bibliography ==
- Bilić, Tomislav (2020). "Greek-Illyrian coinage of the central Adriatic region: an overview". TEME. 2 (LATINA & GRAECA – NOVA SERIJA 38): 7–20. ISSN 1820-7804.
- Cabanes, Pierre (1988). Les illyriens de Bardulis à Genthios (IVe–IIe siècles avant J.-C.) [The Illyrians from Bardylis to Gentius (4th – 2nd century BC)] (in French). Paris: SEDES. ISBN 2718138416.
- Ciołek, Renata (2010). Piotr Dyczek (ed.). "Great hoard" of 4656 coins of King Ballaios from Risan (PDF). Ośrodek Badań nad Antykiem Europy Południowo-Wschodniej. pp. 7–12. ISBN 978-83-928330-5-5. ISSN 0860-5777.
- Dyczek, Piotr (2019). "Illyrian King Ballaios, King Agron and Queen Teuta from ancient Rhizon". ANODOS Studies of the Ancient World (13/2013). Trnavská univerzita v Trnave, Filozofcká fakulta: 195–202. ISSN 1338-5410.
- Dyczek, Piotr (2020). "Rhizon – capital of the Illyrian kingdom – some remarks". In Krzysztof Jakubiak; Adam Lajtar (eds.). Ex Oriente Lux. Studies in Honour of Jolanta Młynarczyk. Wydawnictwa Uniwersytetu Warszawskiego. pp. 423–433.
- Dzino, Danijel (2010). Illyricum in Roman Politics, 229 BC–AD 68. Vol. 21. Cambridge University Press. ISBN 978-0-521-19419-8.
- Šašel Kos, Marjeta (2007). "The Illyrian King Ballaeus – Some Historical Aspects". In Berranger, Danièle; Centre de recherches sur les civilisations antiques (eds.). Épire, Illyrie, Macédoine: Mélanges offerts au Professeur Pierre Cabanes. Presses Universitaire Blaise Pascal. ISBN 978-2-84516-351-5.
- Ujes Morgan, Dubravka (2010). "Ancient Greek Coin Finds from Risan". In Jean-Luc Lamboley, Maria Paola Castiglioni (ed.). L'Illyrie Méridionale et l'Épire dans l'Antiquité – V. Actes du Ve colloque international de Grenoble (8-11 octobre 2008). Vol. 1. De Boccard. ISBN 9782951943339.
