= Thracian horseman =

Ancient Thracian divinity

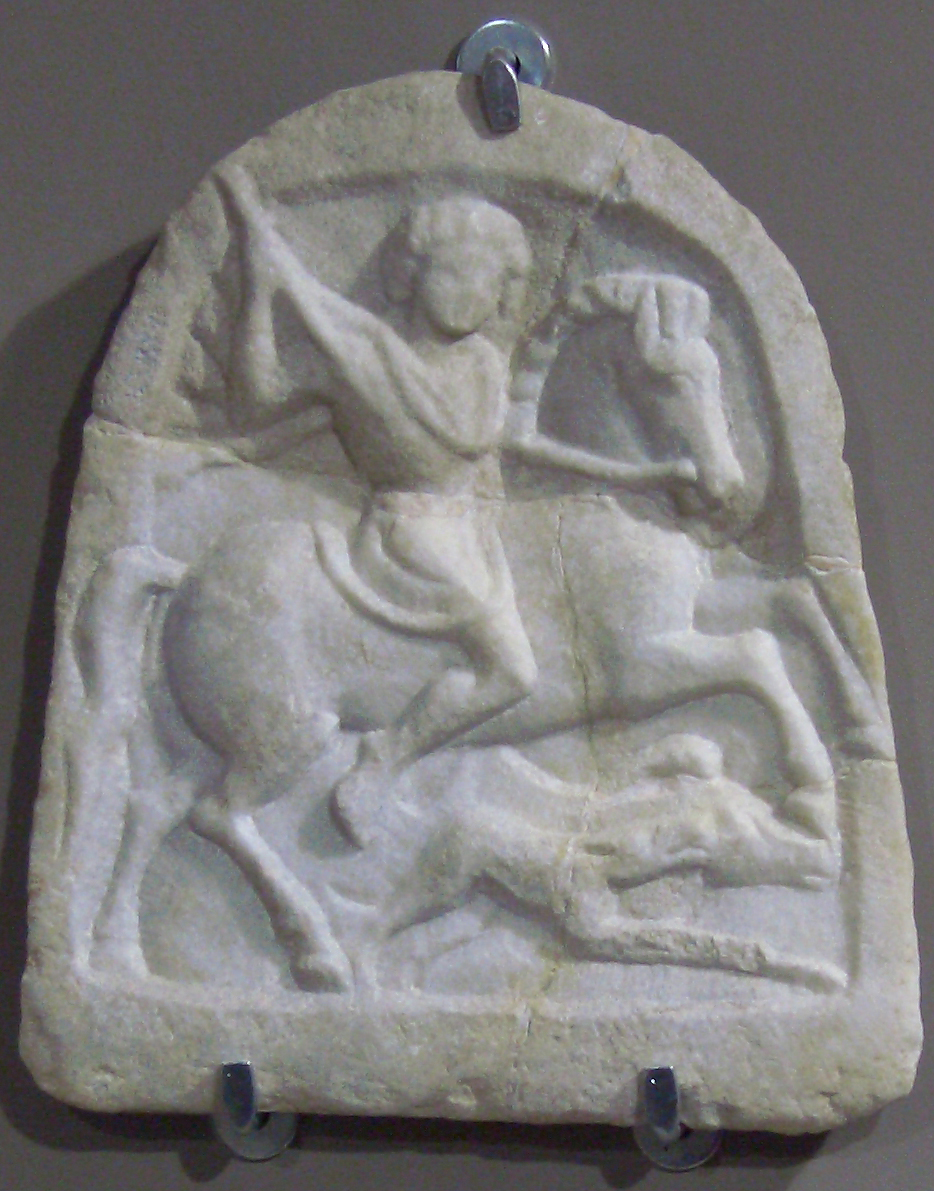
"Thracian horseman" votive tablet with the standard iconographic elements: the rider is holding a lance in his right hand aiming at a boar attacked by a hunting dog.

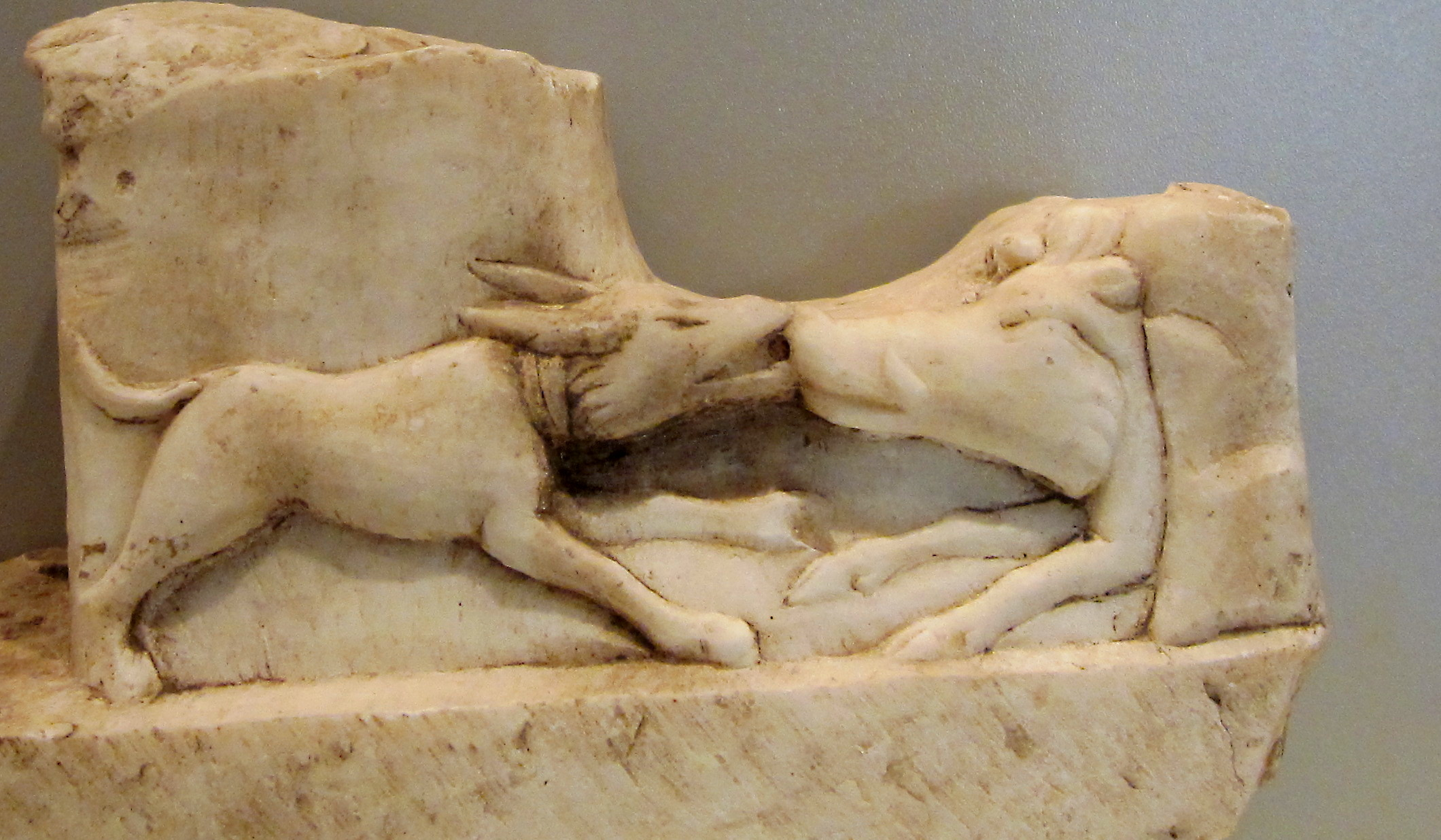
Fragment from a Thracian horseman marble relief: the hunting dog attacking the boar

The Thracian horseman (also "Thracian Rider" or "Thracian Heros") is a recurring motif depicted in reliefs of the Hellenistic and Roman periods in the Balkans—mainly Thrace, Macedonia, Thessaly and Moesia—roughly from the 3rd century BC to the 3rd century AD. Inscriptions found in Romania identify the horseman as Heros and Eros (Latin transcriptions of Ἥρως) and also Heron and Eron (Latin transcriptions of Ἥρων), apparently the word hero used as a proper name. He is sometimes addressed in inscriptions merely as κύριος, δεσπότης or ἥρως.

The Thracian horseman is depicted as a hunter on horseback, riding from left to right. Between the horse's hooves is depicted either a hunting dog or a boar. In some instances, the dog is replaced by a lion. Its depiction is in the tradition of the funerary steles of Roman cavalrymen, with the addition of syncretistic elements from Hellenistic and Paleo-Balkanic religious or mythological tradition.

== Name ==
The original Palaeo-Balkan word for 'horseman' has been reconstructed as *Me(n)zana-, with the root *me(n)za- 'horse'. It is based on evidence provided by:

- Albanian: mëz or mâz 'foal', with the original meaning of 'horse' that underwent a later semantic shift 'horse' > 'foal' after the loan from Latin caballus into Albanian kalë 'horse'; the same root is also found in Albanian: mazrek 'horse breeder';
- Messapic: menzanas, appearing as an epithet in Zis Menzanas, found in votive inscriptions, and in Iuppiter Menzanas, mentioned in a passage written by Festus in relation to a Messapian horse sacrifice;
- Romanian: mânz;
- Thracian: ΜΕΖΗΝΑ̣Ι mezēnai, found in the inscription of the Duvanli gold ring also bearing the image of a horseman.

== Iconography ==
Images of the Thracian Horseman appear in Thrace and in Lower Moesia, but also in Upper Moesia among Thracian populations and Thracian soldiers. According to Vladimir Toporov (1990), an initial number of iconographies number 1,500, found in modern Bulgaria and in Yugoslavia.

== Interpretation ==
The horseman was a common Palaeo-Balkan hero.

The motif depicted on reliefs most likely represents a composite figure, a Thracian hero, possibly based on Rhesus, the Thracian king mentioned in the Iliad, to which Scythian, Hellenistic and possibly other elements had been added.

== Late Roman syncretism ==
The cult of the Thracian horseman was especially important in Philippi, where the Heros had the epithets of Hero Auloneites, soter ('saviour') and epekoos 'answerer of prayers'. Funerary stelae depicting the horseman belong to the middle or lower classes (while the upper classes preferred the depiction of banquet scenes).

Under the Roman Emperor Gordian III the god on horseback appears on coins minted at Tlos, in neighboring Lycia, and at Istrus, in the province of Lower Moesia, between Thrace and the Danube.

In the Roman era, the Thracian horseman iconography is further syncretised. The rider is now sometimes shown as approaching a tree entwined by a serpent, or as approaching a goddess. These motifs are partly of Greco-Roman and partly of possible Scythian origin. The motif of a horseman with his right arm raised advancing towards a seated female figure is related to Scythian iconographic tradition. It is frequently found in Bulgaria, associated with Asclepius and Hygeia.

Stelai dedicated to the Thracian Heros Archegetas have been found at Selymbria.

Inscriptions from Bulgaria give the names Salenos and Pyrmerula/Pirmerula.

== Epithets ==
Apart from syncretism with other deities (such as Asclepios, Apollo, Sabatius), the figure of the Thracian Horseman was also found with several epithets: Karabasmos, Keilade(i)nos, Manimazos, Aularchenos, Aulosadenos, Pyrmeroulas. One in particular was found in Avren, dating from the III century CE, with a designation that seems to refer to horsemanship: Outaspios, and variations Betespios, Ephippios and Ouetespios.

Bulgarian linguist Vladimir I. Georgiev proposed the following interpretations to its epithets:

- Ouetespios (Betespios)—related to Albanian vetë 'own, self' and Avestan aspa- 'horse', meaning 'der selbst Pferd ist'.
- Outaspios—corresponds to Greek epihippios 'on a horse'.
- Manimazos—related to Latin mani 'good' and Romanian mînz; meaning 'the good horse'.
- Karabasmos—related to Old Bulgarian gora 'mountain' and Greek phasma 'phantom'; meaning 'mountain-phantom' ("Berg-geist", in German).

Bulgarian linguist Ivan Duridanov interpreted the following theonyms:

- Руrumērulаs (Variations: Руrmērulаs, Руrymērulаs, Pirmerulas)—linked to Greek pyrós 'maize, corn'; and PIE stem *mer 'great'.

== Related imagery ==
=== Twin horsemen ===
Related to the Dioscuri motif is the Danubian horsemen motif of two horsemen flanking a standing goddess. These Danubian horsemen take their name from their reliefs being found around the lower Danube. However, some reliefs have also been found in Roman Dacia - hence the alternate term "Dacian horsemen". Scholarship locates its diffusion across Moesia, Dacia, Pannonia and Danube, and, to a lesser degree, in Dalmatia and Thracia.

The motif of a standing goddess flanked by two horsemen, identified as Artemis flanked by the Dioscuri, and a tree entwined by a serpent flanked by the Dioscuri on horseback was transformed into a motif of a single horseman approaching the goddess or the tree.

=== Madara Rider ===
The Madara Rider is an early medieval large rock relief carved on the Madara Plateau east of Shumen, in northeastern Bulgaria. The monument is dated in the c. 7th/8th century, during the reign of Bulgar Khan Tervel. In 1979 became enlisted on the UNESCO World Heritage Site. The relief incorporates elements of the autochthonous Thracian cult.

== Legacy ==
The motif of the Thracian horseman was continued in Christianised form in the equestrian iconography of both Saint George and Saint Demetrius.

The motif of the Thracian horseman is not to be confused with the depiction of a rider slaying a barbarian enemy on funerary stelae, as on the Stele of Dexileos, interpreted as depictions of a heroic episode from the life of the deceased.

== Gallery ==
Hunter motif

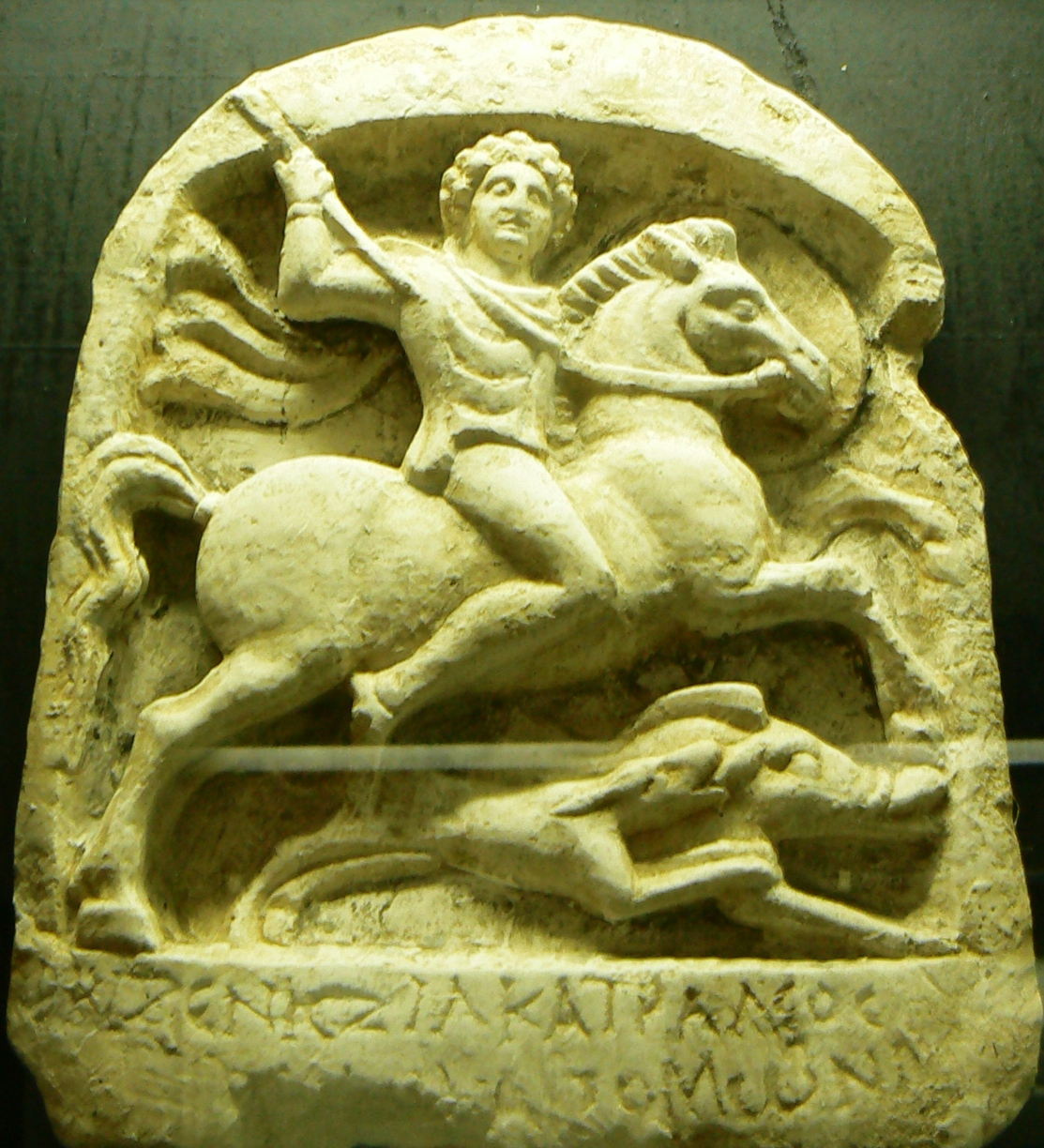
Thracian horseman with hound and boar, Greek inscription (3rd century BC), Teteven museum

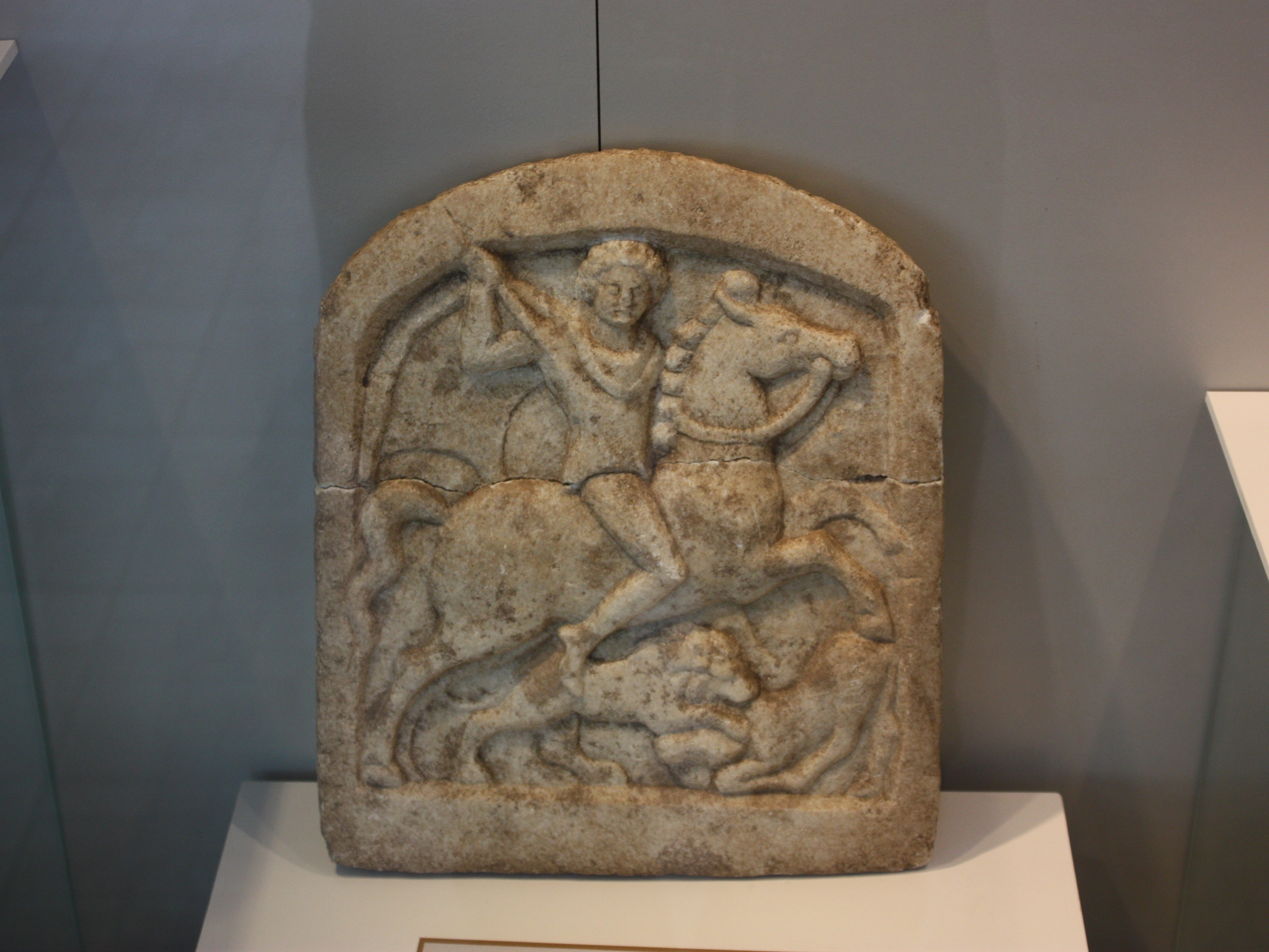
Thracian horseman attacking a lion which is in turn attacking its prey. Madara Museum, Bulgaria

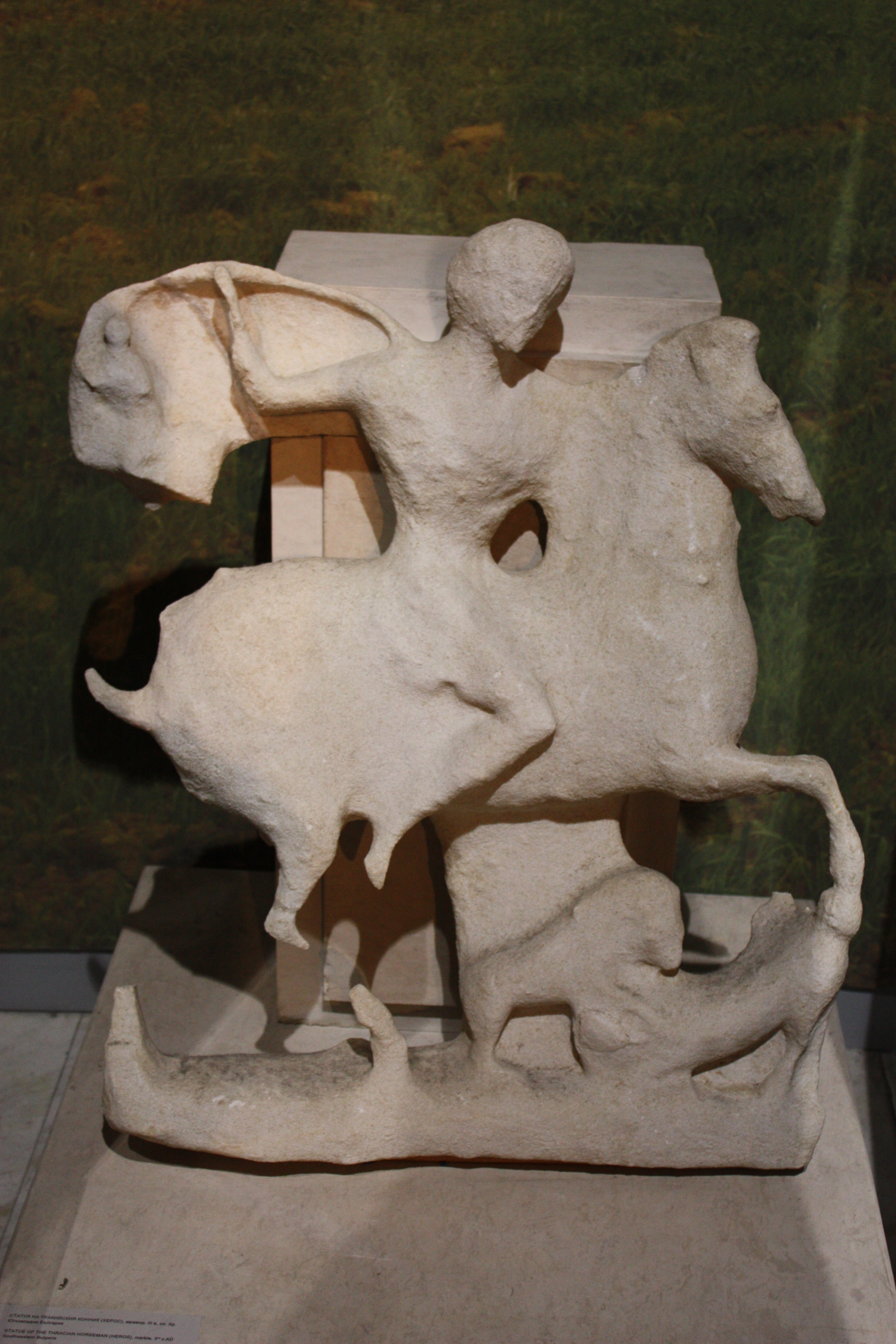
Statue of a Thracian horseman with lion, 3rd century, National History Museum of Bulgaria

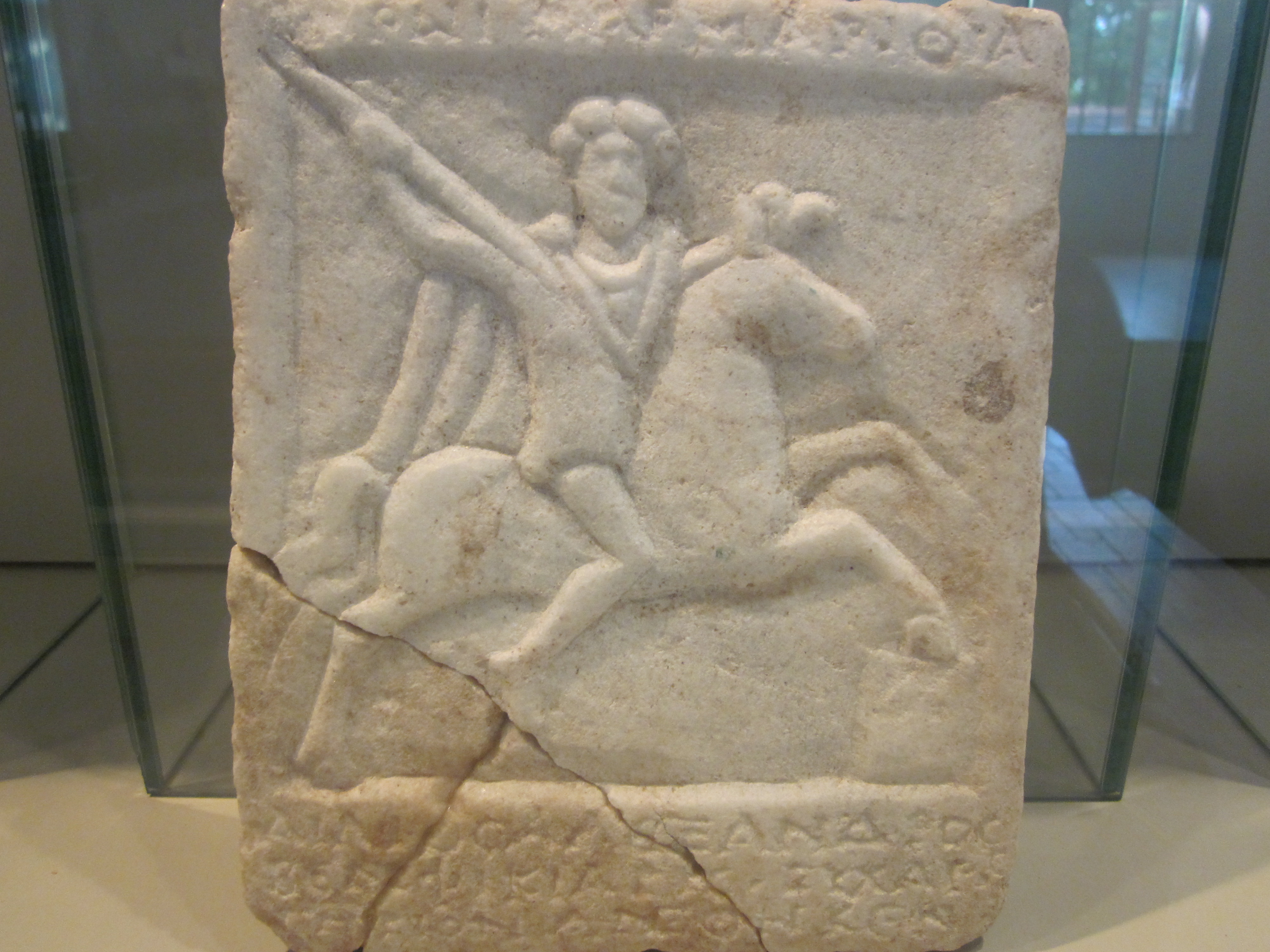
Thracian horseman, funerary stele with Greek inscription, Madara Museum, Bulgaria

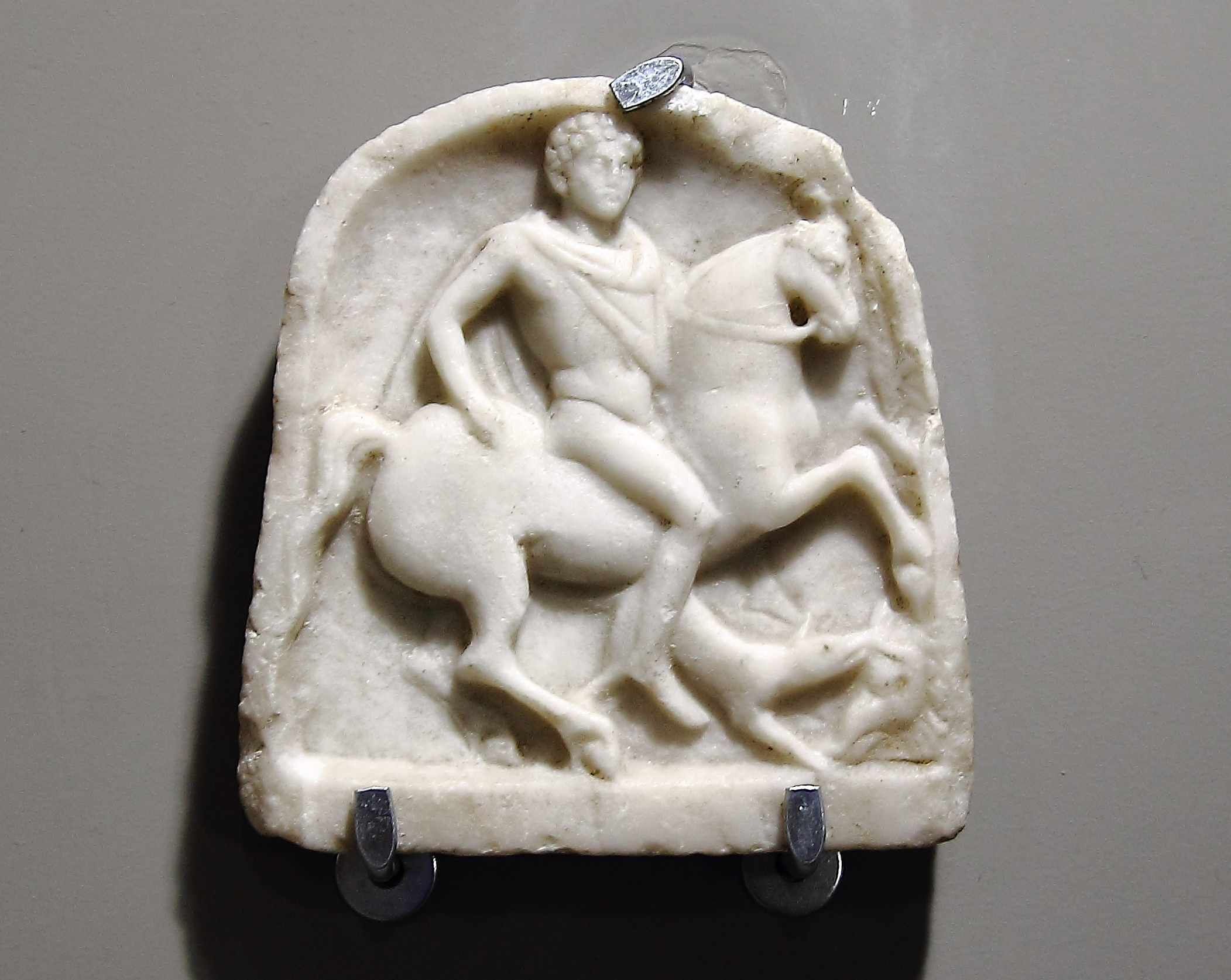
Thracian horseman with hound, marble votive tablet, Stara Zagora regional history museum

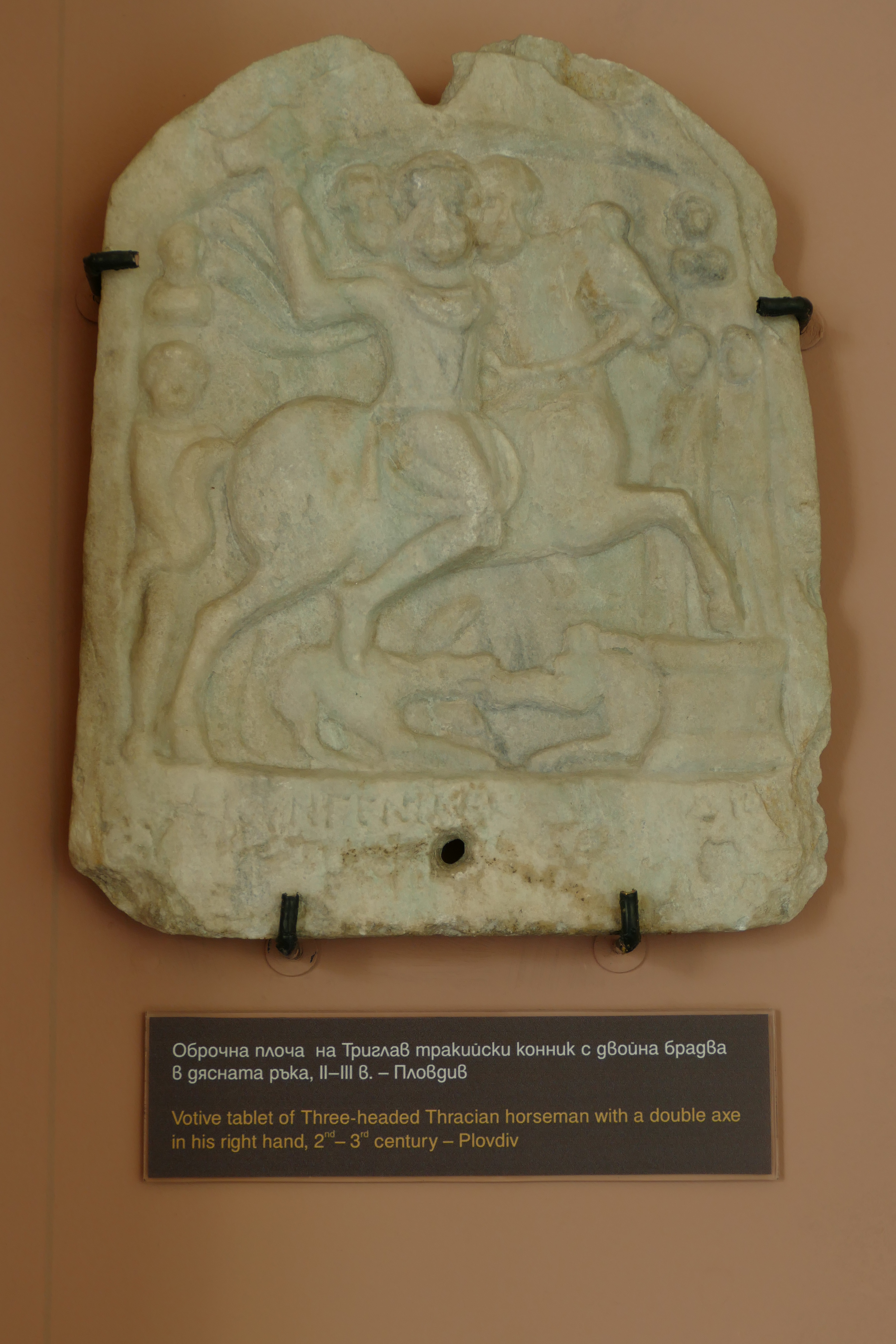
Thracian horseman with three heads and axe/hammer, 2-3rd century, Plovdiv Museum
Serpent-and-tree

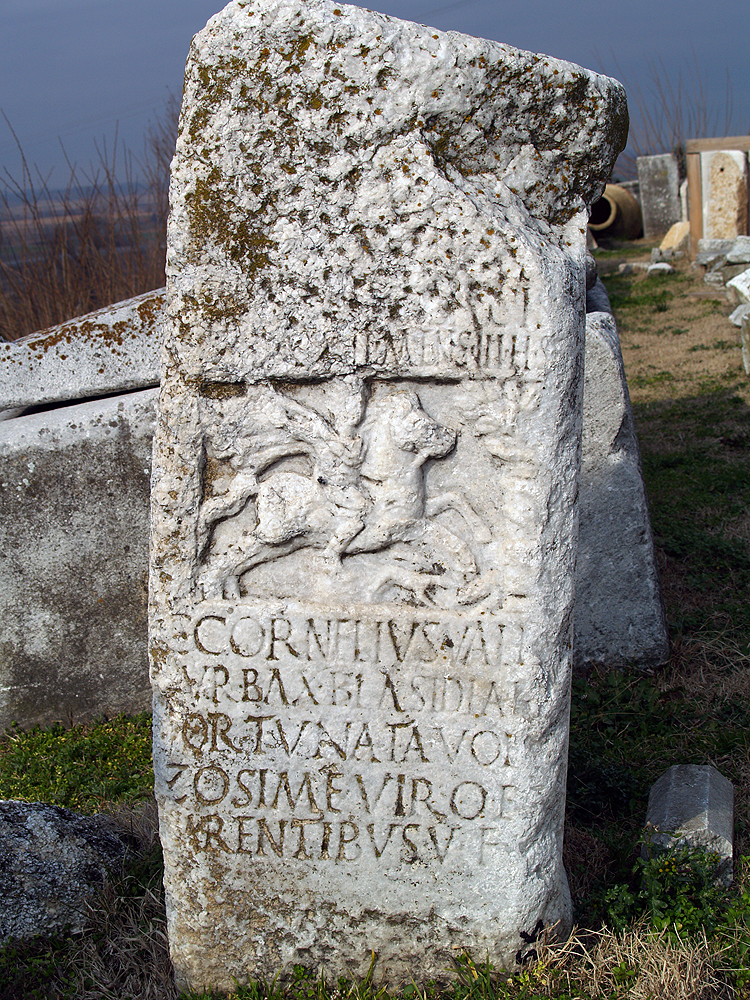
Thracian horseman with hound and serpent-entwined tree, funerary stele for one Caius Cornelius at Philippi.

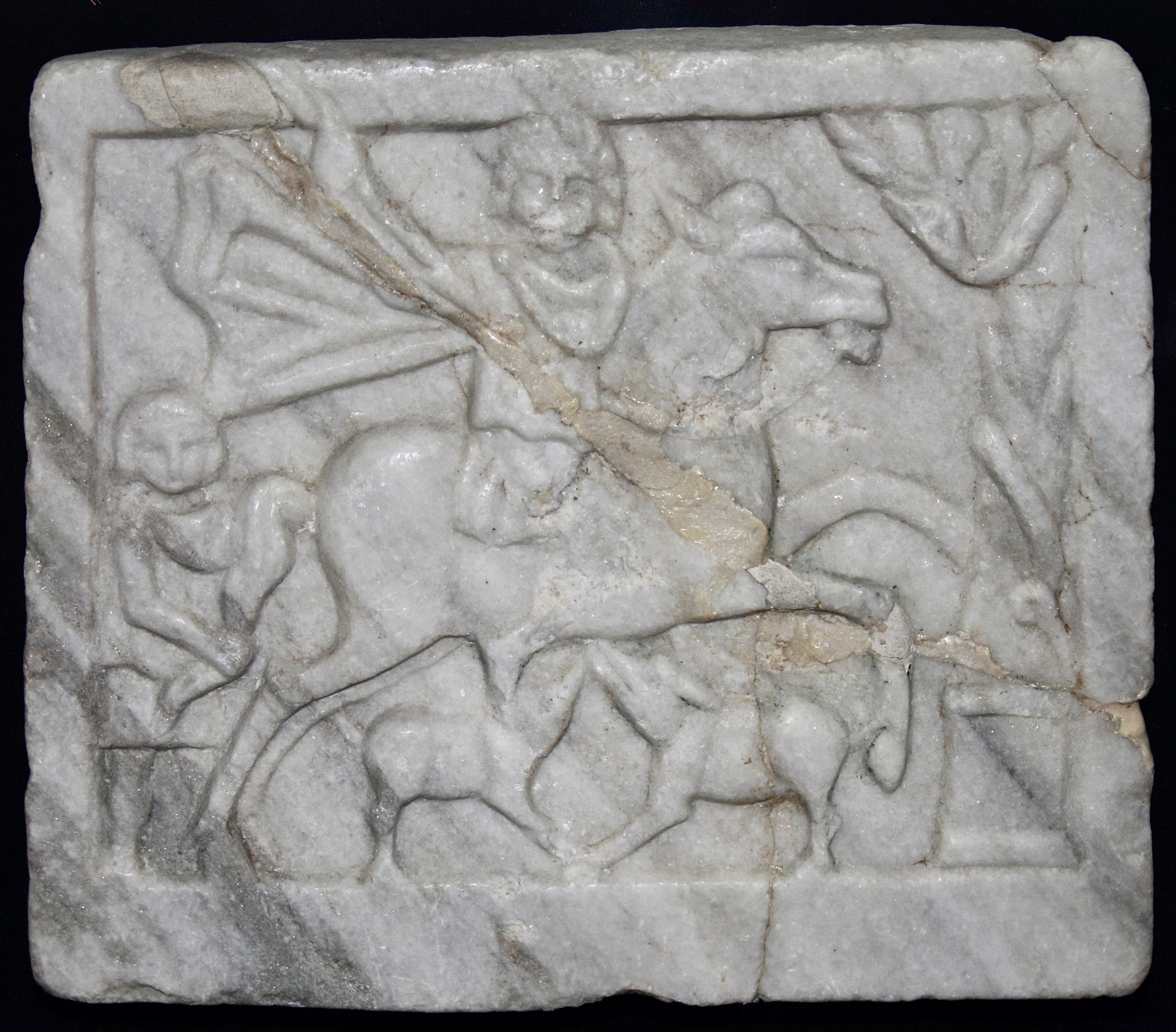
Thracian horseman with hounds, a serpent-entwined tree and a footman (3rd century), Constanța History and Archaeology Museum

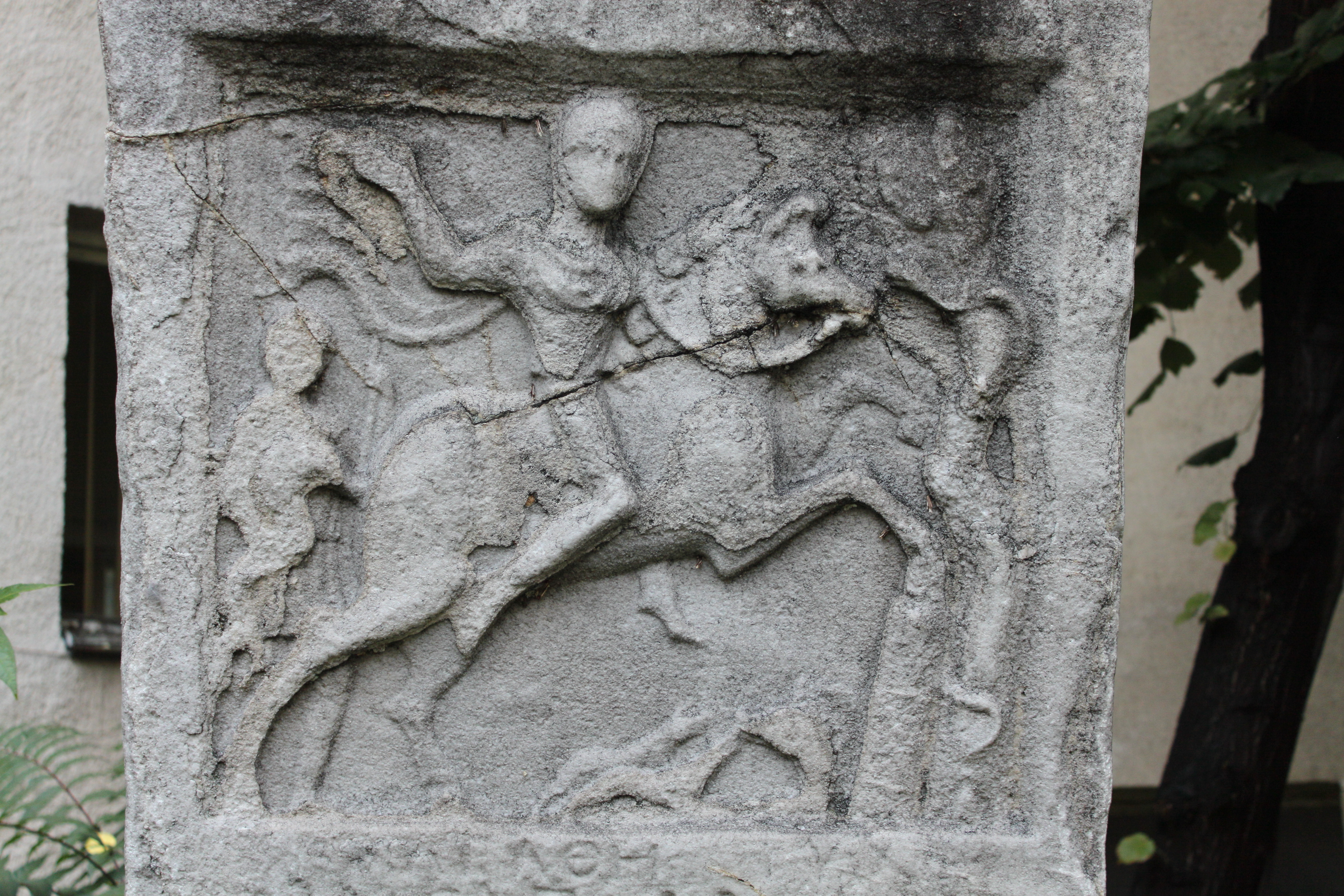
Thracian horseman with hounds, footman and tree, Haskovo Historic Museum, Bulgaria

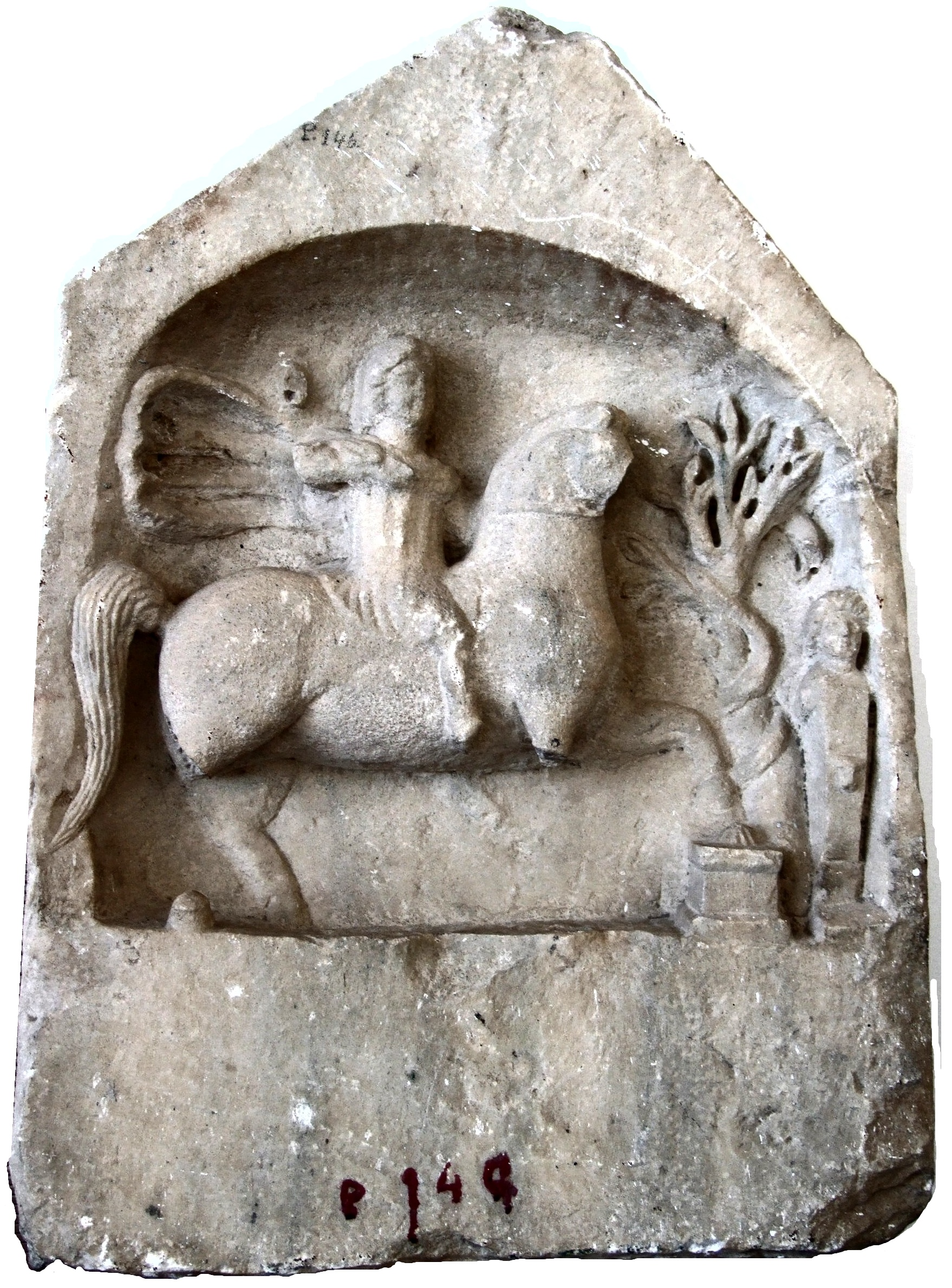
Thracian horseman with a serpent-entwined tree, Histria Museum, Romania

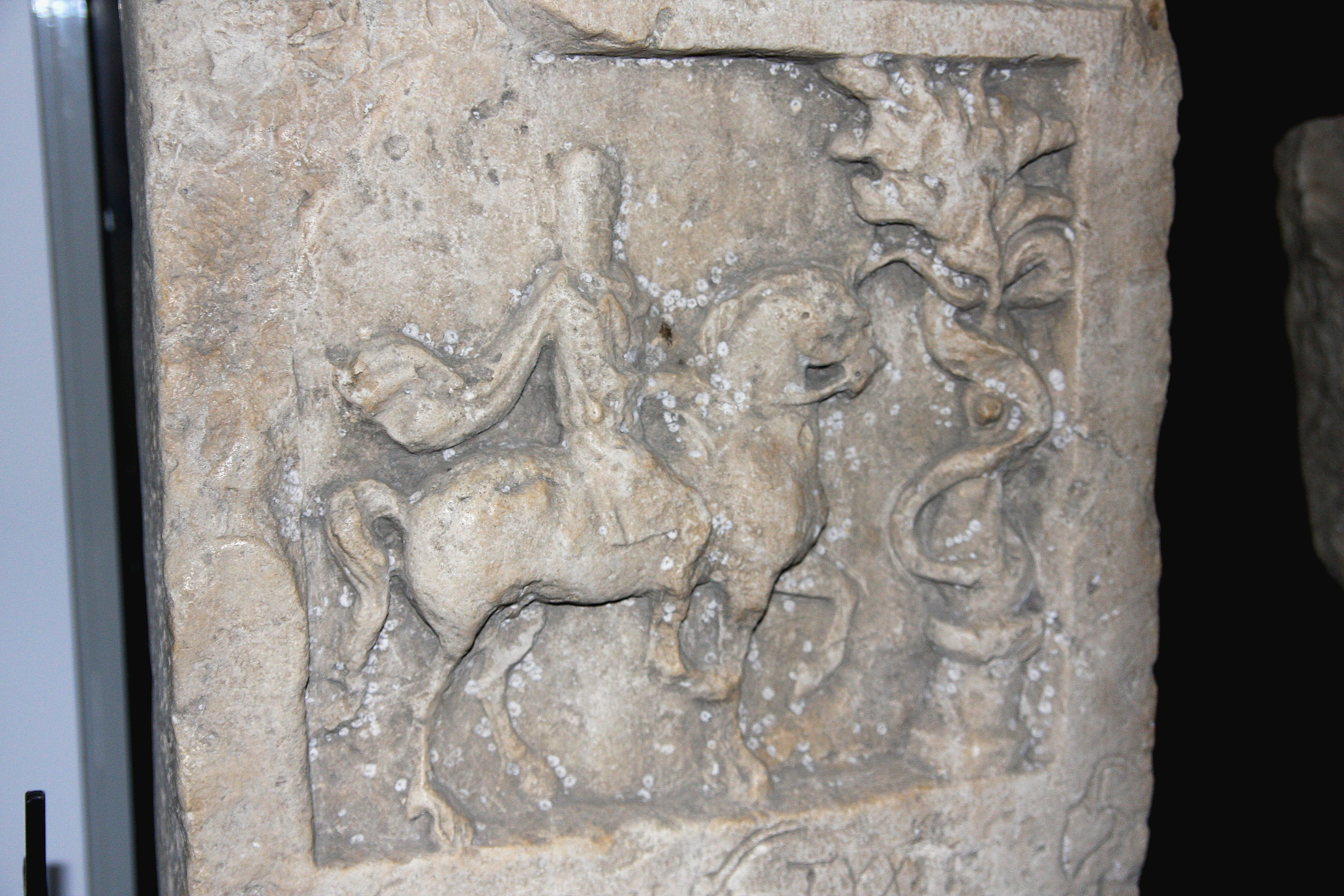
Thracian horseman with serpent-and-tree, the National History Museum of Bulgaria

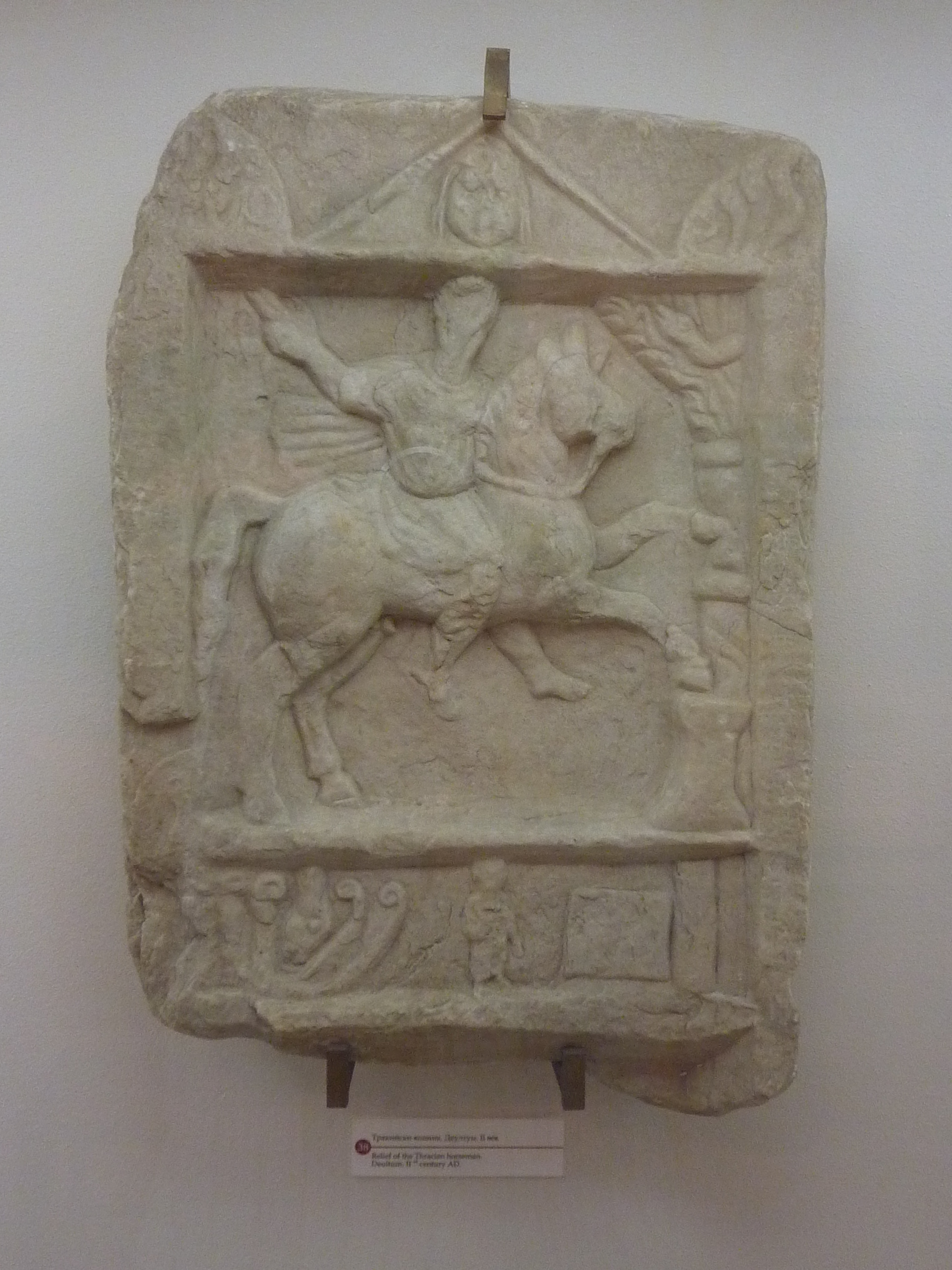
Thracian horseman with serpent-and-tree (2nd century), Burgas Archaeological Museum, Bulgaria

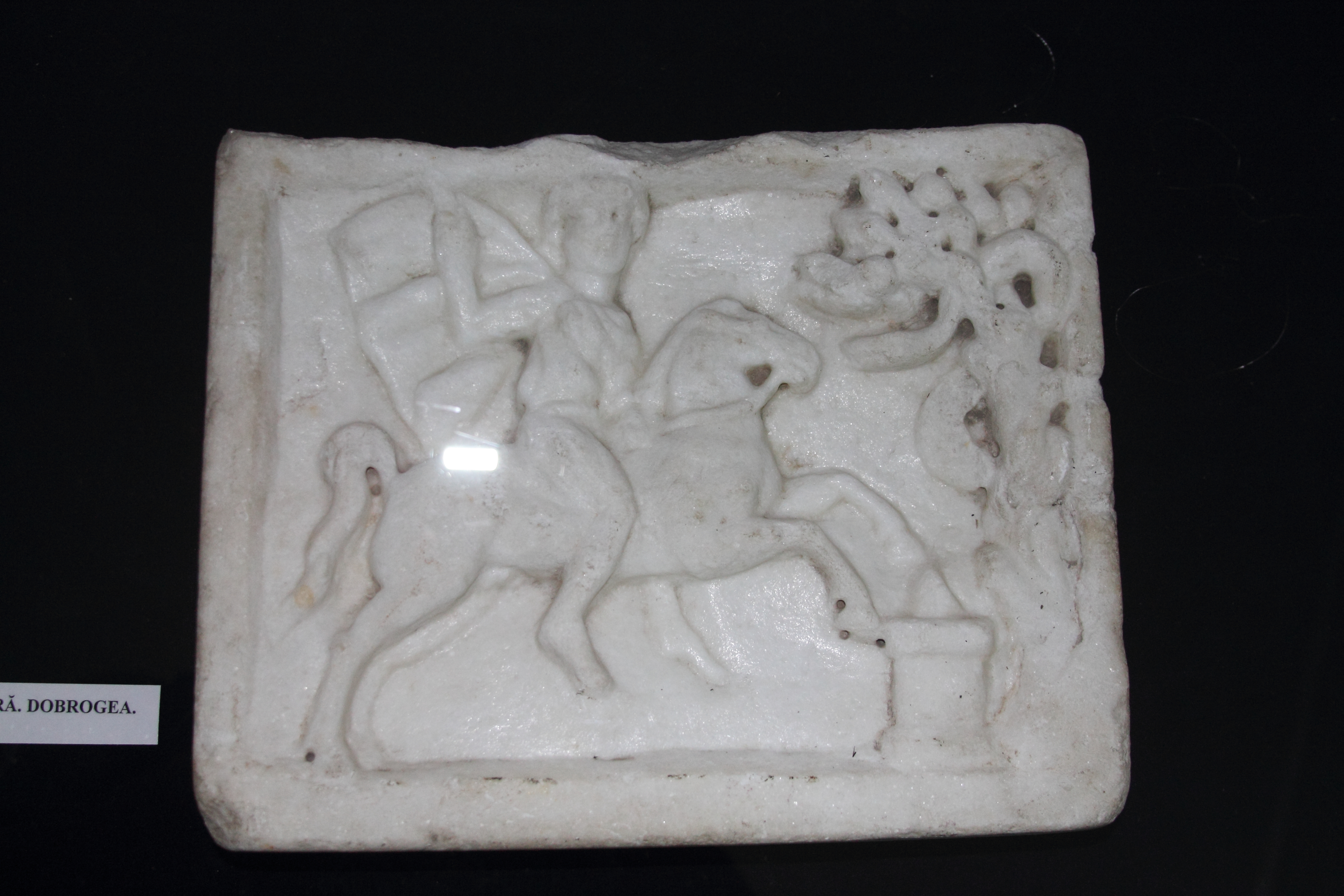
Thracian horseman with serpent-and-tree, Expoziţia Cultura Cucuteni
Rider and goddess

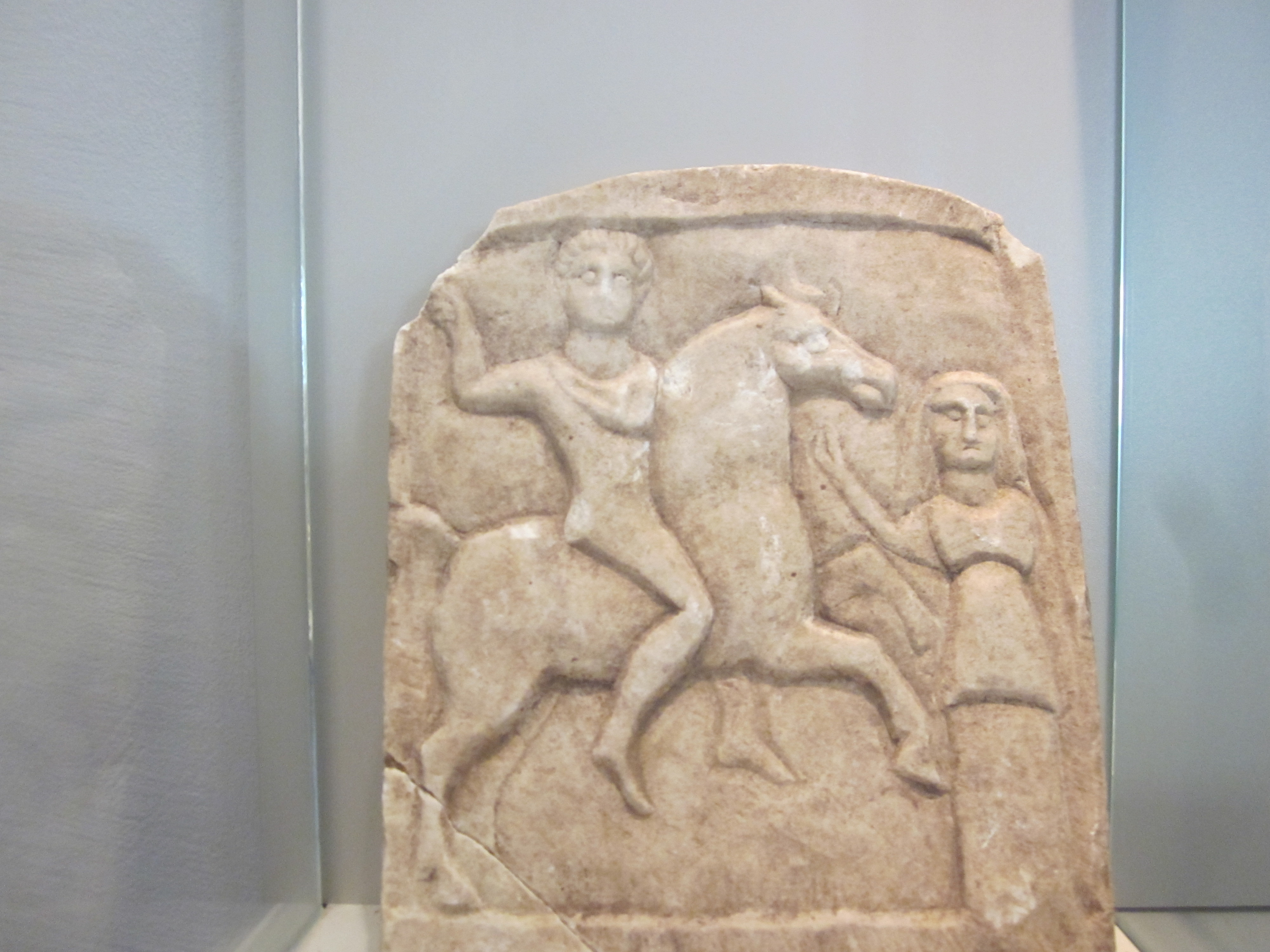
Thracian rider of "Scythian" type, with raised hand, riding towards female figure, Madara Museum, Bulgaria

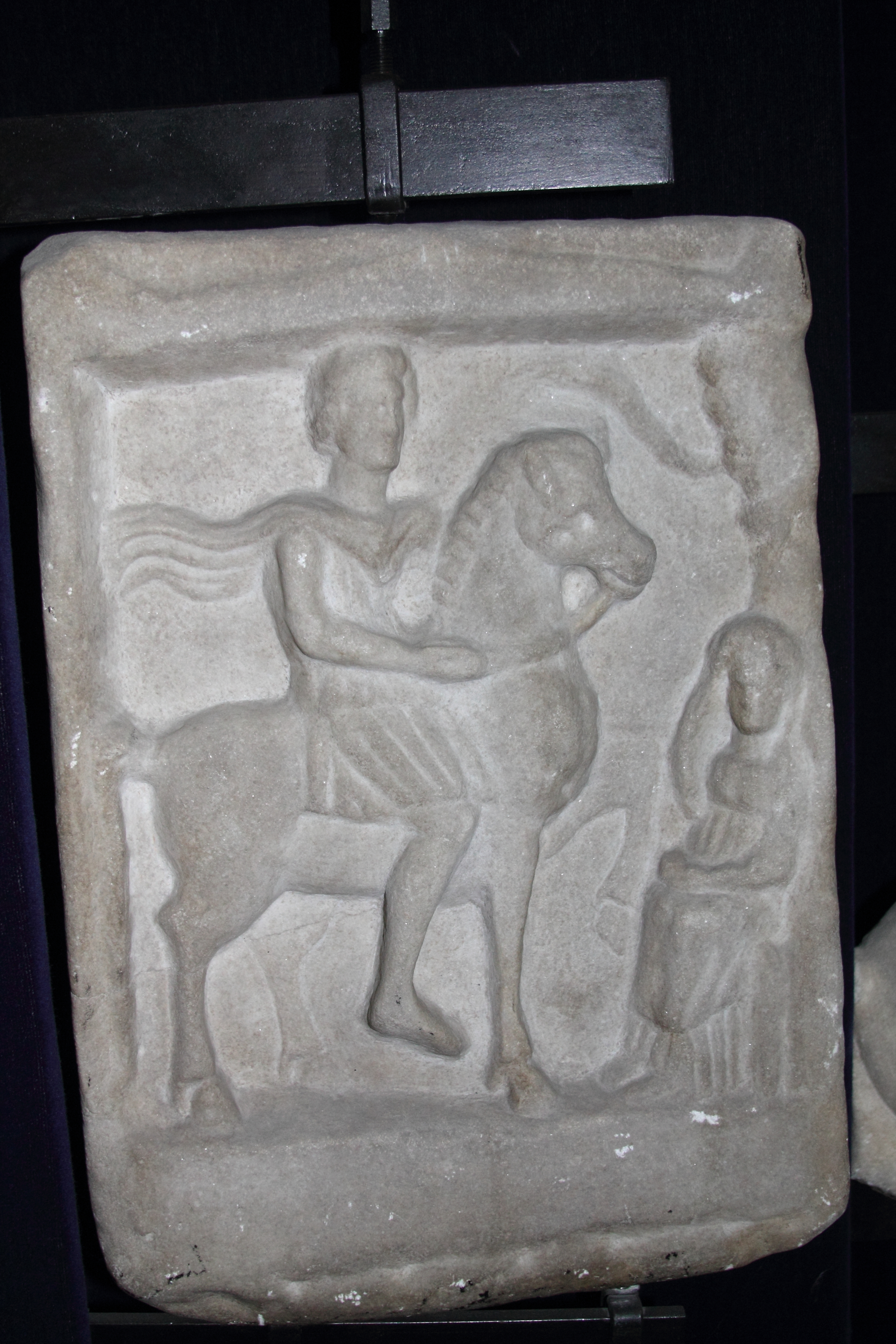
Horseman approaching seated female figure under a tree, Constanta Museum
Greco-Roman comparanda

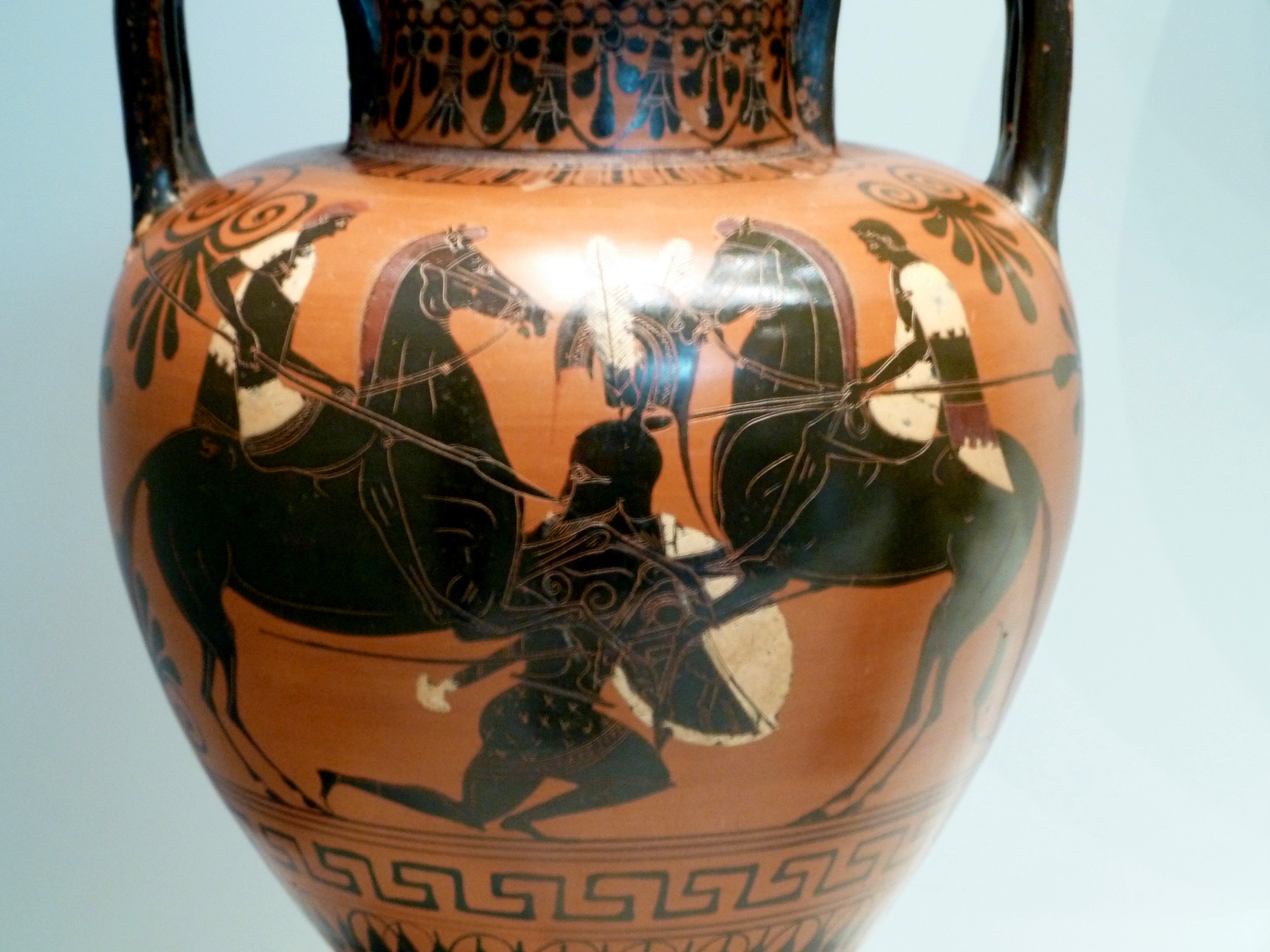
Black figure Thracian cavalrymen vs. armored Greek foot soldier (Getty Villa Collection, c. 520 BC)

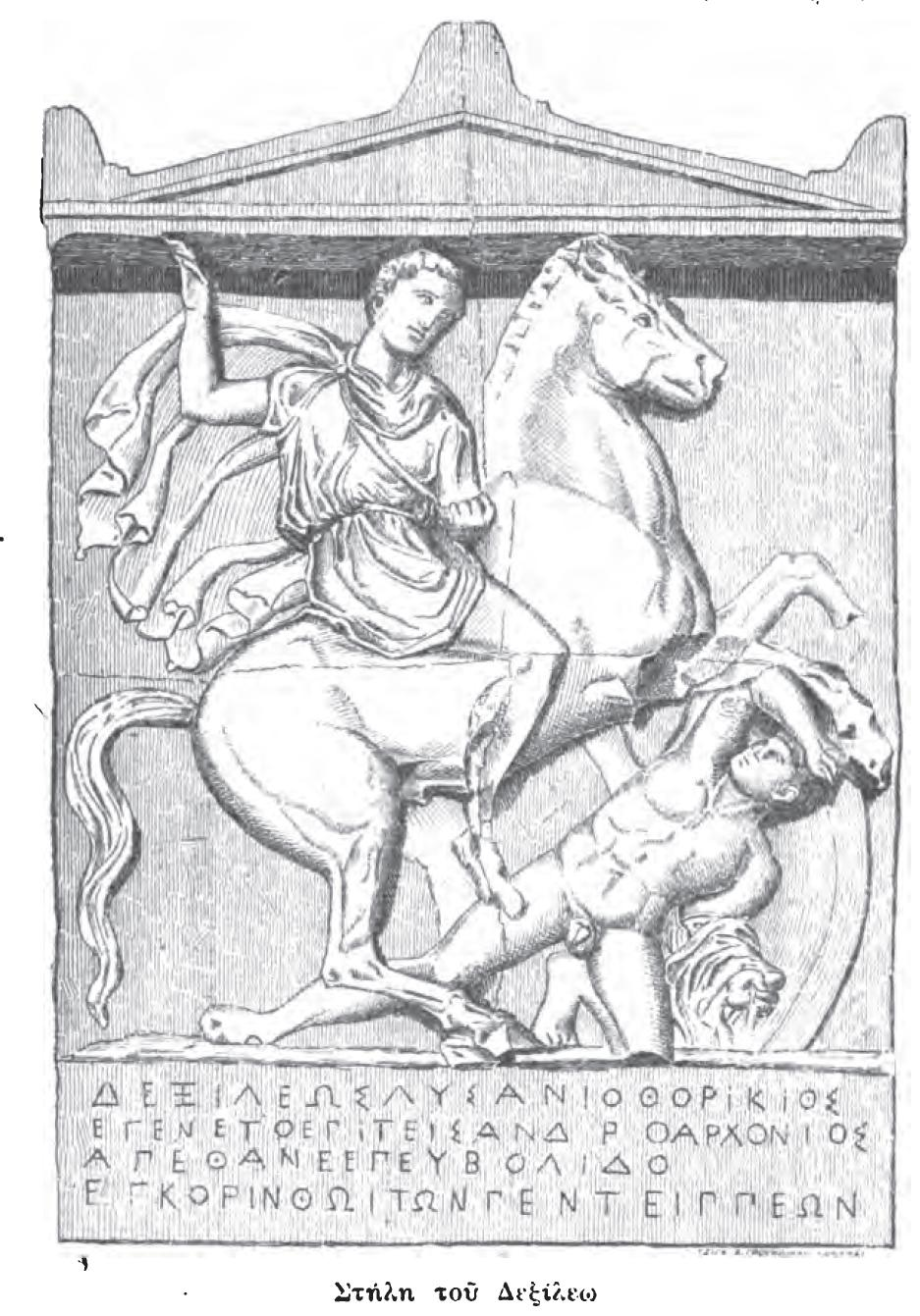
Stele of Dexileos (c. 390 BC)

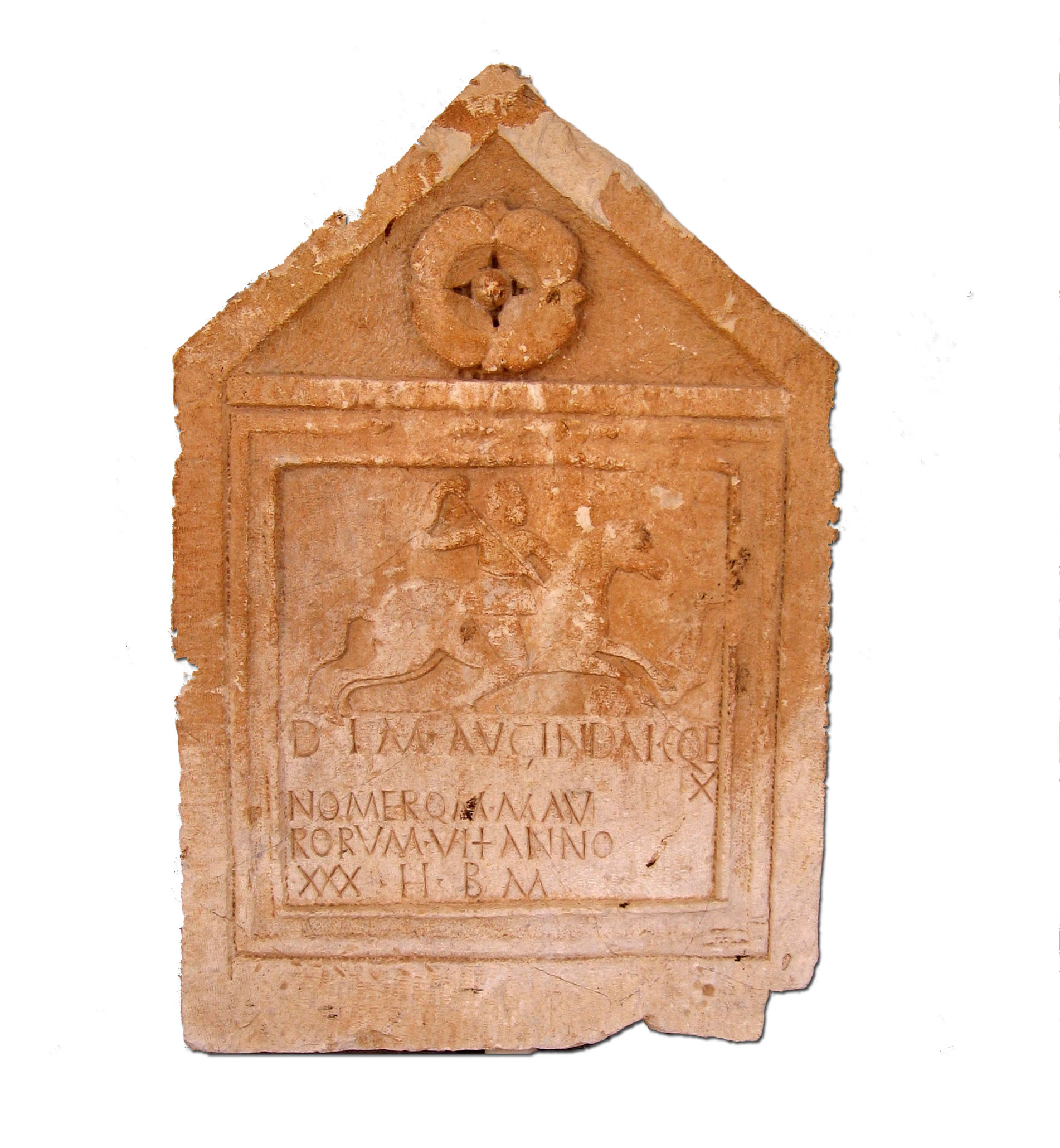
Funerary relief of a Roman cavalryman (2nd/3rd century)

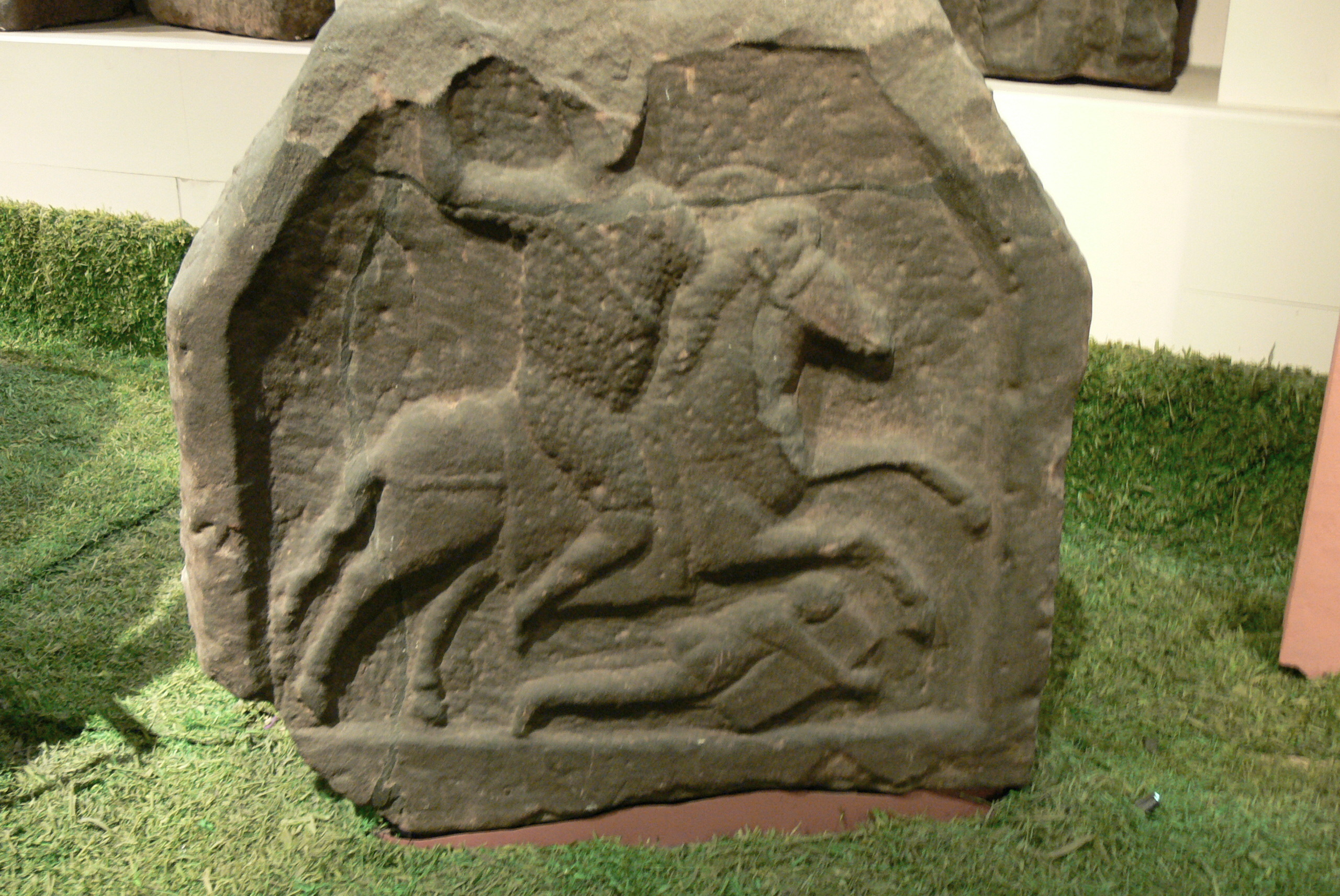
Funerary relief of a late (4th/5th century?) Roman cavalryman trampling a barbarian warrior, Roman Britain (Chester, Grosvenor Museum)

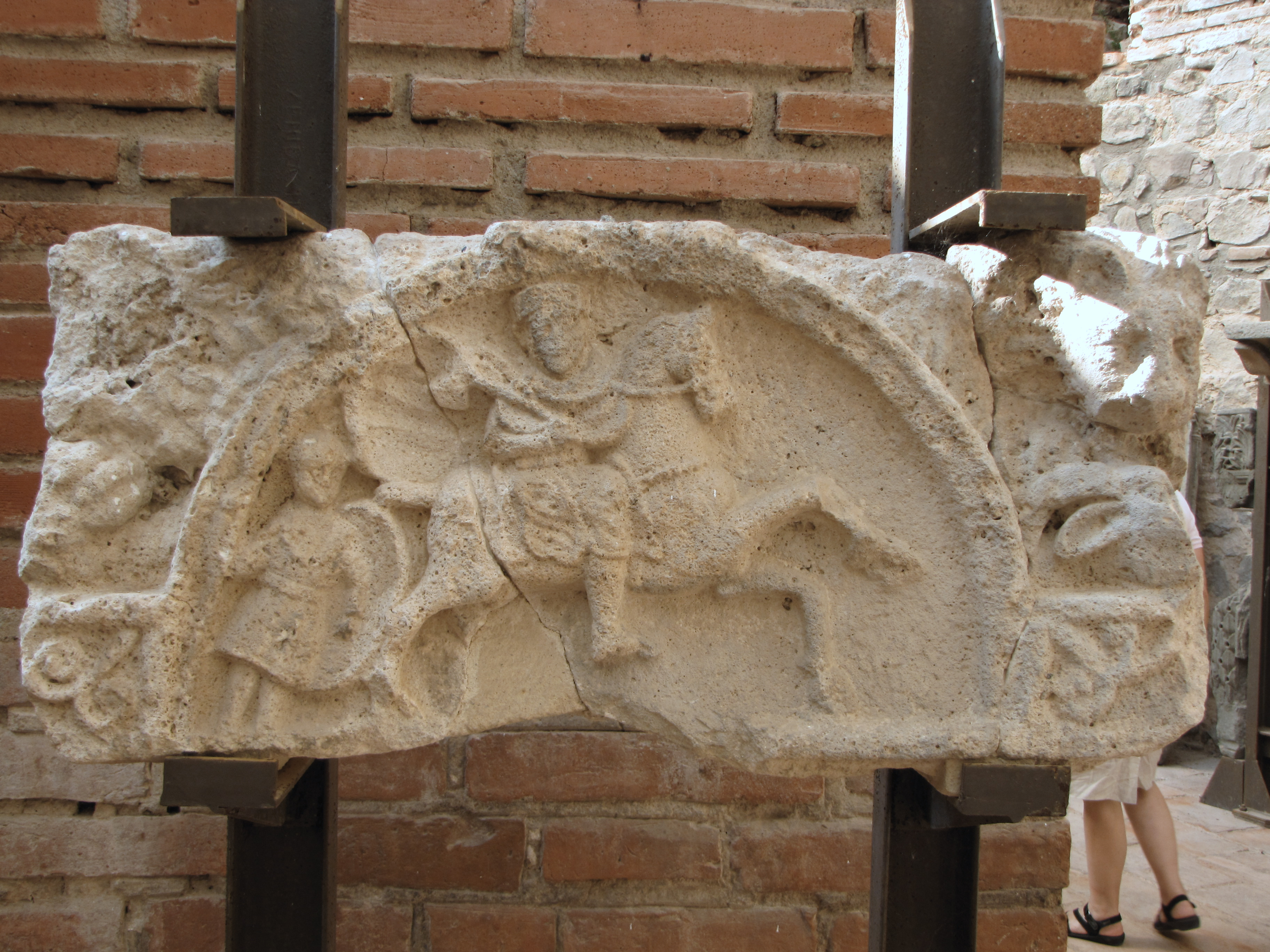
A fragment of a decorated frieze at Felix Romuliana, a palace built by the emperor Galerius in modern-day Serbia. The fragment depicts a rider wielding an ax, and a shield-bearing soldier on foot.

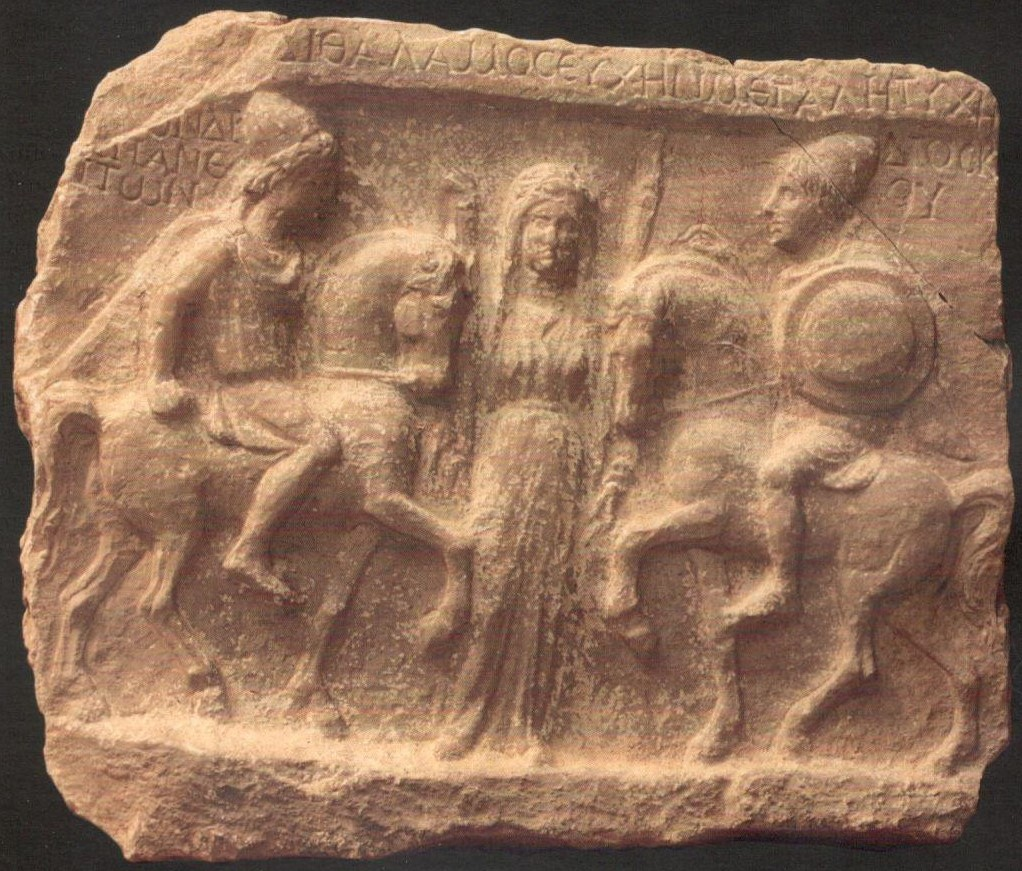
"Danubian Horsemen" (Artemis flanked by the Dioscuri), votive plate found in Demir Kapija, North Macedonia
Medieval comparanda

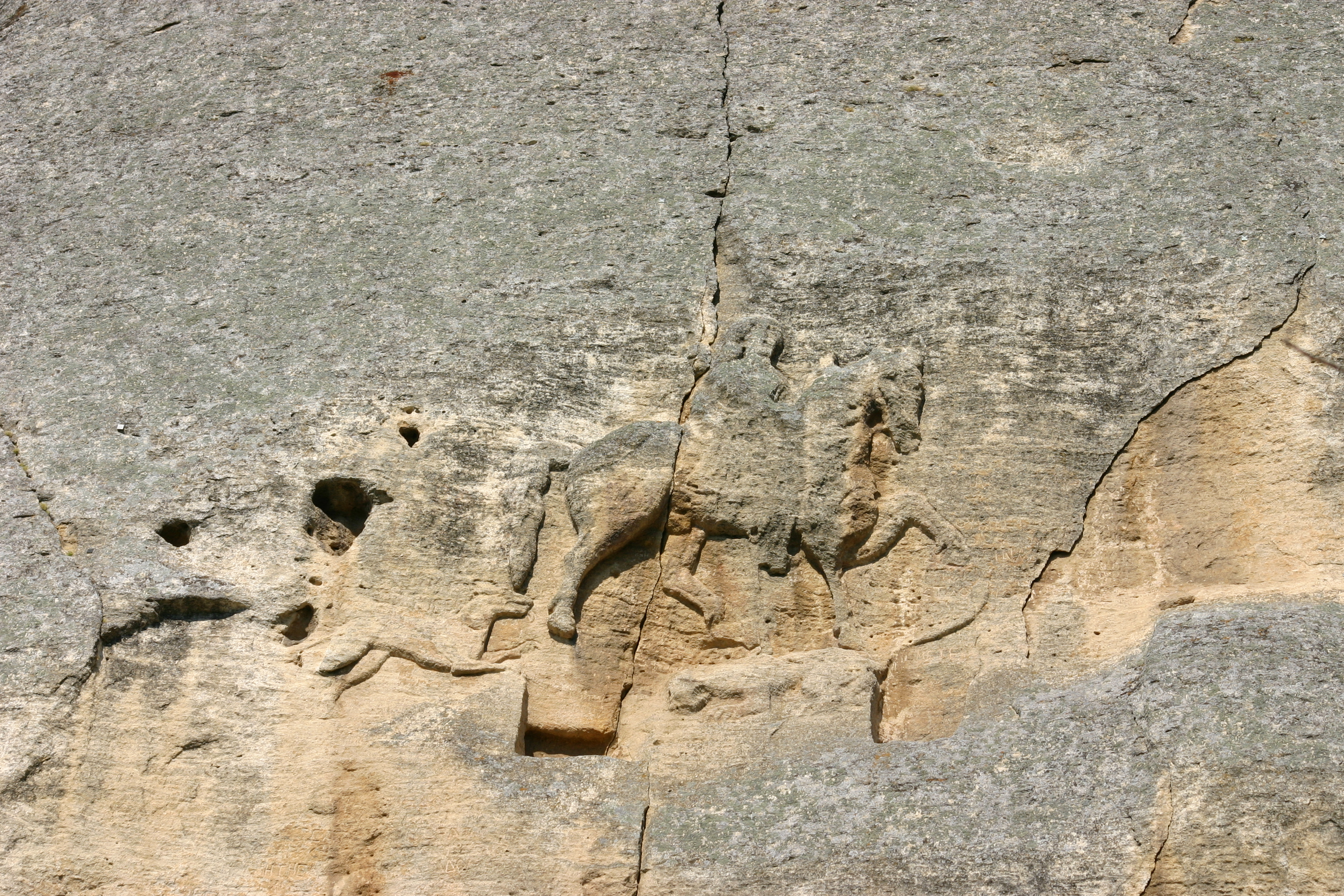
The Madara Rider, equestrian rock relief in Bulgaria (c. 700)

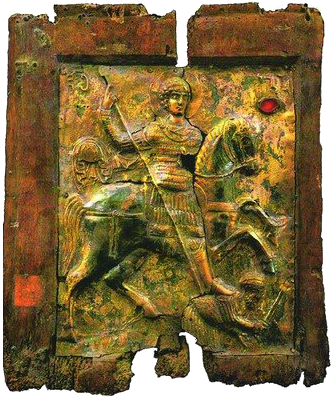
"St George of Labechina", Racha, Georgia (11th century), known as the oldest extant equestrian depiction of St George (but note that the horseman is trampling a human opponent rather than a dragon)

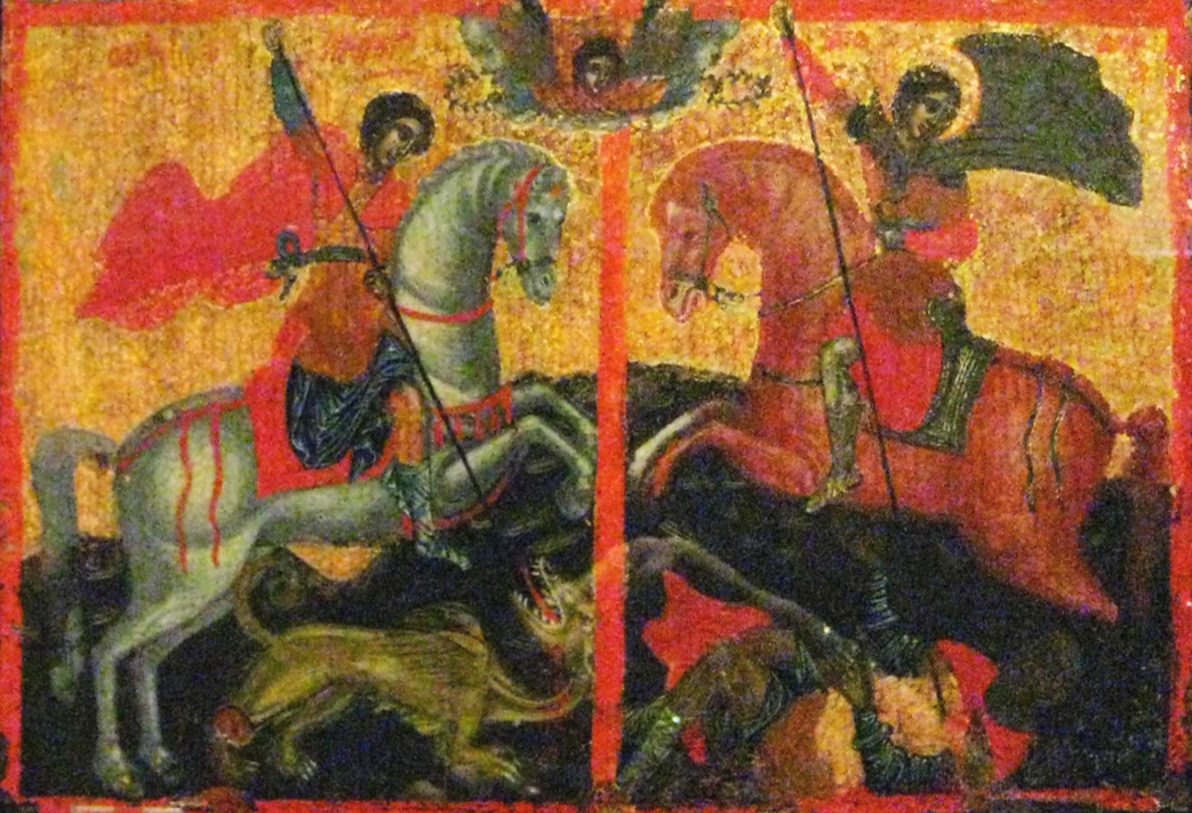
Equestrian depiction of Saints George and Demetrius

== See also ==
- Bellerophon
- Castor and Pollux, sometimes linked to the Danubian Rider.
- Heros Peninsula in Antarctica is named after the Thracian Horseman.
- Jupiter Column
- Medaurus
- Pahonia
- Sabazios
- Tetri Giorgi
- Uastyrdzhi
