= Medaurus =

Illyrian deity

Medaurus was the Illyrian guardian deity of the city of Risinium, and possibly a war god.

== Cult ==
Medaurus is mentioned in a dedication carved in Lambaesis by a Roman legatus native of Risinium (present-day Risan, Montenegro) and more scarcely in two other inscriptions found in Risinium and Santa Maria di Leuca (Lecce). The Lambaesis inscriptions are today lost, and the only remaining copies were made in the 19th century by the Polish Légion Étrangère soldier Joseph Konarzewski and the French historian Léon Renier.

The temple of Medaurus was located near the temples of Asclepius and Salus, erected ca. 161–162. The Lambaesis inscription was however not found in the temple of Asclepius, as it was initially thought due to imprecise indications given by Renier. The hypothesis of Medaurus as a god of medicine, often encountered in 20th-century studies, is therefore less certain. A fourth mention in a Vandal text from Africa, that could accredit the thesis of the medical god, is also unlikely, as it probably refers instead to the city of Madauros in Numidia.

== Interpretation ==
Medaurus is depicted as riding on horseback and carrying a javelin. As the protector of Risinium, it is possible that Medaurus was regarded as a war god. Dyczek et al. indeed note that a rise in religiosity has been later observed in the Danubian regions threatened by Germanic tribes during the Migration Period (375–568), especially the cult of Jupiter Depulsor repelling the enemies. Medaurus could have had a similar function among Illyrian soldiers fighting far from their home around the Roman limes.

The Lambaesis dedication also indicates that an equestrian statue of Medaurus had been erected in Lambaesis (North Africa), likely the replica of a monumental statue located in Risinium. Archaeological research in the 2010s in Risinium suggested that the statue of Medaurus was placed on a base of at least 15x20m, and situated on the acropolis where it dominated the city.

== Epigraphy ==
=== Lambaesis inscription ===
The author of the Lambaesis dedication is an unknown legatus from the Legio III Augusta (in service from 178? to 180) who participated in the Marcomannic Wars with the Roman emperor Marcus Aurelius, and was eventually nominated Consul. The dedication was engraved in two different times, as the author claims to have obtained the Consulship in the last 4 lines. The lacunas in the text are likely due to a damnatio memoriae, his name removed from the inscription as a punishment for a fault.

Lambaesis inscription	English translation
Moenia qui Risinni Aeacia, qui colis arcem Delmatiae, nostri publice Lar populi, Sancte Medaure domi et sancte hic iam, templa quoque ista Vise, precor, parua magnus in effigia, Succussus laeua sonipes cui surgit in auras, Altera dum telum librat ab aure manus. Talem te consul iam designatus in ista Sede locat uenerans ille tuus [lacuna] Notus Gradiuo belli uetus ac tibi, Caesar Marce, in primore rarus ubique acie.	You who live in the Aeacian city of Risinium, in the Citadel of Dalmatia, you, common god of our people, Medaurus, sacred at home and sacred here, visit also These temples, I pray to you, great in a small image, With your left hand urging on the horse, which rises into the air, While your other hand hurls death from beside the ear. You − so great − the already designated consul, your [lacuna] Put, worshipping, in this location, Long known to the Mars of war and even to you Caesar Marcus, famous everywhere in the first line of battle.
Adepto consulatu [lacuna] Tibi respirantem faciem patrii numinis, Hastam eminus quae iaculat refreno ex equo, Tuus, Medaure, dedicat Medaurius.	Having obtained the consulship [lacuna] To you, the breathing appearance of home divinity, Who from a distance throws a spear from the held-back horse, To you Medaurus, your Medaurian dedicates this spear.

=== Other inscriptions ===
	Other inscriptions	Notes
Second Lambaesis inscription	Medauro Aug(usto) sacrum	Likely a fragment from an altar.
Risinium inscription	Μεδαύρου	A dedication engraved by the Peripolarchoi, the border guards of the city.
Santa Maria di Leuca inscription	I(oui) O(ptimo) M(aximo) C(aius) Cordius Aqu(i)llinus uot(um) sol(uit) cum pleroma(t)e Rhedo[n]is et Med[d]auri.	A dedication engraved by Caius Cordius Aquillinus, where Medaurus is the divine name given to a merchant ship.

== See also ==
- Illyrian mythology
- Thracian horseman

== Bibliography ==
- Ceka, Neritan (2013). The Illyrians to the Albanians. Tirana: Migjeni. ISBN 9789928407467.
- Dyczek, Piotr; Kolendo, Jerzy; Łajtar, Adam; Plóciennik, Tomasz; Rzepkowski, Krzysztof (2014). "Une inscription métrique de Lambaesis (CIL, VIII, 2581; F. Buecheler, Carmina Latina epigraphica, 1527) et la statue du dieu illyrien Médaure". Antiquités Africaines. 50 (1): 73–84. doi:10.3406/antaf.2014.1560.
- Wilkes, J. J. (1995), The Illyrians, Oxford, United Kingdom: Blackwell Publishing, ISBN 0-631-19807-5
