= Rhizon =

Capital of the Illyrian kingdom under the Ardiaei

Rhizon was the capital of the Illyrian kingdom under the Ardiaei. During the Roman rule it was known as Rhizinium. Rhizon is the oldest settlement in the Bay of Kotor and the modern town of Risan (modern Montenegro) stands near the old city.

Originally it was an Illyrian settlement that developed gradually and became the capital of the Illyrian Ardiaean Kingdom under Agron and Teuta. It was the last stronghold of queen Teuta in the first Illyrian war against the Romans. It maintained its status as a significant regional settlement well into the Roman era.

== Name ==
Originally in Illyrian proper territory, the city is attested in Ancient Greek as Ῥίζων and in Latin as Risinium. The toponym has been compared with Albanian: rrjedh, meaning 'flow', 'stream', deriving from Proto-Indo-European *(H)reǵ- 'flow', whence in turn meaning 'river', 'stream', etc.

== History ==
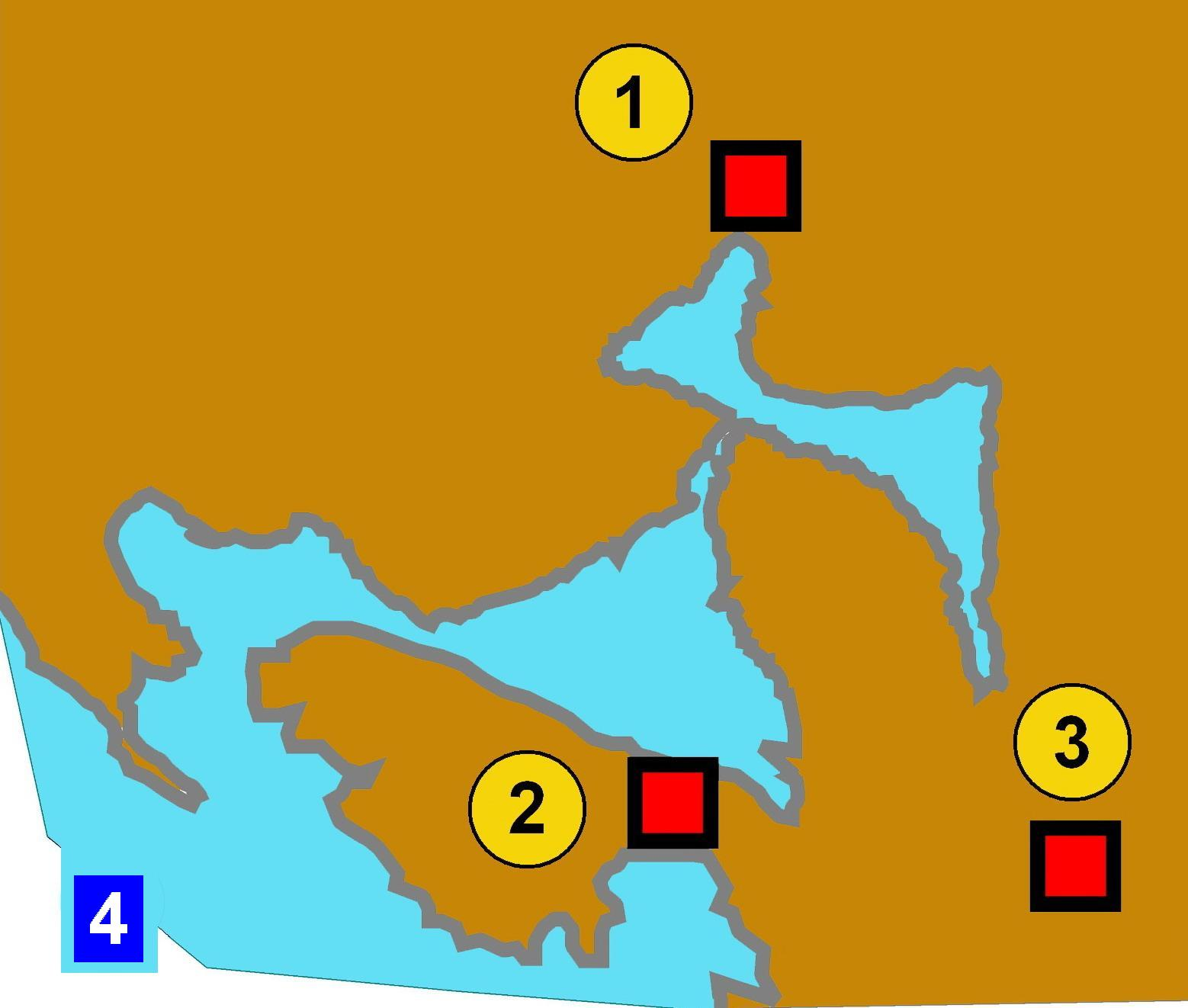
Rhizon (marked 1) was one of three Illyrian fortresses on the hills overlooking Bay of Kotor, and became the capital of the Illyrian Ardiaean Kingdom under Agron and Teuta.

Herodian (2nd century A.D.) mentions that Rhizon takes its name from Rizon, son of Cadmus and brother of Illyrius. The earliest mention of Rhizon dates back to the 4th century BCE in the Periplus of Pseudo-Scylax who mentions it as a settlement of the Enchelei. It later developed as a settlement of another Illyrian tribe, the Ardiaei. Rhizon had been the main fortress in the Illyrian state under Agron where Queen Teuta took refuge during the Illyrian Wars. During the short reign of the Illyrian Queen Teuta, Rhizon became the capital of her state.

During these periods a mint was established that issued several coinages:

- autonomous coinages of the town, in bronze,
- the royal coinage of king Ballaios, in silver and bronze,
- most probably, the coinage labeled “Coinage from the Rhizonian Gulf”, which has been considered as the coinage of an alliance in which Rhizon played a part, in silver and bronze.

The chronology of these coinages is still not defined with precision, primarily because the historical background of their issuance remains little known. There is hardly any mention in the literary sources of the town of Rhizon, and none of the king Ballaios. However, several features of these coinages - such as the characteristics of style, elements of inscription and iconography (especially the presence of the title “basileus” on the coinage of Ballaios, and the presence of a Macedonian shield on the “Coinage from the Rhizonian Gulf”), metrology, choice of coined metals, etc. – point to the 3rd and 2nd centuries BCE as the general chronological framework for the activity of the Rhizonian mint and for the successive issuance of the coinages of different issuing authorities there. A 2010 excavation unearthed about 4656 coins from the mint of Ballaios, which confirmed the status of the city as that of his royal mint.

Formerly the Bay of Kotor was known as Sinus Rhizonicus and Rhizonic Gulf (Ancient Greek: Ῥιζονικὸς κόλπος) after the (Greek) name of Rhizon, the leading town in anticity of the bay. Rhizon had also its own protector, a deity called Medaurus, who was depicted as carrying a lance and riding on horseback. Prior to Roman control in the region, the degree of Hellenistic acculturation at Rhizon was very high.

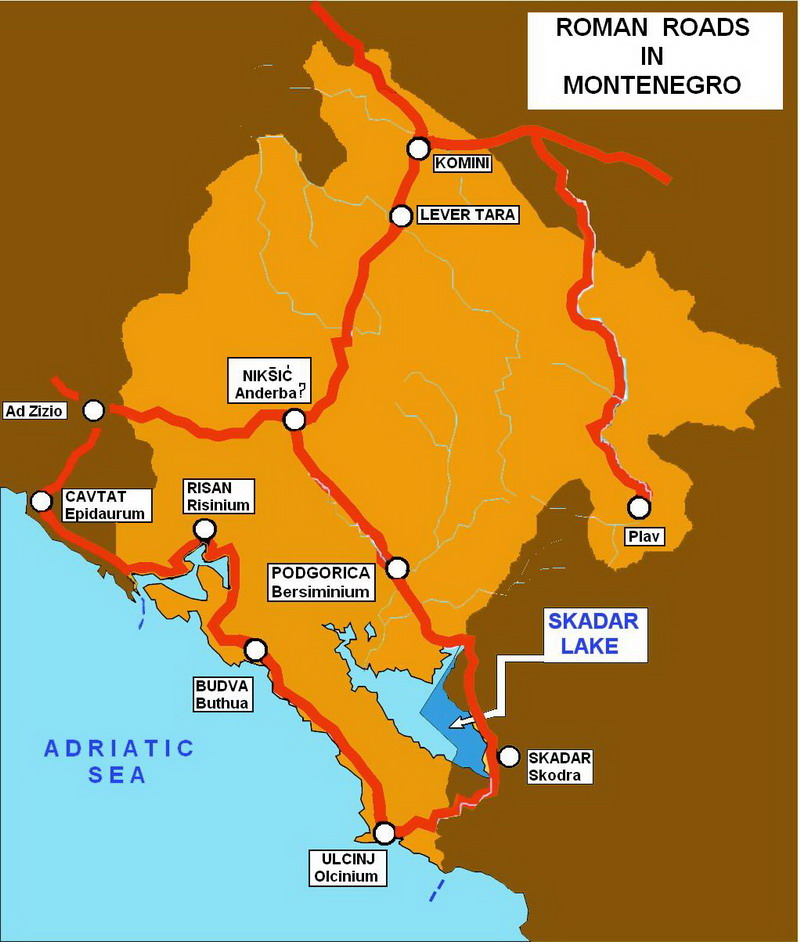
Roman roads in Montenegro, showing Rhizinium

In Roman times, Rhizinium is documented as an oppidum civium Romanorum. Two Roman routes led through the Bay of Kotor. The most prosperous time for Roman Rhizinium came during the 1st and 2nd centuries, when huge villas were made in the area and the city had 10,000 inhabitants. Five mosaics are the most valuable remains of that period - not only for Risan but also for Montenegro. The best preserved one shows Hypnos, the Greek deity of sleep. It is the only known image of this kind in the Balkans. The famous archeologist Sir Arthur Evans led those initial excavations in 1885.

The protector-god of Rhizon/Risinium was the Illyrian war deity, Medaurus. Medaurus is mentioned in a dedication carved in Lambaesis (north Africa) by a Roman legatus native of Risinium and more scarcely in two other inscriptions found in Risinium and Santa Maria di Leuca (Lecce). The Lambaesis dedication also indicates that an equestrian statue of Medaurus had been erected there, likely the replica of a monumental statue located in Risinium. Archeological research in Risinium in the 21st century suggests that the statue of Medaurus was set up on a base of at least 15x20m, and situated on the acropolis where it dominated the city.

The invasions of the Avars and Slavs left the city deserted. The last reference of a bishop in Risan dates back to 595.

== Legacy ==
On the Gradina hill, above the archeological site of Carine, a fortification is situated containing remains of an Illyrian acropolis.

== Sources ==
- Dyczek, Piotr; Kolendo, Jerzy; Łajtar, Adam; Plóciennik, Tomasz; Rzepkowski, Krzysztof (2014). "Une inscription métrique de Lambaesis (CIL, VIII, 2581; F. Buecheler, Carmina Latina epigraphica, 1527) et la statue du dieu illyrien Médaure". Antiquités africaines. 50 (1): 73–84. doi:10.3406/antaf.2014.1560.
- Dyczek, Piotr (2020). "Rhizon – capital of the Illyrian kingdom – some remarks". In Krzysztof Jakubiak; Adam Lajtar (eds.). Ex Oriente Lux. Studies in Honour of Jolanta Młynarczyk. Wydawnictwa Uniwersytetu Warszawskiego. pp. 423–433.
- Šašel Kos, Marjeta (1993). "Cadmus and Harmonia in Illyria". Arheološki vestnik. 44.
- Savić, Danilo; Ligorio, Orsat (2022). "Illyrian and Slavic". Lucida Intervalla. 51. Beograd: Filozofski fakultet Univerziteta u Beogradu: 3–41. ISSN 1450-6645.
- Wilkes, John J. (1995). The Illyrians. Oxford: Blackwell Publishing. ISBN 0-631-19807-5.
