= USS SC-94 =

WWI US submarine chaser

History

United States Navy
- Name: USS Submarine Chaser No. 94 (1917-1919); USS SC-94 (1920, retrospectively)
- Builder: Electric Launch Company (Elco), Bayonne, New Jersey
- Commissioned: 24 December 1917
- Identification: NOGA
- Fate: Sold 1919
- Reclassified: SC-94 on 17 July 1920 (retrospectively)

General characteristics
- Class & type: SC-1-class submarine chaser
- Displacement: 77 tons normal; 85 tons full load
- Length: 110 ft (34 m) overall; 105 ft (32 m) between perpendiculars
- Beam: 14 ft 9 in (4.50 m)
- Draft: 5 ft 7 in (1.70 m) normal; 6 ft 6 in (1.98 m) full load
- Propulsion: Three 220 hp (164 kW) Standard Motor Construction Company six-cylinder gasoline engines, three shafts, 2,400 US gal (2,000 imp gal; 9,100 L) of gasoline; one Standard Motor Construction Company two-cylinder gasoline-powered auxiliary engine
- Speed: 18 knots (33 km/h; 21 mph)
- Range: 1,000 nmi (1,850 km; 1,150 mi) at 10 knots (19 km/h; 12 mph)
- Complement: 27 (2 officers, 25 enlisted men)
- Sensors & processing systems: One Submarine Signal Company S.C. C Tube, M.B. Tube, or K Tube hydrophone
- Armament: 1 × 3-inch (76.2-mm)/23-caliber gun mount; 2 × Colt .30 caliber (7.62-mm) machine guns; 1 × Y-gun depth charge projector

USS SC-94, prior to July 1920 known as USS Submarine Chaser No. 94 or USS S.C. 94, was an SC-1-class submarine chaser built for the United States Navy during World War I. She operated as part of the Otranto Barrage during the war.

== Construction and commissioning ==
SC-94 was a wooden-hulled 110-foot (34 m) submarine chaser built by the Electric Launch Company (Elco) at Bayonne, New Jersey. She was commissioned on 24 December 1917 as USS Submarine Chaser No. 94, abbreviated at the time as USS S.C. 94.

== Service history ==
=== World War I ===
Assigned to operate as part of the Otranto Barrage in the Strait of Otranto between Brindisi, Italy, and Corfu, S.C. 94 arrived at Corfu on 5 June 1918 as part of a convoy consisting of 21 submarine chasers and their mother ship, the former collier and survey ship USS Leonidas. Operating from Base 25, a newly constructed U.S. Navy submarine chaser base in a bay on the east side of Corfu northwest of the city of Corfu, she was assigned along with the submarine chasers USS S.C. 151 and USS S.C. 227 to Unit F of Squadron 1.

On the evening of 18 June 1918, Unit F was on an antisubmarine patrol in the Strait of Otranto when it became involved in a friendly fire incident. At 21:00, the submarine chasers′ hydrophones detected sounds which their crews assumed were coming from a submarine. The submarine chasers followed the sounds until 22:40, when they grew louder and the submarine chaser crews interpreted them as coming from a submarine on the surface. All three submarine chasers headed toward the source of the sound at flank speed and soon sighted the Royal Navy destroyers HMS Defender and HMS Nymphe, identifying them merely as two low-lying objects in the water which the submarine chaser crews believed were Central Powers submarines. The submarine chasers challenged the British destroyers with recognition signals flashed several times by blinker light. Defender and Nymphe did not respond, so the submarine chasers opened fire, with SC-94 firing two rounds and SC-151 firing one. One of SC-94′s shots hit Nymphe, severing a steam line and putting one of her steam engines out of commission. Defender and Nymphe immediately flashed lights at the submarine chasers, which ceased fire, went alongside the destroyers, and discovered their identities. When the submarine chaser crews asked why the destroyers had not answered the recognition signals, the crews of Defender and Nymphe replied that they had orders not to use recognition signals, a restriction unknown to the submarine chaser crews because of a lack of a unified Allied command in the area. Defender took Nymphe in tow, and the submarine chasers resumed their antisubmarine patrol. Discussing the incident in a letter to the British Admiralty, the commander of United States Naval Forces Operating in European Waters, Vice Admiral William Sims, wrote: "While it appears that, under attendant circumstances, the commanding officers of the submarine chasers were justified in opening fire on the destroyers, I nevertheless wish to express regret that the incident occurred, and that H.M.S. Nymphe should have sustained damage."

Beginning at 11:30 on 19 June 1919, Unit F and Unit G (made up of USS S.C. 95, USS S.C. 179, and USS S.C. 338) gained and lost sound contact on a submarine several times before Unit G finally attacked it with 16 depth charges at 40°24′N 019°00′E. After the attack, Unit G again made sound contact on the submarine, indicating that it had survived, but Unit G′s submarine chasers had expended all of their depth charges and therefore discontinued pursuit of it.

An armistice with Austria-Hungary went into effect on 3 November 1918, and World War I ended on 11 November 1918 with the armistice with Germany.

=== Post-war ===
By late October 1918, Austria-Hungary had begun to disintegrate, and its dissolution led to a requirement for Allied forces to maintain order along the Adriatic coast of what had been Austria-Hungary. As a result, on 15 November 1918, Unit F received orders to proceed to the island of Lissa in the Adriatic.

Not long afterward, SC-94 was decommissioned. She was sold in Italy in early 1919.

When the U.S. Navy adopted its modern hull number system on 17 July 1920, Submarine Chaser No. 209 retrospectively was classified as SC-209 and her name was shortened to USS SC-209.

== Honors and awards ==
- World War I Victory Medal with Submarine Chaser Clasp for the period 22 April–11 November 1918
