= HMS Nymphe (1911) =

Destroyer of the Royal Navy

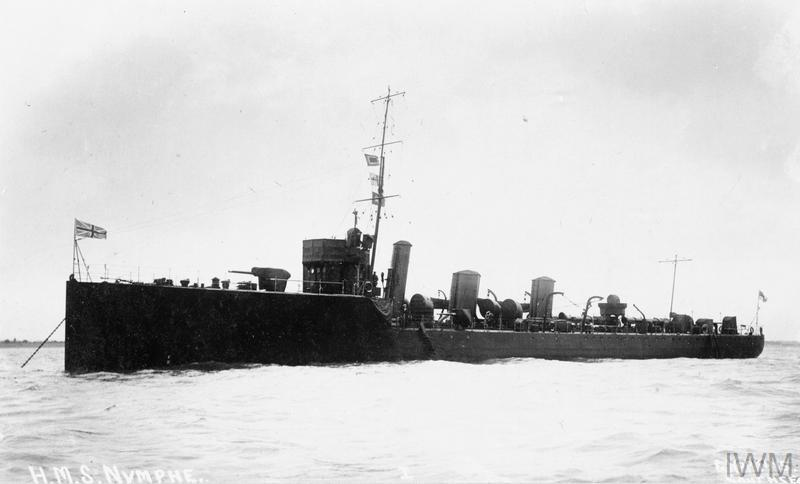

History

United Kingdom
- Name: Nymphe
- Namesake: An alternative spelling of nymph, a female nature deity in Ancient Greek folklore
- Builder: R. & W. Hawthorn, Leslie and Company, Hebburn
- Laid down: 8 December 1909
- Launched: 31 January 1911
- Completed: May 1911
- Fate: Sold to be broken up 9 May 1921

General characteristics (as built)
- Class & type: Acorn-class destroyer
- Displacement: 730 long tons (740 t) (normal); 855 long tons (869 t) (full load)
- Length: 246 ft (75 m) (o.a.); 240 ft (73 m) (p.p.)
- Beam: 25 ft 5 in (7.7 m)
- Draught: 8 ft 6 in (2.6 m)
- Installed power: 4 White-Forster boilers 13,500 shp (10,100 kW)
- Propulsion: Parsons steam turbines, 3 shafts
- Speed: 27 kn (50 km/h; 31 mph)
- Range: 1,540 nmi (2,850 km; 1,770 mi) at 15 kn (28 km/h; 17 mph)
- Complement: 72
- Armament: 2 × single BL 4 in (102 mm) guns; 2 × single QF 12 pdr 3 in (76 mm) gun; 2 × single 21 in (533 mm) torpedo tubes

HMS Nymphe was one of 20 Acorn-class (later H-class) destroyers built for the Royal Navy that served in the First World War. The Acorn class were smaller than the preceding Beagle class but oil-fired and better armed. Launched in 1911, the ship served with the 2nd Destroyer Flotilla, joining the Grand Fleet at the start of the war in 1914, and was transferred to Portsmouth in early 1916. She joined the 5th Destroyer Flotilla in the Mediterranean in 1918. She was placed in reserve in 1919 and was sold in 1921 to be broken up.

== Design and description ==
After the preceding coal-burning Beagle class, the Acorn-class destroyer saw a return to oil-firing. Pioneered by the Tribal class of 1905 and HMS Swift of 1907, using oil enabled a more efficient design, leading to a smaller vessel which also had increased deck space available for weaponry. Unlike previous destroyer designs, where the individual yards had been given discretion within the parameters set by the Admiralty, the Acorn class were a set, with the propulsion machinery the only major variation between the different ships. This enabled costs to be reduced. The class was later renamed H class.

Nymphe had a length of 240 feet (73 m) between perpendiculars and 246 ft (75 m) overall, with a beam of 25 ft 5 in (7.7 m) and a deep draught of 8 ft 6 in (2.6 m). Displacement was 730 long tons (820 short tons; 740 tonnes) normal and 855 long tons (869 t) full load. Power was provided by Parsons steam turbines fed by four White-Forster boilers and driving three shafts. Three funnels were fitted, the foremost tall and thin, the central short and thick and the aft narrow. The engines were rated at 13,500 shaft horsepower (10,100 kW) which gave a design speed of 27 knots (50 km/h; 31 mph). On trial, Nymphe achieved 28.7 knots (53.2 km/h; 33.0 mph). The vessel carried 170 long tons (170 t) of fuel oil which gave a range of 1,540 nautical miles (2,850 km; 1,770 mi) at a cruising speed of 15 kn (28 km/h; 17 mph).

Armament consisted of two single BL 4 in (102 mm) Mk VIII guns, one carried on the forecastle and another aft. Two single QF 12-pounder 3 in (76 mm) guns were mounted between the first two funnels. Two rotating 21-inch (533 mm) torpedo tubes were mounted aft of the funnels, with two reloads carried, and a searchlight fitted between the tubes. The destroyer was later modified to carry a single Vickers QF 3-pounder 2 in (47 mm) anti-aircraft gun and depth charges for anti-submarine warfare. The ship's complement was 72 officers and ratings.

== Construction ==
The 20 destroyers of the Acorn class were ordered by the Admiralty under the 1909–1910 Naval Programme. One of three in the class sourced from R. & W. Hawthorn, Leslie and Company, Nymphe was laid down at the company's Hebburn shipyard on 8 December 1909 with yard number 1315 and launched on 31 January 1911. The ship was completed in May 1911, the seventh ship in Royal Navy service to be named for the nymph, and the sixth to use the variant spelling "nymphe."

== Service history ==
=== 1911–1914 ===
On commissioning in 1911, Nymphe joined the rest of the Acorn-class destroyers in the 2nd Destroyer Flotilla, an element of the 2nd Division of the Home Fleet. Nymphe and her sister ships Acorn, Alarm, Larne, Lyra, Nemesis, and Rifleman conducted high-speed trials in the Atlantic Ocean off Berehaven, Ireland, on 1 July 1911 and all achieved 28 knots (52 km/h; 32 mph) despite rough weather. All suffered damage, however, and by the time they reached Portsmouth, England, on 4 July 1911, they all were leaking and had water in their fuel oil bunkers, requiring repair by divers. Nymphe suffered the greatest damage, with flooding in her magazines as well, ruining her ammunition. On 16 October 1911, a 6-pounder gun aboard Nymphe burst during night-firing exercises off Weymouth, England, slightly injuring one officer.

The 2nd Destroyer Flotilla was transferred to the First Fleet in 1912. In late April 1914, Nymphe and two other destroyers patrolled in Dundrum Bay, County Down, on the coast of Ireland to interdict the smuggling of weapons into Ireland. In July 1914, Nymphe was one of 20 destroyers in the First Fleet's Second Flotilla.

=== World War I ===
World War I began on 28 July 1914, and the United Kingdom entered the war on the side of the Allies on 4 August 1914. With the outbreak of war, the First Fleet became the Grand Fleet.

At 10:30 on 15 October 1914, the Imperial German Navy submarine U-9 torpedoed and sank the protected cruiser HMS Hawke in the North Sea off Aberdeen, Scotland. Nymphe and the destroyers Alarm, Lyra, and Nemesis put to sea that day to patrol in the eastern approaches to Scapa Flow. At about 13.30 Nymphe sighted U-9′s periscope, alerted the other destroyers, and steered to ram U-9. Nymphe′s ramming attempt failed. U-9 fired a torpedo which missed Nymphe′s bow by an only a few feet before passing down her starboard side, then passed in front of Nemesis and forced Alarm to take evasive action by making a hard turn to port.

Nymphe accompanied the Grand Fleet when it put to sea for exercises on 15 March 1915. Operating in heavy seas, she soon collided with Nemesis, and the fleet's destroyers received orders to return to port because of the bad weather.

In February 1916, Nymphe was the last Acorn-class destroyer operating with the Grand Fleet, and by March 1916 she had left the fleet and was based at Portsmouth. In May 1916 she was serving as a temporary tender to the shore establishment HMS Vernon, the Royal Navy Torpedo School at Portsmouth. From July to November 1916 she was part of the Portsmouth Local Defence Flotilla, also known as the Port Defence Flotilla. During the night of 7–8 December 1916, she came to the assistance of the merchant ship SS Conch, which had been carrying a cargo of benzene when the German submarine UB-23 torpedoed her off St Alban's Head. Nymphe found Conch engulfed by a massive fire and rescued her chief engineer and some other members of her crew.

Nymphe served with the Paravane Department at Portsmouth from January 1917 to February 1918, developing the paravane as a weapon for use against submarines and naval mines. She was listed as part of the Portsmouth Escort Flotilla in January 1917 and the Portsmouth Local Defence Flotilla in June 1917 while performing her paravane work.

On 17 May 1917, Nymphe came to the defence of the British steamer Florence Louise. The German submarine UB-40 had stopped Florence Louise in the English Channel and ordered her crew to abandon ship so that she could sink Florence Louise. Florence Louise′s crew had already taken to the lifeboats when Nymphe arrived and forced UB-40 to submerge. Florence Louise′s crew returned to their ship and resumed their voyage unescorted. A few hours later, UB-40 again stopped her, ordered her crew to abandon ship again, and sank her with explosive charges.

Nymphe suffered an internal explosion while operating in the English Channel on 9 July 1917. The explosion killed four members of her crew and injured a fifth man who later died of his injuries.

Nymphe served another tour as tender for HMS Vernon in March and April 1918. She then was assigned to service in the Mediterranean, where she rejoined the rest of the Acorn class when she became poart of the 5th Destroyer Flotilla in May 1918.

On the evening of 18 June 1918, Nymphe became the victim of a friendly fire incident while on patrol with the destroyer HMS Defender in the Strait of Otranto. Also in the area was a unit of three United States Navy submarine chasers — USS SC-94, USS SC-151, and USS SC-227 — on an antisubmarine patrol. At 21:00, the submarine chasers′ hydrophones detected sounds which their crews assumed were coming from a submarine. The submarine chasers followed the sounds until 22:40, when they grew louder and the submarine chaser crews interpreted them as coming from a submarine on the surface. All three submarine chasers headed toward the source of the sound at flank speed and soon sighted Nymphe and Defender, identifying them merely as two low-lying objects in the water which the submarine chaser crews believed were Central Powers submarines. The submarine chasers challenged the British destroyers with recognition signals flashed several times by blinker light. Nymphe and Defender did not respond, so the submarine chasers opened fire, with SC-94 firing two rounds and SC-151 firing one. One of SC-94′s shots hit Nymphe, severing a steam line and putting one of her steam engines out of commission. Nymphe and Defender immediately flashed lights at the submarine chasers, which ceased fire, went alongside the destroyers, and discovered their identities. When the submarine chaser crews asked why the destroyers had not answered the recognition signals, the crews of Nymphe and Defender replied that they had orders not to use recognition signals, a restriction unknown to the submarine chaser crews because of a lack of a unified Allied command in the area. Defender took Nymphe in tow, and the submarine chasers resumed their antisubmarine patrol. Discussing the incident in a letter to the British Admiralty, the commander of United States Naval Forces Operating in European Waters, Vice Admiral William Sims, wrote: "While it appears that, under attendant circumstances, the commanding officers of the submarine chasers were justified in opening fire on the destroyers, I nevertheless wish to express regret that the incident occurred, and that H.M.S. Nymphe should have sustained damage."

In July and August 1918 the 5th Destroyer Flotilla was based at Brindisi, Italy. On 2 October 1918, Nymphe supported the Allied bombardment of Austro-Hungarian forces at Durazzo, Albania, protecting the southern flank of the main bombardment force and supporting a force of U.S. Navy submarine chasers. In November 1918, she was one of 14 H-class destroyers in the 5th Destroyer Flotilla, which by then was based at Mudros in the Aegean Sea. World War I ended with the armistice with Germany of 11 November 1918.

=== Later service and disposal ===
From December 1918 to February 1919, Nymphe was part of the British Aegean Squadron, as were all other surviving ships of her class except Lyra. In February 1919, she was listed as part of the destroyer flotilla at Malta. In November 1919, she was not listed as an active ship. She was sold on 9 May 1921 to be broken up.
