= USS SC-151 =

WWI US submarine chaser

History

United States NavyUnited States
- Name: USS Submarine Chaser No. 151 (1917–1919); USS SC-151 (1920)
- Builder: Gibbs Gas Engine Company, Jacksonville, Florida
- Commissioned: 14 December 1917
- Reclassified: SC-151 on 17 July 1920
- Identification: GTLC (1917); NOKX (1919)
- Fate: Sold 24 June 1921

United States
- Name: Usona
- Acquired: 1921
- Fate: Sold to U.S. Navy 1942

United States NavyUnited States
- Name: USS YP-191
- Acquired: 1942
- Identification: NXWD
- Fate: Transferred to U.S. Maritime Commission June 1946; Sold

United States
- Name: Sea Queen III
- Status: Extant ca. 1952

General characteristics
- Class & type: SC-1-class submarine chaser
- Displacement: 77 tons normal; 85 tons full load
- Length: 110 ft (34 m) overall; 105 ft (32 m) between perpendiculars
- Beam: 14 ft 9 in (4.50 m)
- Draft: 5 ft 7 in (1.70 m) normal; 6 ft 6 in (1.98 m) full load
- Propulsion: Three 220 hp (164 kW) Standard Motor Construction Company six-cylinder gasoline engines, three shafts, 2,400 US gal (2,000 imp gal; 9,100 L) of gasoline; one Standard Motor Construction Company two-cylinder gasoline-powered auxiliary engine
- Speed: 18 knots (33 km/h; 21 mph)
- Range: 1,000 nmi (1,850 km; 1,150 mi) at 10 knots (19 km/h; 12 mph)
- Complement: 27 (2 officers, 25 enlisted men)
- Sensors & processing systems: One Submarine Signal Company S.C. C Tube, M.B. Tube, or K Tube hydrophone
- Armament: 1 × 3-inch (76.2-mm)/23-caliber gun mount; 2 × Colt .30 caliber (7.62-mm) machine guns; 1 × Y-gun depth charge projector

USS SC-151, prior to July 1920 known as USS Submarine Chaser No. 151 or USS S.C. 151, was an SC-1-class submarine chaser built for the United States Navy during World War I. She operated as part of the Otranto Barrage during the war.

After World War I, the former SC-151 became the fishing boat Usona. She returned to U.S. Navy service during World War II as the yard patrol boat USS YP-191. After World War II, she again became a fishing boat, named Sea Queen III.

== Construction and commissioning ==
SC-151 was a wooden-hulled 110-foot (34 m) submarine chaser built by the Gibbs Gas Engine Company at Jacksonville, Florida. She was commissioned at the Charleston Navy Yard in Charleston, South Carolina, on 14 December 1917 as USS Submarine Chaser No. 151, abbreviated at the time as USS S.C. 151.

== Service history ==
=== World War I ===
Assigned to operate as part of the Otranto Barrage in the Strait of Otranto between Brindisi, Italy, and Corfu, S.C. 151 arrived at Corfu on 5 June 1918 as part of a convoy consisting of 21 submarine chasers and their mother ship, the former collier and survey ship USS Leonidas. Operating from Base 25, a newly constructed U.S. Navy submarine chaser base in a bay on the east side of Corfu northwest of the city of Corfu, she was assigned along with the submarine chasers USS S.C. 94 and USS S.C. 227 to Unit F of Squadron 1.

On the evening of 18 June 1918, Unit F was on an antisubmarine patrol in the Strait of Otranto when it became involved in a friendly fire incident. At 21:00, the submarine chasers′ hydrophones detected sounds which their crews assumed were coming from a submarine. The submarine chasers followed the sounds until 22:40, when they grew louder and the submarine chaser crews interpreted them as coming from a submarine on the surface. All three submarine chasers headed toward the source of the sound at flank speed and soon sighted the Royal Navy destroyers HMS Defender and HMS Nymphe, identifying them merely as two low-lying objects in the water which the submarine chaser crews believed were Central Powers submarines. The submarine chasers challenged the British destroyers with recognition signals flashed several times by blinker light. Defender and Nymphe did not respond, so the submarine chasers opened fire, with SC-94 firing two rounds and SC-151 firing one. One of SC-94′s shots hit Nymphe, severing a steam line and putting one of her steam engines out of commission. Defender and Nymphe immediately flashed lights at the submarine chasers, which ceased fire, went alongside the destroyers, and discovered their identities. When the submarine chaser crews asked why the destroyers had not answered the recognition signals, the crews of Defender and Nymphe replied that they had orders not to use recognition signals, a restriction unknown to the submarine chaser crews because of a lack of a unified Allied command in the area. Defender took Nymphe in tow, and the submarine chasers resumed their antisubmarine patrol. Discussing the incident in a letter to the British Admiralty, the commander of United States Naval Forces Operating in European Waters, Vice Admiral William Sims, wrote: "While it appears that, under attendant circumstances, the commanding officers of the submarine chasers were justified in opening fire on the destroyers, I nevertheless wish to express regret that the incident occurred, and that H.M.S. Nymphe should have sustained damage."

Beginning at 11:30 on 19 June 1919, Unit F and Unit G (made up of USS S.C. 95, USS S.C. 179, and USS S.C. 338) gained and lost sound contact on a submarine several times before Unit G finally attacked it with 16 depth charges at 40°24′N 019°00′E. After the attack, Unit G again made sound contact on the submarine, indicating that it had survived, but Unit G's submarine chasers had expended all of their depth charges and therefore discontinued pursuit of it.

S.C. 151 was involved in another friendly fire incident on 20 June 1918, when the British destroyer HMS Acorn mistakenly opened gunfire on her. Acorn fired four or five shots, all of which missed.

An armistice with Austria-Hungary went into effect on 3 November 1918, and World War I ended on 11 November 1918 with the armistice with Germany.

=== Interwar period ===
By late October 1918, Austria-Hungary had begun to disintegrate, and its dissolution led to a requirement for Allied forces to maintain order along the Adriatic coast of what had been Austria-Hungary. As a result, on 15 November 1918, Unit F received orders to proceed to the island of Lissa in the Adriatic. S.C. 151 also saw service towing lighters for the collier USS Jason at Spalato in the new Kingdom of the Serbs, Croats, and Slovenes.

After completing post-war operations, S.C. 151 returned to the United States and was decommissioned. When the U.S. Navy adopted its modern hull number system on 17 July 1920, Submarine Chaser No. 151 was classified as SC-151 and her name was shortened to USS SC-151. On 24 June 1921, she was sold to Joseph G. Hitner of Philadelphia, Pennsylvania. She was converted into a party fishing boat and renamed Usona, an acronym for "United States of North America," an alternative name for the United States of America sometimes used during the 19th century.

=== World War II ===
The United States entered World War II on 7 December 1941, and in 1942 the U.S. Navy acquired Usona as part of the "splinter fleet" or "splinter navy," a wide variety of wooden boats the United States Armed Forces acquired for war service. Converted for use as a yard patrol boat, she entered service as USS YP-191 and conducted antisubmarine patrols as part of the Inshore Patrol along the United States East Coast. Hostilities concluded on 15 August 1945, and in June 1946 the U.S. Navy transferred YP-191 to the United States Maritime Commission for disposal.

=== Post-World War II ===
The U.S. Maritime Commission sold the former YP-191 to Captain Fred Schmahl of New York City. She was converted back into a fishing boat and renamed Sea Queen III. Sea Queen III was still in service ca. 1952.

== Honors and awards ==
- World War I Victory Medal with Submarine Chaser Clasp for the period 22 April–11 November 1918
