= USS SC-227 =

WWI US submarine chaser

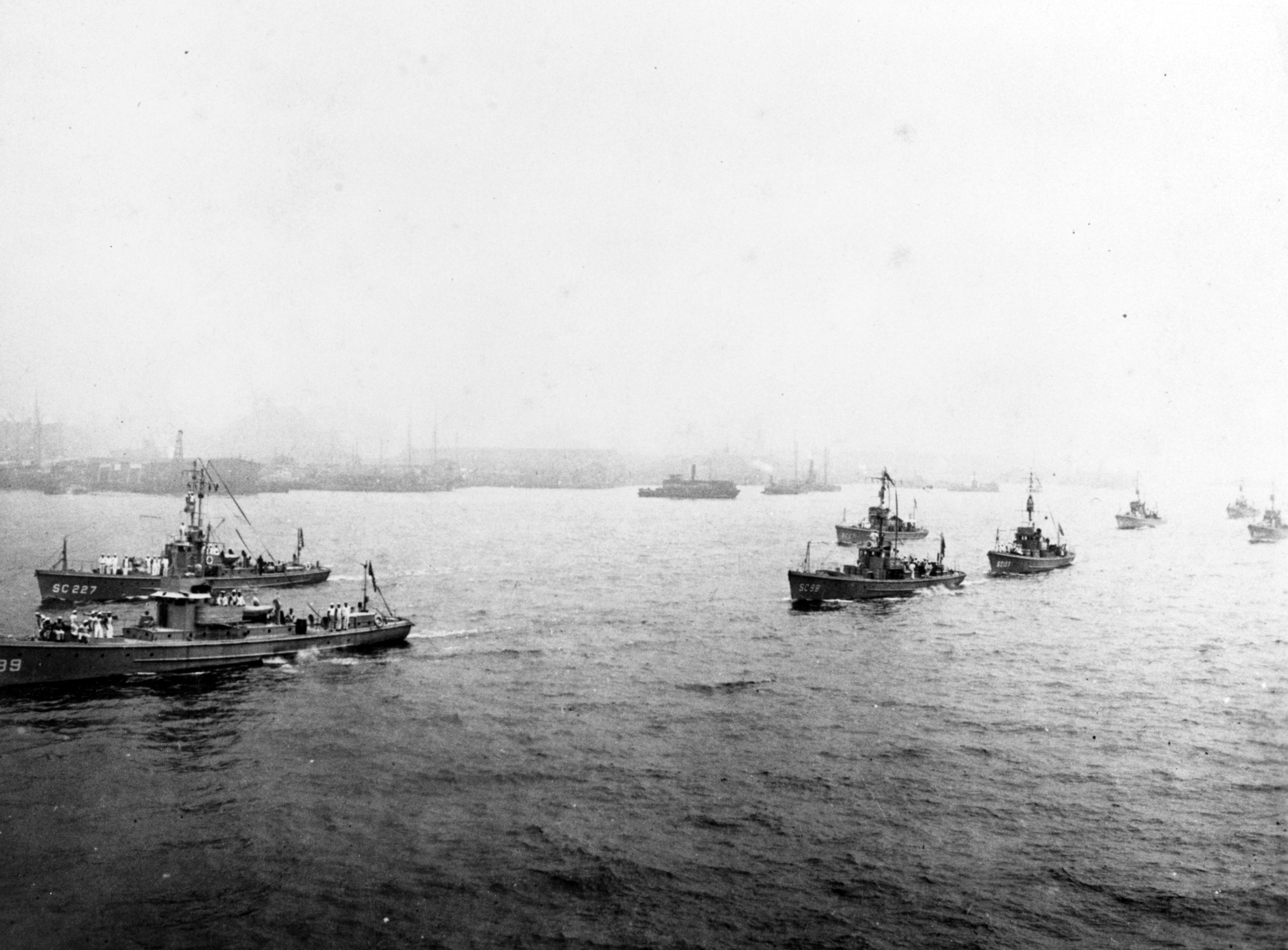
- United States Navy submarine chasers underway in New York Harbor on 20 August 1919 upon their return from overseas service. USS SC-227 is at upper left, USS SC-99 is at lower left, USS SC-98 and USS SC-137 are in the closer column at right, and USS SC-271 is in the farther column at right. The submarine chasers in the far right background are unidentified.

History

United States NavyUnited States
- Name: USS Submarine Chaser No. 227 (1917-1920); USS SC-227 (1920)
- Builder: New York Yacht, Launch & Engine Company, Morris Heights, New York
- Commissioned: 24 December 1917
- Decommissioned: 10 September 1919
- Reclassified: SC-227 on 17 July 1920
- Identification: GTMB (1917); NOPL (1924)
- Fate: Sold 14 October 1924

United States
- Name: SC-227 (1927)
- Owner: Florida Boat Company (1924); T. A. Parcels (1927); Sea Scouts of Mount Clemens, Michigan (1927)
- Renamed: Griffin 1927

General characteristics
- Class & type: SC-1-class submarine chaser
- Displacement: 77 tons normal; 85 tons full load
- Length: 110 ft (34 m) overall; 105 ft (32 m) between perpendiculars
- Beam: 14 ft 9 in (4.50 m)
- Draft: 5 ft 7 in (1.70 m) normal; 6 ft 6 in (1.98 m) full load
- Propulsion: Three 220 hp (164 kW) Standard Motor Construction Company six-cylinder gasoline engines, three shafts, 2,400 US gal (2,000 imp gal; 9,100 L) of gasoline; one Standard Motor Construction Company two-cylinder gasoline-powered auxiliary engine
- Speed: 18 knots (33 km/h; 21 mph)
- Range: 1,000 nmi (1,850 km; 1,150 mi) at 10 knots (19 km/h; 12 mph)
- Complement: 27 (2 officers, 25 enlisted men)
- Sensors & processing systems: One Submarine Signal Company S.C. C Tube, M.B. Tube, or K Tube hydrophone
- Armament: 1 × 3-inch (76.2-mm)/23-caliber gun mount; 2 × Colt .30 caliber (7.62-mm) machine guns; 1 × Y-gun depth charge projector

USS SC-227, prior to July 1920 known as USS Submarine Chaser No. 227 or USS S.C. 227, was an SC-1-class submarine chaser built for the United States Navy during World War I. She operated as part of the Otranto Barrage during the war.

After World War I, the former USS SC-227 became the motor yacht SC-227. She later became the property of the Sea Scouts with the name Griffin.

== Construction and commissioning ==
SC-227 was a wooden-hulled 110-foot (34 m) submarine chaser built by the New York Yacht, Launch & Engine Company at Morris Heights in the Bronx, New York. She was commissioned on 24 December 1917 at New York City as USS Submarine Chaser No. 227, abbreviated at the time as USS S.C. 227.

== Service history ==
=== World War I ===
Assigned to operate as part of the Otranto Barrage in the Strait of Otranto between Brindisi, Italy, and Corfu, S.C. 227 arrived at Corfu on 5 June 1918 as part of a convoy consisting of 21 submarine chasers and their mother ship, the former collier and survey ship USS Leonidas. Operating from Base 25, a newly constructed U.S. Navy submarine chaser base in a bay on the east side of Corfu northwest of the city of Corfu, she was assigned along with the submarine chasers USS S.C. 94 and USS S.C. 151 to Unit F of Squadron 1.

On the evening of 18 June 1918, Unit F was on an antisubmarine patrol in the Strait of Otranto when it became involved in a friendly fire incident. At 21:00, the submarine chasers′ hydrophones detected sounds which their crews assumed were coming from a submarine. The submarine chasers followed the sounds until 22:40, when they grew louder and the submarine chaser crews interpreted them as coming from a submarine on the surface. All three submarine chasers headed toward the source of the sound at flank speed and soon sighted the Royal Navy destroyers HMS Defender and HMS Nymphe, identifying them merely as two low-lying objects in the water which the submarine chaser crews believed were Central Powers submarines. The submarine chasers challenged the British destroyers with recognition signals flashed several times by blinker light. Defender and Nymphe did not respond, so the submarine chasers opened fire, with SC-94 firing two rounds and SC-151 firing one. One of SC-94′s shots hit Nymphe, severing a steam line and putting one of her steam engines out of commission. Defender and Nymphe immediately flashed lights at the submarine chasers, which ceased fire, went alongside the destroyers, and discovered their identities. When the submarine chaser crews asked why the destroyers had not answered the recognition signals, the crews of Defender and Nymphe replied that they had orders not to use recognition signals, a restriction unknown to the submarine chaser crews because of a lack of a unified Allied command in the area. Defender took Nymphe in tow, and the submarine chasers resumed their antisubmarine patrol. Discussing the incident in a letter to the British Admiralty, the commander of United States Naval Forces Operating in European Waters, Vice Admiral William Sims, wrote: "While it appears that, under attendant circumstances, the commanding officers of the submarine chasers were justified in opening fire on the destroyers, I nevertheless wish to express regret that the incident occurred, and that H.M.S. Nymphe should have sustained damage."

Beginning at 11:30 on 19 June 1919, Unit F and Unit G (made up of USS S.C. 95, USS S.C. 179, and USS S.C. 338) gained and lost sound contact on a submarine several times before Unit G finally attacked it with 16 depth charges at 40°24′N 019°00′E. After the attack, Unit G again made sound contact on the submarine, indicating that it had survived, but Unit G's submarine chasers had expended all of their depth charges and therefore discontinued pursuit of it.

On 11 November 1918, S.C. 227 and the submarine chaser USS S.C. 331 attacked an Imperial German Navy submarine in the vicinity of Gibraltar. No sinking was confirmed, but it was the last reported attack by U.S. submarine chasers of World War I, which ended that day with the armistice with Germany.

=== Post-World War I ===
By late October 1918, Austria-Hungary had begun to disintegrate, and it agreed to an armistice with the Allies on 3 November 1918. Its dissolution led to a requirement for Allied forces to maintain order along the Adriatic coast of what had been Austria-Hungary. As a result, on 15 November 1918, Unit F received orders to proceed to the island of Lissa in the Adriatic.

After completing post-war operations, S.C. 227 returned to the United States, reaching New York City by August 1919. She was decommissioned at New York City on 10 September 1919. When the U.S. Navy adopted its modern hull number system on 17 July 1920, Submarine Chaser No. 227 was classified as SC-227 and her name was shortened to USS SC-227. On 14 October 1924, she was sold to the Florida Boat Company of Washington, D.C.

In 1927, the former USS SC-227 was registered to T. A. Parcels of New York City as the motor yacht SC-227. Later in 1927 she was sold to the Sea Scouts of Mount Clemens, Michigan, of the Macomb County, Michigan, Boy Scout Council, using funds provided by the Mount Clemens Yacht Club, and was renamed Griffin.

== Honors and awards ==
- World War I Victory Medal with Submarine Chaser Clasp for the period 22 April–11 November 1918
