= Charles P. Nelson (admiral) =

United States Navy officer (1877-1935)

Charles Preston Nelson
- Nelson c. 1897
- Born: February 5, 1877; Baltimore, Maryland, U.S.
- Died: November 16, 1935 (aged 58); Naval Hospital Philadelphia, Pennsylvania, U.S.
- Burial place: US Naval Academy Cemetery
- Education: United States Naval Academy
- Military career
- Allegiance: United States of America
- Branch: United States Navy
- Service years: 1894–1933
- Rank: Rear Admiral
- Commands: Plunger (SS-2); Leonidas (AD-7); Mayrant (DD-31); Parker (DD-48); Cincinnati (CL-6)
- Conflicts: Spanish–American War; Blockade of Santiago de Cuba; Philippine–American War; World War I; Second Battle of Durazzo

Charles Preston Nelson (5 February 1877 – 16 November 1935) was an officer of the United States Navy. He would attain the rank of Rear Admiral by the end of his career. He is remembered for his work with torpedo boats and submarines.

== Biography ==
Nelson was born in Baltimore, Maryland, and was appointed naval cadet 19 May 1894; and graduated 2 April 1898. During the Spanish–American War, he served in New Orleans (CL-22) participating in the blockade and but was absent at the Battle of Santiago de Cuba. Then sent to the Far East, he served in the Philippines during the Philippine–American War.

Upon returning to the United States, he worked with the torpedo boat training command. Also on 19 September 1903, Plunger (SS-2) (Submarine Torpedo Boat No. 2) was commissioned with Lieutenant Nelson in command. This boat would later be renamed A-1 and classified SS-2.

In 1912, he served as First Lieutenant of Illinois (BB-7) and later of Ohio (BB-12). Appointed to command of Leonidas (AD-7), a tender for submarine chasers, he also assumed command of the submarine chaser divisions ordered to Corfu, Greece. Twelve of the submarine chasers under his command participated with the British and Italian naval forces in the destruction of the Austrian naval base at Durazzo on 2 October 1918. As a screen for heavy ships during the bombardment, his craft were subjected to heavy fire. Returning to base, they helped screen HMS Weymouth. For his services during this action, Nelson was awarded the Navy Distinguished Service Medal and several foreign decorations.

From 1919 until 1929, he was assigned duties in the 3rd and 4th Naval Districts. In January 1929, he was appointed coordinator of the Seattle area, in which capacity he served until he retired as Rear Admiral 30 June 1933. He died at the Philadelphia Naval Hospital 16 November 1935.

== Namesake ==
In 1942, a Gleaves-class destroyer, Nelson (DD-623), was named after him and it fought during World War II
