= USS SC-95 =

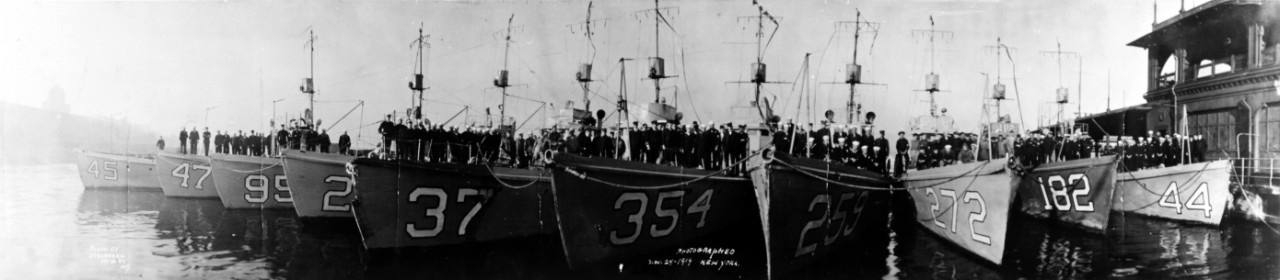
- United States Navy submarine chasers docked at New York City on 24 November 1919. Left to right: USS SC-45, USS SC-47, SC-95, USS SC-207, USS SC-37, USS SC-354, USS SC-259, USS SC-272, USS SC-182, USS SC-44.

History

United States Navy
- Name: USS Submarine Chaser No. 95 (1917–1920); USS SC-95 (1920–1921)
- Builder: Electric Launch Company (Elco), Bayonne, New Jersey
- Commissioned: 24 December 1917
- Reclassified: SC-95 on 17 July 1920
- Identification: NOGB
- Fate: Sold 24 June 1921

History

United States
- Name: Service (1927); Faithful (1931)
- Identification: MDGB

General characteristics
- Class & type: SC-1-class submarine chaser
- Displacement: 77 tons normal; 85 tons full load
- Length: 110 ft (34 m) overall; 105 ft (32 m) between perpendiculars
- Beam: 14 ft 9 in (4.50 m)
- Draft: 5 ft 7 in (1.70 m) normal; 6 ft 6 in (1.98 m) full load
- Propulsion: Three 220 hp (164 kW) Standard Motor Construction Company six-cylinder gasoline engines, three shafts, 2,400 US gal (2,000 imp gal; 9,100 L) of gasoline; one Standard Motor Construction Company two-cylinder gasoline-powered auxiliary engine
- Speed: 18 knots (33 km/h; 21 mph)
- Range: 1,000 nmi (1,850 km; 1,150 mi) at 10 knots (19 km/h; 12 mph)
- Complement: 27 (2 officers, 25 enlisted men)
- Sensors & processing systems: One Submarine Signal Company S.C. C Tube, M.B. Tube, or K Tube hydrophone
- Armament: 1 × 3-inch (76.2-mm)/23-caliber gun mount; 2 × Colt .30 caliber (7.62-mm) machine guns; 1 × Y-gun depth charge projector

USS SC-95, prior to July 1920 known as USS Submarine Chaser No. 95 or USS S.C. 95, was an SC-1-class submarine chaser built for the United States Navy during World War I. She operated as part of the Otranto Barrage during the war. Postwar, she saw service in the Adriatic Sea, in North Russia, and in the clearance of the North Sea Mine Barrage. After her U.S. Navy service, she became a private motor yacht.

== Construction and commissioning ==
SC-95 was a wooden-hulled 110-foot (34 m) submarine chaser built by the Electric Launch Company (Elco) at Bayonne, New Jersey. She was commissioned on 24 December 1917 as USS Submarine Chaser No. 95, abbreviated at the time as USS S.C. 95.

== Service history ==
=== United States Navy ===
==== World War I ====
Assigned to operate as part of the Otranto Barrage in the Strait of Otranto between Brindisi, Italy, and Corfu, S.C. 95 arrived at Corfu on 5 June 1918, as part of a convoy consisting of 21 submarine chasers and their mother ship, the former collier and survey ship USS Leonidas. Operating from Base 25, a newly constructed U.S. Navy submarine chaser base in a bay on the east side of Corfu northwest of the city of Corfu, she was assigned along with the submarine chasers USS S.C. 179 and USS S.C. 338 to Unit G of Squadron 2.

Unit G was operating in the Otranto Barrage on 18 June 1918, when it gained sound contact on a Central Powers submarine at 17:29. The three submarine chasers followed the contact to the northeast and attacked it with 17 depth charges at 40°19′N 018°49′E. No kill was confirmed, but the unit received credit for probably damaging or sinking a submarine. Beginning at 11:30 on 19 June, Unit G and Unit F (made up of USS S.C. 94, USS S.C. 151, and USS S.C. 227) gained and lost sound contact on a submarine several times before Unit G finally attacked it with 16 depth charges at 40°24′N 019°00′E. After the attack, Unit G again made sound contact on the submarine, indicating that it had survived, but Unit G's submarine chasers had expended all of their depth charges and therefore discontinued pursuit of it.

On 2 October 1918, Unit G took part in the Allied bombardment of Austro-Hungarian forces at Durazzo, Albania, providing an antisubmarine escort for the Royal Navy and Regia Marina (Italian Royal Navy) warships that carried out the shore bombardment.

An armistice with Austria-Hungary went into effect on 3 November 1918, and World War I ended on 11 November 1918, with the armistice with Germany.

==== Post-war ====
By late October 1918, Austria-Hungary had begun to disintegrate, and its dissolution led to a requirement for Allied forces to maintain order along the Adriatic coast of what had been Austria-Hungary. As a result, on 15 November 1918, Unit G received orders to proceed to Pola, which had been a base for the Austro-Hungarian Navy. Unit G returned to Corfu on 21 November 1918, but put back to sea on 22 November as part of a force of submarine chasers carrying six officers and 125 enlisted men to Cattaro, another former Austro-Hungarian Navy base, which they reached after a rough, day-long passage.

In March 1919, S.C. 95 was among 12 submarine chasers selected for service in the White Sea in North Russia as part of the Allied intervention in the Russian Civil War. Getting underway from Corfu, the submarine chasers stopped at Lisbon, Portugal, departed Lisbon on 10 April 1919, bound for Brest, France, and left Brest on 19 April 1919. After a calling at Milford Haven, Wales, they skipped a planned stop at Belfast, Ireland, and began a two-day transit of Scotland′s Caledonian Canal, spending a night at Fort William before arriving at Base 18 at Inverness on 24 April 1919, and beginning final preparations for North Russia service. They received orders to proceed to Russia on 7 May 1919, but numerous delays followed when their assigned flagship, the protected cruiser USS Des Moines, arrived at Brest from the Pacific Ocean in a disabled condition and in need of significant repairs and the British tanker HMS Elerol, assigned to refuel them on their voyage, suffered damage in a collision. In late May 1919, plans for nine of the submarine chasers to deploy to North Russia were cancelled, with only S.C. 95, USS S.C. 256, and USS S.C. 354 still committed to operations there.

Accompanied by the British tanker HMS Birchol, the three submarine chasers departed Inverness on 6 June 1919. They stopped at Lerwick in the Shetland Islands on 7 June and then, after a rough passage of the North Sea, arrived at Holmengraa, Norway, on 8 June 1919. They then proceeded northward along the coast of Norway via inland passages created by islands and fjords, sometimes under sail to save fuel. After crossing the Arctic Circle, they reached Tromsø, Norway on 12 June 1919. After an 18-hour stop there, they passed through Soro Sound into the Arctic Ocean in the waters northeast of North Cape. On 15 June 1919, they rendezvoused off the Kola Inlet with the steam schooner USS Yankton, which passed orders to them to skip a planned stop at Murmansk and proceed directly to Arkhangelsk. Under escort by Yankton, the three submarine chasers headed into the White Sea along the coast of the Kola Peninsula, sometimes crawling through heavy fog. They reached the mouth of the Dvina River on 18 June and proceeded up the river to Arkhangelsk, which they reached later that morning, becoming units of the U.S. Navy's Northern Russia Detachment.

From Arkhangelsk, the three submarine chasers performed ferry service and diplomatic functions. At various times they also took part in six days of target practice in June 1919 with Yankton, the gunboat USS Sacramento, and the patrol boats USS Eagle Boat No. 1, USS Eagle Boat No. 2, and USS Eagle Boat No. 3 in Keret Bay, north of Kem. On 4 July 1919, the crews of the ships of the Northern Russia Detachment took part in a showcase celebration of Independence Day on Kego Island in the Dvina River delta.

On 5 July 1919, the three submarine chasers departed Arkhangelsk to proceed to the United Kingdom. After a stop at Murmansk, they proceeded along the coast of Norway, and their crews were granted a week of shore leave at Christiana, Norway. They arrived at Kirkwall in the Orkney Islands on 28 July 1919. There they joined 21 other submarine chasers in the Mine Laying Division, which had begun to sweep the North Sea Mine Barrage. The submarine chasers supported the operation by following minesweepers and sinking with rifle fire the naval mines that the minesweepers brought to the surface.

Sources provide duffering accounts of S.C. 95′s operations during September 1919. According to one source, after completion of the minesweeping operation, she was among six submarine chasers which received orders on 4 September 1919, to proceed to Devonport, England. Escorted by the repair ship USS Panther, the submarine chasers departed Kirkwall on 5 September, stopped at Granton, Scotland, briefly to refuel, and arrived at Devonport on 10 September 1919, after an uneventful passage. Six other submarine chasers later joined them there. According to another source, S.C. 95 still was operating in the North Sea Mine Barrage when a mine explosion damaged her; she suffered no casualties.

In either case, S.C. 95 was among the submarine chasers which arrived at Devonport, where they were drydocked, then underwent additional repairs pierside. When their repairs were complete, the submarine chasers began a voyage to the United States, each under tow by a minesweeper and accompanied by Panther. The 25 vessels began their journey on 10 October 1919, and proceeded to Brest, where they made a five-day port call. On 15 October, they departed for Lisbon, where they arrived on 19 October. They set out across the Atlantic Ocean on 23 October and made port at Ponta Delgada on São Miguel Island in the Azores at various times on 26 and 27 October. They began the next leg of their journey, a stormy passage to Bermuda, on 28 October, finally reaching Bermuda on 9 November. They resumed their voyage on 15 November and, after encountering an even more severe storm, arrived at Tompkinsville, Staten Island, New York, on 19 November 1919. On 24 November 1919, the day the Minesweeping Detachment was disbanded, the submarine chasers proceeded up the Hudson River to Brooklyn, New York, and their crews were treated to a Minesweeping Detachment dinner at the Hotel Astor.

When the U.S. Navy adopted its modern hull number system on 17 July 1920, Submarine Chaser No. 95 was classified as SC-95 and her name was shortened to USS SC-95.

On 24 June 1921, the Navy sold SC-95 to Joseph G. Hitner of Philadelphia, Pennsylvania.

=== Private yacht ===
After her sale, the former SC-95 was converted into a motor yacht. In 1927 she was registered to Joseph Stiman of Perth Amboy, New Jersey, as the yacht Service. In 1931 she was registered to George Hannon of Atlantic City, New Jersey, as the yacht Faithful.

== Honors and awards ==
- World War I Victory Medal with Submarine Chaser Clasp for the period 22 April – 11 November 1918
