= Osvaldo Paladini =

Italian admiral (1866–1938)

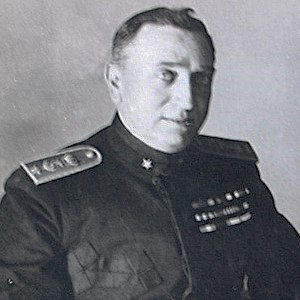
- Paladini in the 1920s
- Born: 26 December 1866; San Marco Argentano, Calabria, Italy
- Died: 25 March 1938 (aged 71); Rome, Lazio, Italy
- Burial place: Campo Verano, Rome, Lazio, Italy
- Military career
- Allegiance: Italy
- Branch: Regia Marina
- Service years: 1882–1930
- Rank: Ammiraglio di squadra
- Commands: Piemonte; Roma
- Conflicts: Italo-Turkish War: Battle of Kunfuda Bay; World War I: Battle of the Mediterranean; Battle of Durazzo

Osvaldo Paladini (26 December 1866 – 25 March 1938) was an Italian admiral who served in the Regia Marina from 1882 to 1930. He took part in the Italo-Turkish War, where he was commander of the Red Sea Naval Division, commanding the Piemonte during the Battle of Kunfuda Bay. For this he was awarded the Knight's Cross of the Military Order of Savoy. Promoted to Rear-Admiral during the World War I, he first commanded the Battle Division, and in 1918 the 3rd Naval Squadron. On 2 October 1918, he was awarded the title of Commander of the Military Order of Savoy and the honor of Grand Officer of the Order of the Crown of Italy.

== Early military career ==
Osvaldo was born on 26 December 1866 at San Marco Argentano where his father worked as a surveyor. In 1882 he enlisted in the Regia Marina, beginning to attend the Italian Naval Academy of Livorno from which he graduated with the rank of midshipman. He embarked successively on the battleships Italia, Sardegna and the ironclad steamer San Martino and from 1899 and 1900, he served within torpedo boats.

As a lieutenant he distinguished himself for the design of a percussion ignition device for medium-caliber guns, being declared suitable for naval artillery service. In 1904, he was promoted to corvette captain, assumed command of the destroyer Aquilone, and was awarded the honour of Knight of the Order of the Crown of Italy. Serving as the commander of the battleship Vittorio Emanuele, in 1908 he received the bronze medal for Civil Valour for the relief brought to the populations of Reggio Calabria and Messina affected by the 1908 Messina earthquake.

Promoted to frigate captain in 1909, in April 1911, on the eve of the Italo-Turkish War, he assumed command of the protected cruiser Piemonte, carrying out exploratory assignments in the Red Sea between Aden and Djibouti, and sending a report to the Ministry of the Navy on the socio-economic conditions of those areas and on the meetings with the local authorities, proposing to the Ministry suitable initiatives for future commercial settlements. In the same year the Bulletin of the Royal Geographical Society published an account of a trip to Nairobi and the French Congo.

== Italo-Turkish War ==
A few months after the outbreak of the Italo-Turkish War, he became the protagonist of a feat that brought him widespread notoriety thanks also to an illustration by Achille Beltrame in the Domenica del Corriere. Upon victory at the Battle of Kunfuda Bay on 7 January 1912, he would send a telegram at 5:15 p.m. consisting of the following:

Cruiser Piedmont, destroyer Garibaldino and Artigliere encountered seven Turkish gunboats and an armed yacht. In spite of good Turkish artillery, our ships annihilated gunboats, captured yachts, and took part in the enemy's guns, flags, and trophies of war.

The action earned him the honors of Officer of the Order of the Crown of Italy and Knight of the Military Order of Savoy because "he directed and coordinated the search for enemy gunboats in locations fraught with hydrographic difficulties, he prepared and conducted the action with promptness and perfect military criteria". Commander of the Maritime Defense of Messina, he was promoted to captain in 1913, and assumed command of the battleship Roma.

== World War I ==
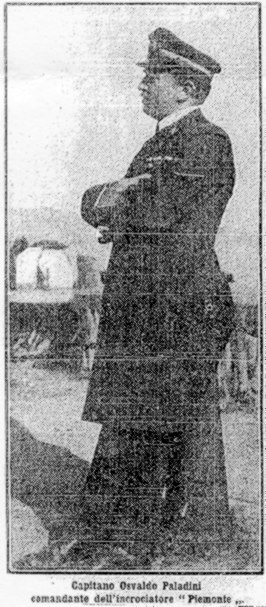
Captain Paladini featured on La Domenica del Corriere.

During the years of the First World War he was promoted to Rear Admiral in 1917, commanding the Roma, before assuming command first of the Battle Division, and in 1918 of the 3rd Naval Squadron, also carrying out orders as Commander of Defense of the Regia Marina and director general of the Maritime Military Arsenal of Taranto. On 2 October 1918 he directed the attack on an Austro-Hungarian naval base in Durrës, earning the title of Commander of the Military Order of Savoy and, for his participation in the war, the honour of Grand Officer of the Order of the Crown of Italy.

== Later military career ==
After the end of the war he served as Commander-in-Chief of the Naval Forces in Albania in 1919 before holding the position of Maritime Military Commander of Ancona in 1920. In 1921, Paladini would get into the fishing industry as a profound connoisseur. In 1920, he was placed in the naval reserve, and in 1923 he was appointed Vice Admiral of the squadron and in 1926 he reached the rank of Squadron Admiral. Paladini retired on 26 December 1930 before dying on 25 March 1938 in Rome and his body was buried in the Campo Verano.

== Awards ==
- Order of the Crown of Italy, Knight (9 June 1904)
- Bronze Medal for Civil Valor for the relief of the populations of the earthquake of 1908 (28 December 1908)
- Commemorative Medal for the Italo-Turkish War 1911–1912
- Order of Saints Maurice and Lazarus, Knight (30 May 1912)
- Military Order of Savoy, Knight (16 March 1913)
- Order of the Crown of Italy, Officer (29 May 1913)
- Order of Saints Maurice and Lazarus, Officer (23 September 1916)
- Military Order of Savoy, Commander (2 February 1919)
- Order of the Crown of Italy, Commander (27 June 1920)
- Allied Victory Medal (Italy) (16 December 1920)
- Commemorative Medal of the Unity of Italy (19 January 1922)
- Cross for Seniority of Military Service (40 years)
