= HMS Defender (1911) =

Destroyer of the Royal Navy

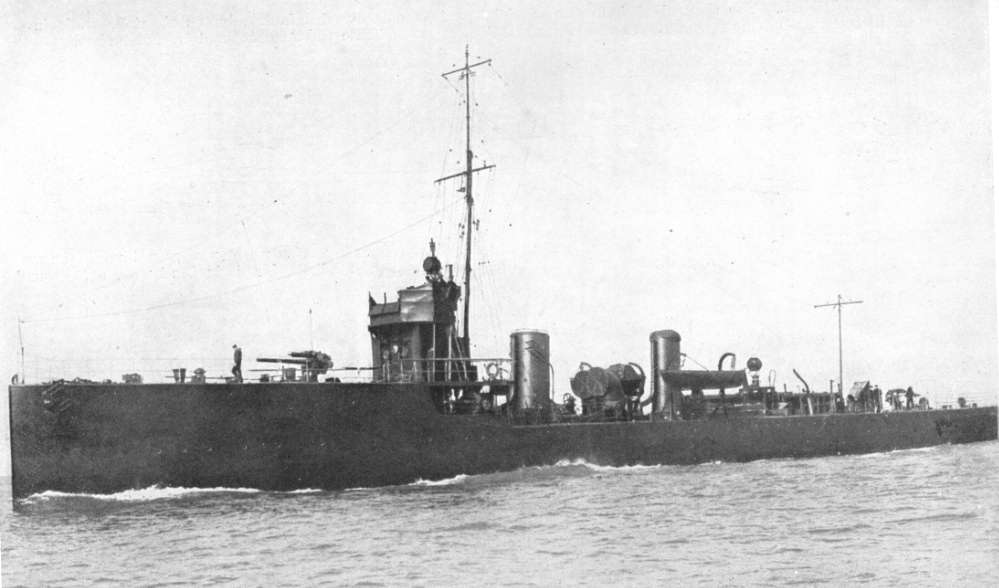
- HMS Defender

History

United Kingdom
- Name: HMS Defender
- Builder: William Denny & Brothers Dumbarton
- Cost: £83,000
- Yard number: 935
- Laid down: 8 November 1910
- Launched: 30 August 1911
- Motto: Fendendo vince; ("By defence I conquer")
- Honours and awards: Heligoland 1914; Dogger Bank 1915; Jutland 1916
- Fate: Sold for scrap on 4 November 1921
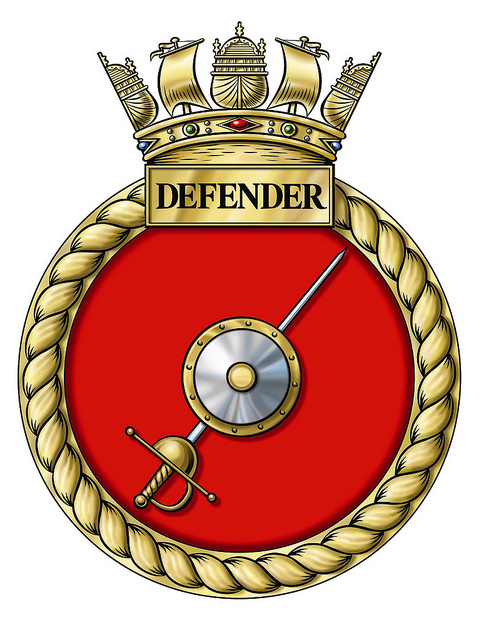
- Badge: On a Field Red, a fencing buckler and rapier Silver and Gold

General characteristics
- Class & type: Acheron-class destroyer
- Displacement: 770 tons
- Length: 75 m (246 ft)
- Beam: 7.8 m (26 ft)
- Draught: 2.7 m (8.9 ft)
- Propulsion: Three shaft Parsons Turbines; Three Yarrow boilers (oil fired); 13,500 shp
- Speed: 27 knots (50 km/h)
- Complement: 70
- Armament: 2 × BL 4-inch (101.6 mm) L/40 Mark VIII guns, mounting P Mark V; 2 × QF 12 pounder 12 cwt naval gun, mounting P Mark I; 2 × single tubes for 21 inch (533 mm) torpedoes

HMS Defender was an Acheron-class destroyer which was built in 1911, served throughout World War I and was broken up in 1921. She was the fifth ship of the name to serve in the Royal Navy.

== Construction ==
Defender was laid down at William Denny & Brothers in Dumbarton, Scotland on 7 November 1910, launched on 30 August 1911 and completed in January 1912. Her total cost was £83,000. Capable of 27 knots (50 km/h), she carried two 4-inch (102 mm) guns, other smaller guns and 21-inch (530 mm) torpedo tubes and had a complement of 70 men.

== Operational history ==
=== Pre-World War One ===
Defender and her sisters formed the First Destroyer Flotilla and were attached to the Grand Fleet in 1914.

=== Battle of Heligoland Bight ===
On 28 August 1914 the Royal Navy and the Imperial German Navy met at the Battle of Heligoland Bight. When the German Destroyer SMS V187 was hit by eight British destroyers and sank with heavy loss of life, Defender stopped to pick up survivors. The reappearance of the German cruiser SMS Stettin caused two of her boats to be left behind. Their crews were lucky to be rescued by the British submarine E4. Short of space, the captain of E4 embarked three German prisoners and supplied the boats with water, biscuits, a compass, and a course to steer, and they returned safely to base.

On 23 November 1914, the British battleships Russell and Exmouth bombarded the German-occupied Belgian port of Zeebrugge, which was being used as a base for German submarines. Defender was one of eight destroyers detached from the Harwich Force to reinforce the escort for the operation, joining six destroyers of the Dover Patrol and four French destroyers. The operation was unchallenged by the German defences, but little damage was done to the port.

=== Battle of Dogger Bank ===
Defender was present at the Battle of Dogger Bank on 24 January 1915 with the First Destroyer Flotilla, led by the light cruiser Aurora.

=== Battle of Jutland ===
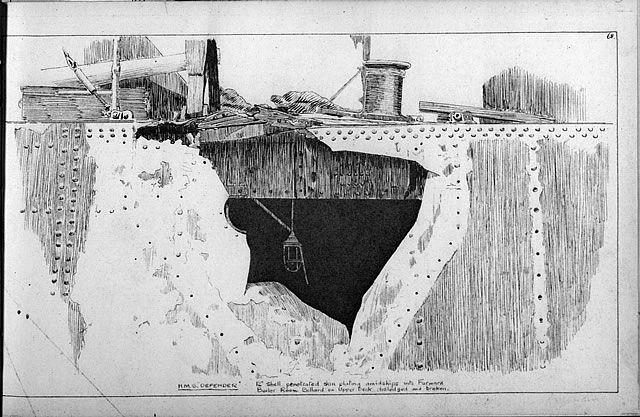
A drawing of the damage sustained by Defender at Jutland

On the night of 31 May - 1 June 1916 Defender took an active part in the Battle of Jutland, with the First Destroyer Flotilla operating in support of Beatty's battlecruiser force. At about 18:30 she was struck in the forward boiler room by a single 12 inch (305 mm) shell, killing one man and wounding two. Although the shell failed to explode, it knocked out the boiler room, reducing the ship's speed to about 15 knots (28 km/h; 17 mph), forcing her out of formation with the rest of her Flotilla. On restoring power (about 19:15) she took the damaged Onslow in tow and made Aberdeen the next day. Her captain, Lieutenant Commander L R Palmer received the Distinguished Service Order. The event was described in detail by Rudyard Kipling, in Sea Warfare under the heading Towing Under Difficulties. The report on the battle by Admiral Beatty stated that:

Defender, whose speed had been reduced to 10 knots, while on the disengaged side of the battle cruisers, was struck by a shell which damaged her foremost boiler, but closed Onslow and took her in tow. Shells were falling all round them during this operation, which, however, was successfully accomplished. During the heavy weather of the ensuing night the tow parted twice, but was resecured. The two struggled on together until 1p.m. 1st June, when Onslow was transferred to tugs. I consider the performances of these two destroyers to be gallant in the extreme, and I am recommending Lieutenant-Commander J. C. Tovey of Onslow, and Lieutenant Commander Palmer of Defender, for special recognition...

— Admiral David Beatty

Lieutenant Commander Palmer wrote after the battle that Onslow had signalled Defender with the following message:

We all Captain, officers and ship’s company thank you very much for your kind and most efficient assistance and wish you all possible luck and a long leave

— Onslow to Defender

Defender was transferred to the 3rd Battle Squadron in 1916.

=== Friendly fire incident ===
On 18 June 1918, Defender was operating in the Strait of Otranto with the destroyer HMS Nymphe when she became a target in a friendly fire incident. The United States Navy submarine chasers USS SC-95, USS SC-151, and USS SC-227 were on an antisubmarine warfare patrol in the strait when at 21:00 their hydrophones detected sounds that their crews assumed were coming from a submarine. They began following the sounds. The sounds grew louder at 22:40, and the submarine chaser crews concluded that they were approaching a surfaced submarine. All three submarine chasers went to full speed and soon sighted Defender and Shaw, which they identified merely as two low-lying objects. They challenged the destroyers by blinker light several times but received no answer, so they opened fire on what they believed were two surfaced enemy submarines, SC-94 firing two rounds and SC-151 one. One of SC-94′s shots struck Nymphe, cutting a steam line and put one of her steam engines out of commission. Both destroyers immediately flashed lights, and the submarine chasers ceased fire and went alongside, discovering that their targets had been Defender and Nymphe. Defender took Nymphe under tow, and the submarine chasers resumed their patrol. A post-incident inquiry found that Defender and Nymphe had not responded to the recognition challenges of the submarine chasers because they had orders not to use recognition signals, a restriction of which the submarine chaser crews were unaware.

== Disposal ==
Defender was laid up and sold to Rees of Llanelly for breaking up on 4 November 1921.

== Pennant numbers ==
Pennant number	From	To
H28	6 December 1914	1 January 1918
H29	1 January 1918	Early 1919
H57	Early 1919	Decommissioning
