= Mediterranean Theatre =

The Mediterranean Theatre is the war zone covering the Mediterranean Sea and may refer to:

- Naval warfare in the Mediterranean during World War I
- Mediterranean and Middle East theatre of World War II
- Mediterranean Theater of Operations, United States Army, the United States Army administrative command in the Mediterranean region during 1942–45
