= Royal Palace of Durrës =

Royal palace of the Principality of Albania

- Pallati Mbreteror i Durrësit
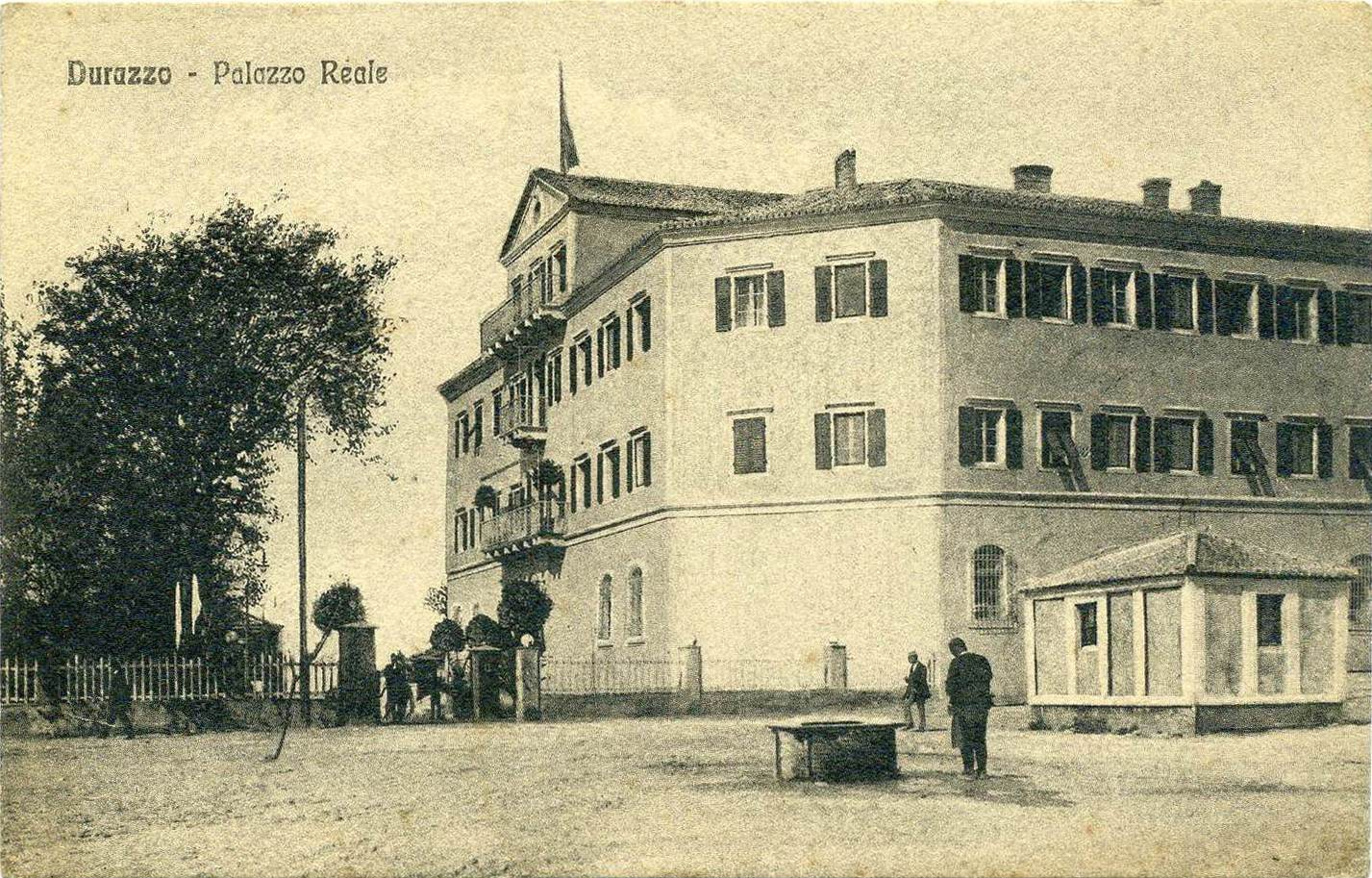
- The main entrance of the palace.
- Alternative names: Konaku i Durrësit

General information
- Type: Palace
- Architectural style: Neoclassical
- Location: Durrës, Albania, Bulevardi Epidamn, Durrës (in front of the first port of Durrës Harbour, where currently the Veliera square is)
- Destroyed: 1926
- Client: Wilhelm, Prince of Albania; Princess Sophie of Schönburg-Waldenburg; Carol Victor, Hereditary Prince of Albania

The Royal Palace of Durrës, sometimes known as the Konak of Durrës (Albanian: Pallati Mbretëror i Shqipërisë or Konaku i Durrësit), was a royal palace of the Principality of Albania situated in Durrës, Albania. It previously served as the chief official residence of Wilhelm, Prince of Albania, and his wife, Princess Sophie of Schönburg-Waldenburg. It has been used by different Albanian governments for various purposes.

== History ==
=== Royal Residence ===
This royal residence had been the seat of the Ottoman prefect (mutasarriflik) of Durrës. The three floors of the building with an interior courtyard contained thirty-five rooms. Its facade was around 50 metres wide. It was constructed using the base of an rampart of the old medieval city walls.

Prince Wilhelm of Wied arrived in Albania at his capital of Durrës on 7 March 1914, along with the Royal Family. Wilhelm, who reigned as 'Vilhelm, Prince of Albania', moved into the building five months later and used it as his palace for his six month reign, when furnishing and a modest bevy of servants were brought from Germany. The palace was raided after the departure of Prince Wilhelm by Muslim rebels and Haxhi Qamili.

=== 1918 Bombardment ===
On 2 October 1918, the palace, along with the entire city of Durrës, was bombarded on the orders Admiral Dominique-Marie Gauchet of the French Navy during the Battle of Durrës. The order was executed by Admiral The Marchese di Revel of the Regia Marina aboard the Dante Alighieri. Admiral Gauchet had followed the instructions of General Louis Franchet d'Espèrey, who was serving the Macedonian front on account of the Allies, and according to whom, the Port of Durres, if not destroyed, would have served the evacuation of the Bulgarian and German armies involved in the First World War. The earthquake of 1926 further destroyed the palace and, by 1930, there were no longer any remains.

=== 2010 Excavation and removal ===
The foundations of the first royal palace of Albania were excavated in the 2010s, and subsequently demolished in 2019 to make place for a new veil-like square named "Veliera".

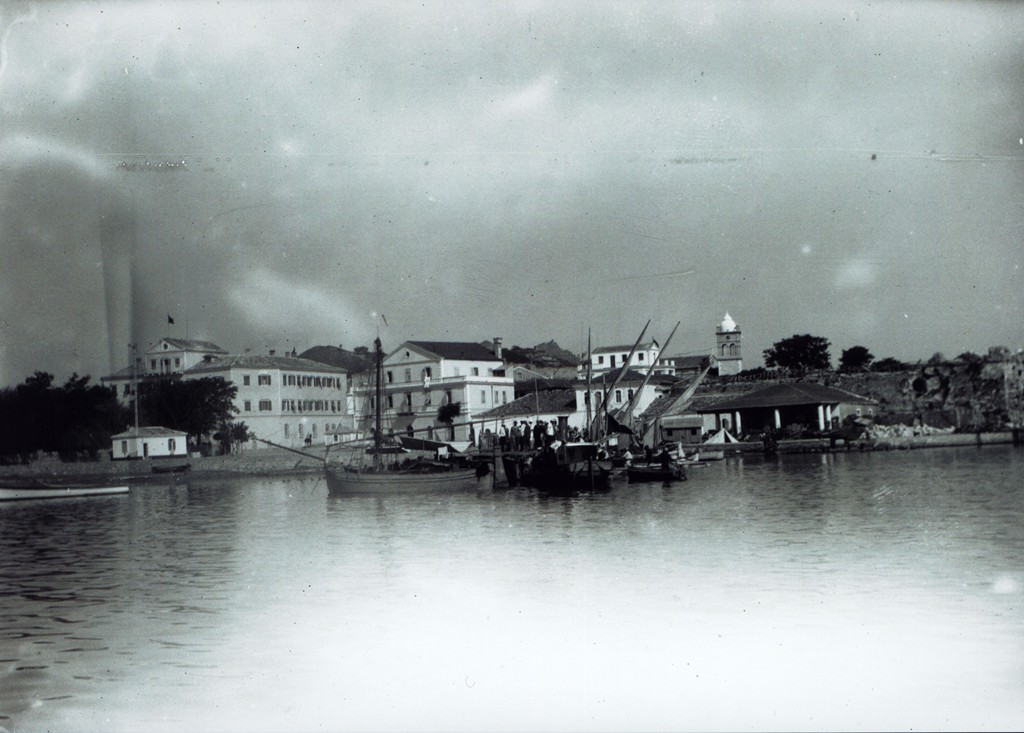
The city of Dürres with the palace on the left

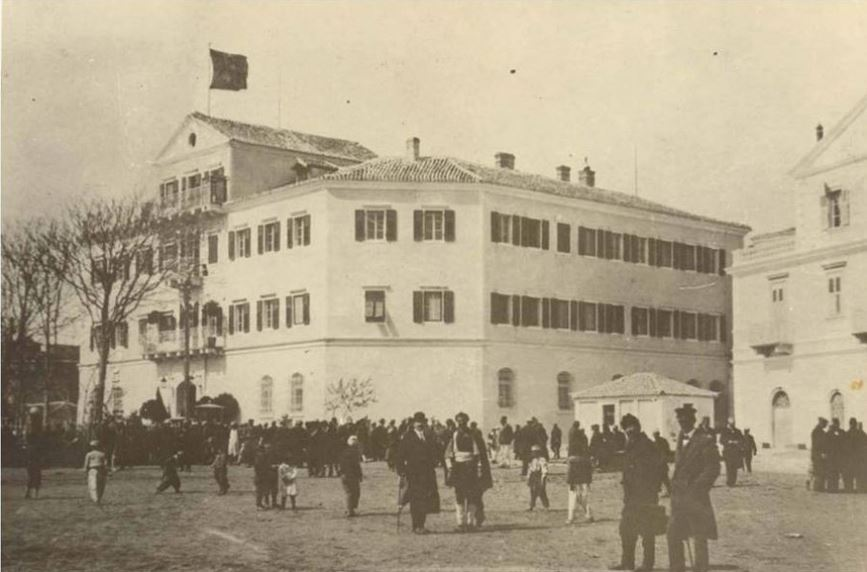
The royal palace in the 1910s

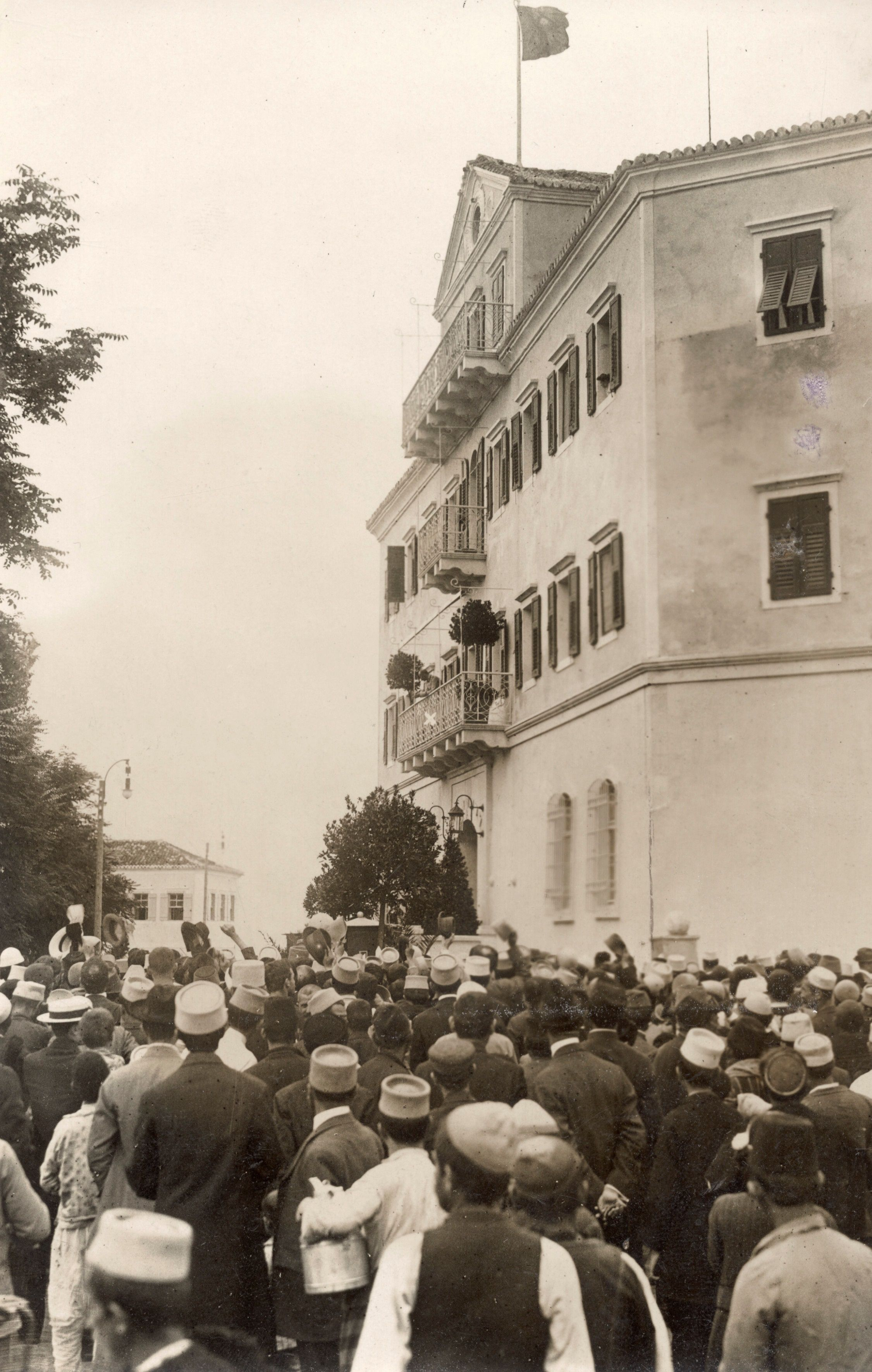
Prince Vilhelm speaking from the balcony

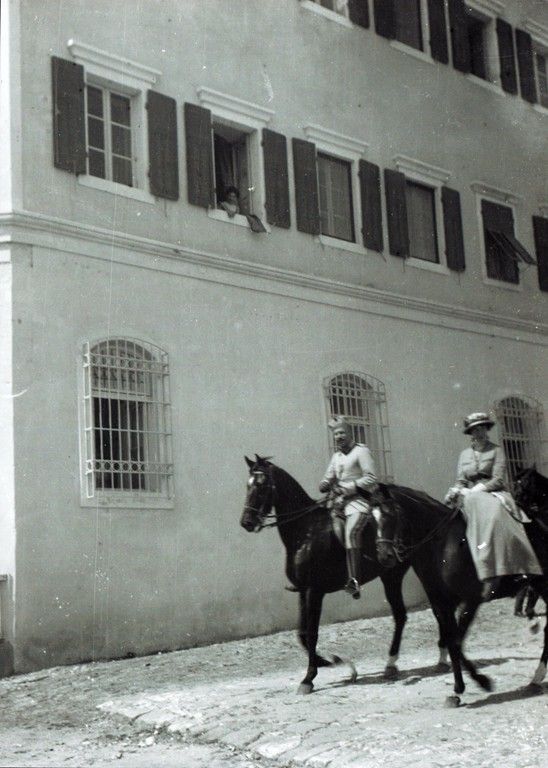
The prince and princess in front of the palace

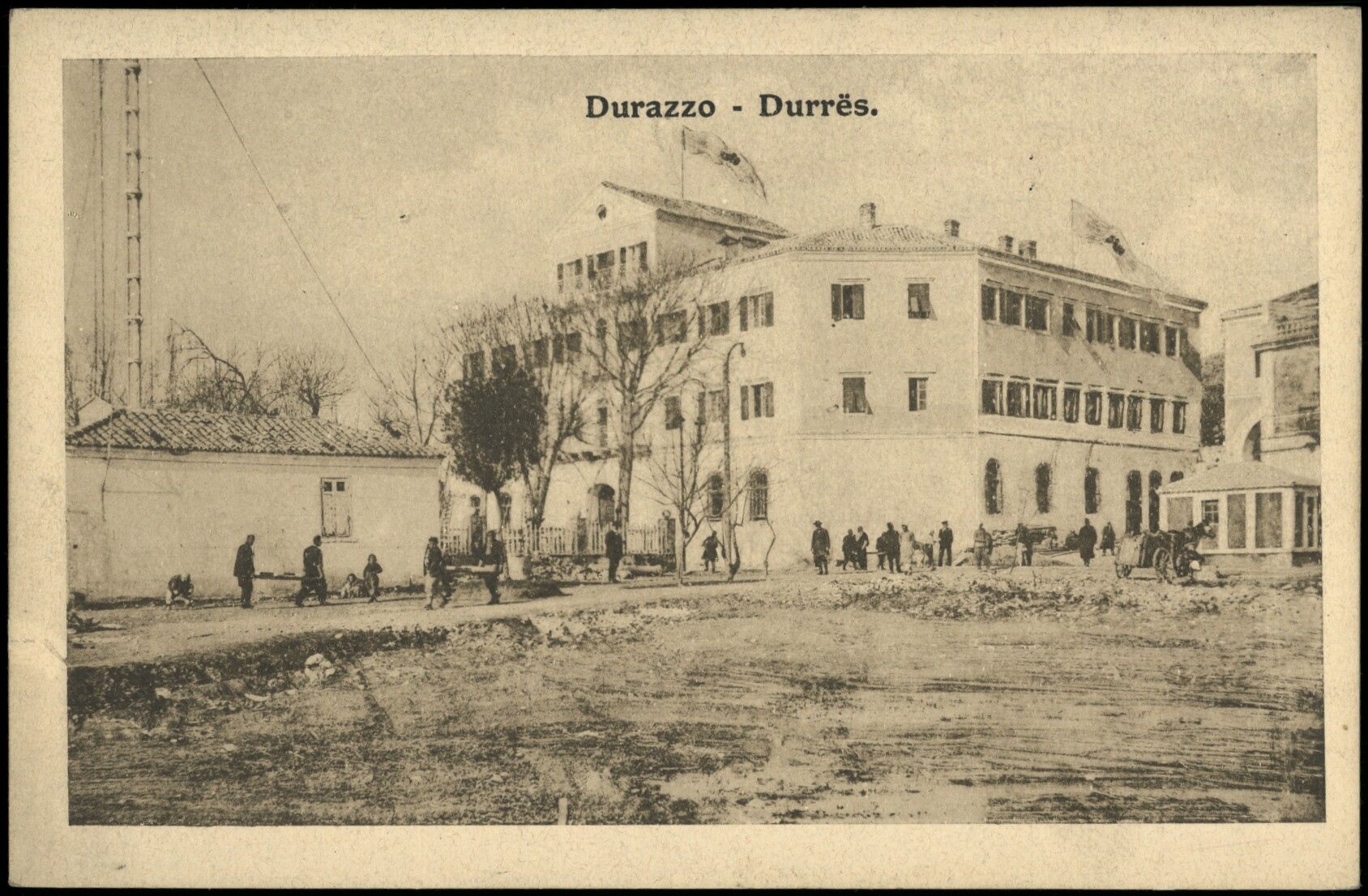
The palace on a postcard

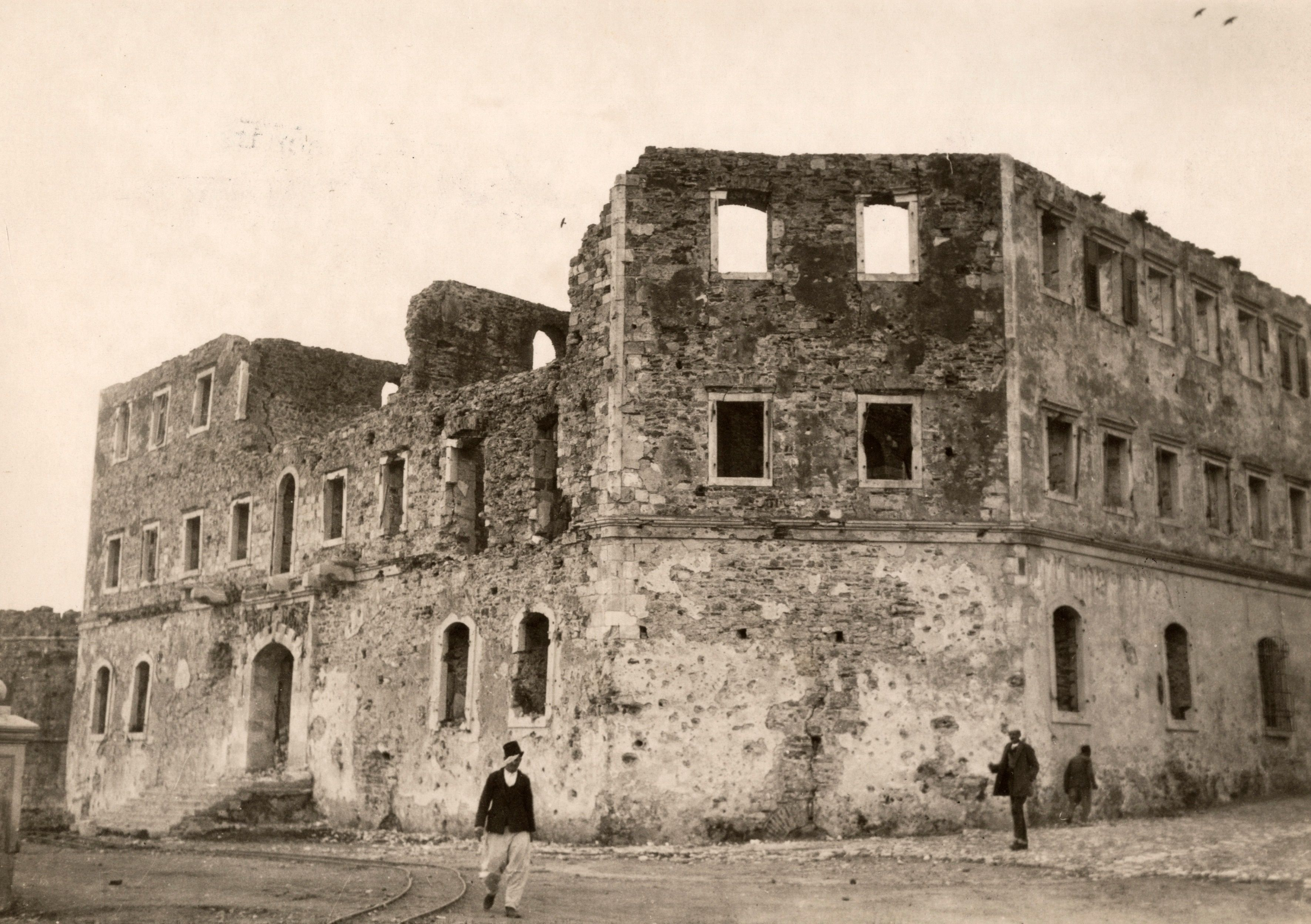
The palace after the bombardment

== See also ==
- Essad Pasha Toptani
- International Gendarmerie

== Literature ==
- Shehi, Eduard (2018). Konaku i Durrësit (in Albanian). Tirana: Akdemia e Studimeve Albanologjike. p. 301. ISBN 978-9928-141-97-2.
