= HMS Defender =

Eight ships of the Royal Navy have borne the name HMS Defender:

- HMS Defender (1797), a 12-gun Courser-class gun-brig launched in 1797 and on the Navy List until 1802.
- HMS Defender (1804), a 14-gun Archer-class gun-brig launched in 1804 and wrecked in 1809.
- HMS Defender (1809), an 8-gun lugger, previously the French privateer Beau Marseille. She was captured in 1809 by HMS Royalist and sold in 1814.
- HMS Defender (1883), a second-class colonial-service torpedo boat built in 1883 for service in New Zealand and abandoned at Lyttelton, New Zealand sometime after 1900. Her remains can be seen at the Torpedo Boat Museum, Magazine Bay, Lyttelton.
- HMS Defender (1911), an Acheron-class destroyer, launched in 1911, present at the Battle of Jutland and sold in 1921.
- HMS Defender (H07), a D-class destroyer launched in 1932 and sunk in 1941.
- HMS Defender (D114), a Daring-class destroyer launched in 1950 and broken up in 1972.
- HMS Defender (D36), a Type 45 destroyer launched on 21 October 2009.

The name was also used between 1941(?) and 1945 for a small shore establishment just outside Liverpool.

== Battle honours ==
Ships named Defender have earned the following battle honours:

- Heligoland, 1914
- Dogger Bank, 1915
- Jutland, 1916
- Calabria, 1940
- Spartivento, 1940
- Matapan, 1941
- Malta Convoys, 1941
- Greece, 1941
- Crete, 1941
- Libya, 1941
