= USS Nelson =

Gleaves-class destroyer

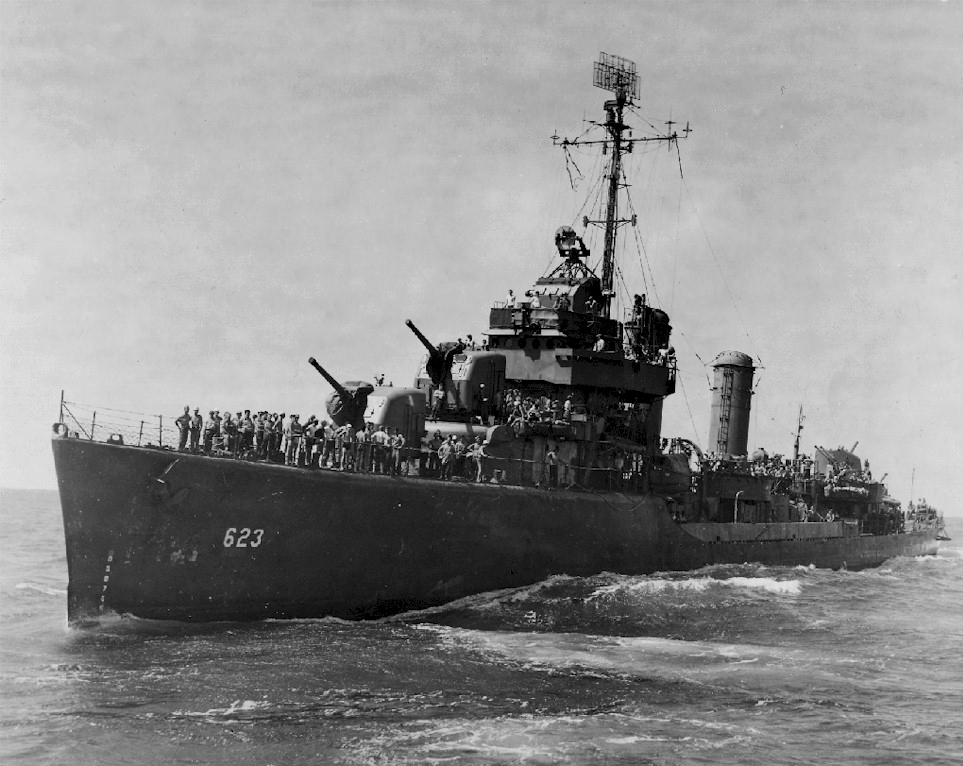
- USS Nelson (DD-623)

History

United States
- Name: Nelson
- Namesake: Charles P. Nelson
- Builder: Federal Shipbuilding and Drydock Company
- Laid down: 7 May 1942
- Launched: 15 September 1942
- Commissioned: 26 November 1942
- Decommissioned: January 1947
- Stricken: 1 March 1968
- Fate: Sold 18 July 1969 and; broken up for scrap

General characteristics
- Class & type: Gleaves-class destroyer
- Displacement: 1,630 tons
- Length: 348 ft 3 in (106.15 m)
- Beam: 36 ft 1 in (11.00 m)
- Draft: 11 ft 10 in (3.61 m)
- Propulsion: 50,000 shp (37,000 kW); 4 boilers; 2 propellers
- Speed: 37.4 knots (69 km/h)
- Range: 6,500 nmi (12,000 km; 7,500 mi) at 12 kn (22 km/h; 14 mph)
- Complement: 16 officers, 260 enlisted
- Armament: 4 × 5 in (127 mm)/38 caliber DP guns; 6 × 0.50 in (12.7 mm) machine guns; 2 × twin 40 mm (1.6 in) AA guns; 5 × 20 mm (0.79 in) AA guns, 5 × 21 in (533 mm) torpedo tubes (5 Mark 15 torpedoes); 2 × depth charge tracks, 6 × depth charge projectors

USS Nelson (DD-623), a Gleaves-class destroyer, was the only ship of the United States Navy to be named for Rear Admiral Charles P. Nelson, who served during the Spanish–American War and World War I.

Nelson was laid down on 7 May 1942 at the Federal Shipbuilding and Drydock Company, Kearny, New Jersey and launched on 15 September 1942 sponsored by Mrs. Nelson Stewart, daughter of Rear Admiral Nelson. The ship was commissioned on 26 November 1942.

== Service history ==
After shakedown along the Atlantic coast, Nelson reported to the U.S. Atlantic Fleet on 21 January 1943. Through 29 May, she operated on convoy duty as flagship of Destroyer Squadron 17, making runs to Bermuda, Port of Spain, Trinidad, Dakar, French West Africa; Aruba, Netherlands West Indies; Casablanca; and Gibraltar.

=== Invasion of Sicily, 1943 ===
Upon completion of a short training period at Norfolk, Virginia, Nelson got underway 7 June to take part in the invasion of Sicily. During the crossing she screened the cruiser Boise, arriving at Algiers on 20 June. Serving as flagship for Commander Task Force 81 (TF 81) during the Sicily operation, Nelson was assigned duty with the central part of the Western Task Force. This group was to land assault troops on beachheads near Gela, Sicily, to expand the captured area, and to seize the nearby airfield at Ponte Olivo.

At 02:46 on 10 July the first assault waves hit the Gela beaches. Plunging in through the breakers, the shock troops encountered light opposition. But furious gunfire raked the follow-up waves. Caught in the blue-white glare of searchlights, landing craft were subjected to intense fire, and LCIs took direct hits.

At 03:00 Nelson commenced figure eight patrols to the east of the transports. Shortly after dawn Axis aircraft joined the fight, flying out of the Acate River valley on the eastern coast and attempting to bomb and strafe Allied ships, landing craft, and beaches. Nelson fired sporadically at the planes throughout the day. At 12:30 she received word that the destroyer Maddox had been sunk. Enemy aircraft continued the attack the next day, delivering a high level bombing attack on Nelson's area and obtaining a direct hit on the Liberty ship Robert Rowan. By 23:02 the ships commenced laying a heavy smoke screen, and the Axis attacks were beaten off.

German dive bombers buzzed in on a surprise attack from the northeast at 17:33 on 12 July, dropping bombs and making strafing runs. Nelson splashed one plane at 17:42 and an hour later departed in convoy for Algiers, North Africa.

Returning to the battle area on 17 July, she took up antisubmarine patrol station around Gela and Scoglitti until 23 July, when she returned to Algiers. Later, on 30 July, she escorted troopships into Palermo Harbor on the north coast of Sicily. During this operation she was harassed by constant German air attacks. At 05:48 on 1 August she opened fire on a single plane, splashing it with the third salvo.

Nelson returned to New York on 22 August, where Lt. Comdr. Thomas D. McGrath relieved Lt. Comdr. Riker of command on 3 September. The ship was assigned to North Atlantic convoy runs for the winter. This duty took the destroyer to Belfast, Northern Ireland three times and to Greenock Bay, Scotland, and Gibraltar once each.

=== Invasion of Normandy, 1944 ===
In May 1944 Nelson steamed to England to stage for the coming Normandy invasion. While moored alongside a tanker at Plymouth, England on 24 May, her port screw fouled a mooring buoy, causing extensive damage to the screw and shaft. Nelson was placed in drydock where the screw and shaft, deemed beyond repair, were removed. But the need for fighting ships was so great that Nelson got underway on 2 June with only a starboard screw. At Milford Haven she rendezvoused with a convoy, and by 8 June was in the Normandy assault area.

The next day she steamed into position No. 13 on the "Dixie Line" as part of the anti-submarine and E-boat screen around the Omaha beachhead. E-boats were the German version of PT boats – speedy, agile, hard-hitting, and hard to hit. Armed with 40 mm guns and torpedoes, they specialized in night attacks. On the night of 8/9 June several destroyers on the "Dixie Line" had taken under fire and chased several of these E-boats, sinking two.

Nelson was anchored in position 13 the night of 12 June. Thus far her only contact with the enemy had been in the form of a glide bomb which had exploded harmlessly off the starboard quarter during her first night in the area. At 01:05 on 13 June she made a radar contact, challenged the contact by flashing light, and opened fire. The target slowed, turned away, and split into three distinct blips. The destroyer had loosed ten salvos when a torpedo struck her just aft the No. 4 gun mount blowing off the stern and No. 4 mount (the destroyer's transom is now on display in the Museum of Underwater Wrecks, having been raised from the bottom of the Baie de Seine by the diver Jacques Lemonchois). Maloy stood by to transfer personnel, and Nelson was taken in tow. Twenty-four of her crew were killed or missing and nine wounded. After emergency repairs at Derry, Northern Ireland, where her #2 turret and torpedo tubes were removed as a weight saving/stability measure, the destroyer was towed to Boston where she received a new stern.

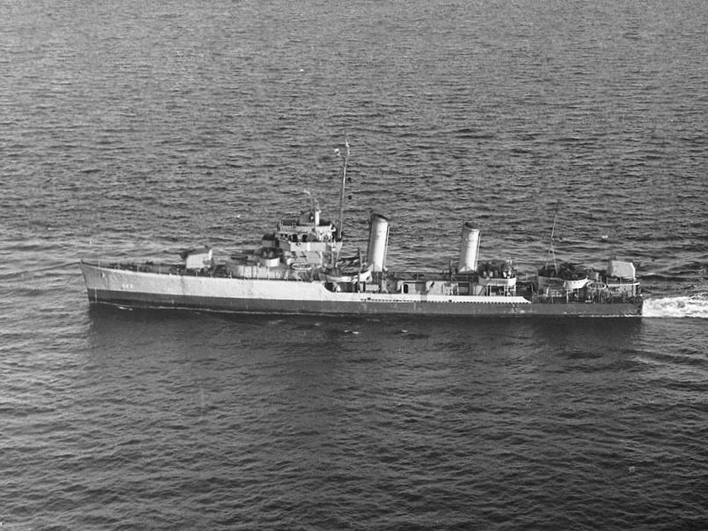
Nelson being towed back to Boston for repairs, after losing her stern from #4 turret aft to a German E-boat torpedo on 13 June 1944, off Normandy.

Extensive repairs completed 23 November 1944, Nelson returned to Atlantic patrol duty. During December she steamed to Plymouth, England, conducting anti-submarine patrol en route. She departed New York late in February 1945 on a convoy run to Oran, Algeria, returning 31 March.

Throughout April and May Nelson served as plane guard and screen for the escort carrier Card, and on 16 May Lt. Comdr. Clark W. Freeman, USNR, relieved Comdr. McGrath as skipper. The destroyer transited the Panama Canal on 1 August en route Pearl Harbor, and then to Tokyo Bay 3–14 September, following Japan's surrender. The last part of September she steamed to Okinawa, Korea, and Singapore, which she reached on 24 August. En route home, she arrived Colombo, Ceylon on 30 August. There, two days later, Lt. Comdr. Scott Lothrop relieved Lt. Comdr. Freeman as commanding officer; and on 3 November, Nelson sailed for New York, via Cape Town, South Africa, arriving 6 December. She got underway again on 29 January 1946 for Charleston, South Carolina. By directive dated January 1947, Nelson was placed out of commission, in reserve, U.S. Atlantic Reserve Fleet, and berthed at Charleston. She was struck from the Naval Register on 1 March 1968 and sold in July 1969.

Nelson earned two battle stars for World War II service.
