= Battle of Durazzo (1918) =

Naval battle fought in the Adriatic Sea during the First World War

Second Battle of Durazzo (1918)
- Part of World War I, Battle of the Mediterranean, Battle of the Adriatic
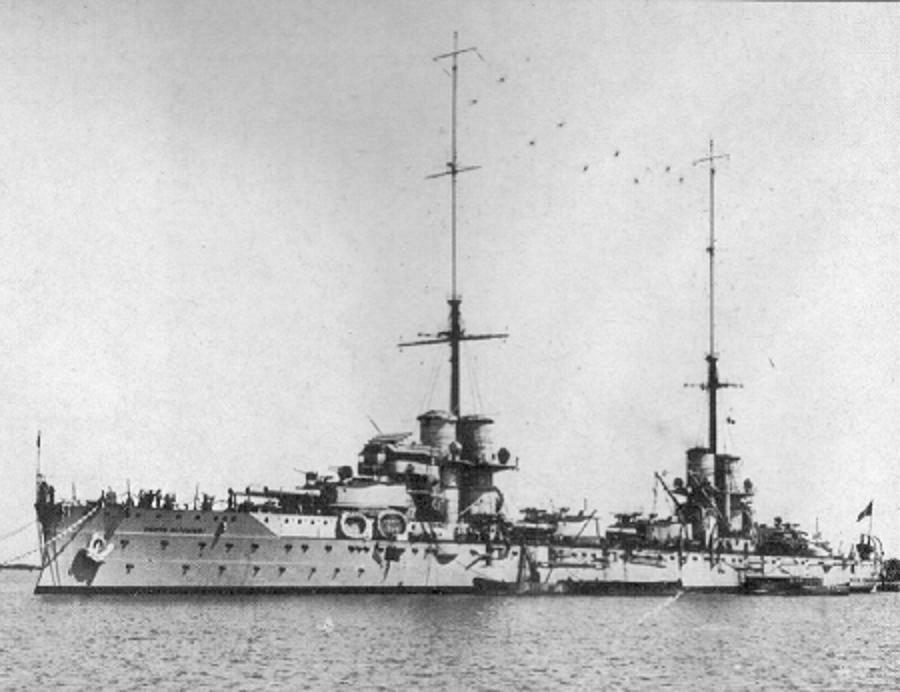
- The Italian dreadnought battleship Dante Alighieri
Date	2 October 1918
Location	Durazzo, Albania, Adriatic Sea 41°18′5″N 19°21′48″E
Result	Allied victory Durazzo evacuated by Austro-Hungarian forces

Belligerents
Allies: Italy; Albania; United Kingdom; United States; Australia	Austria-Hungary

Commanders and leaders
(Kingdom of Italy) Osvaldo Paladini; Charles P. Nelson	(Austria-Hungary) Heinrich Pauer

Strength
(Italy) : 1 battleship 3 armoured cruisers 3 light cruisers 7 destroyers 8 torpedo boats several MAS boats numerous aircraft (United Kingdom) : 5 light cruisers 14 destroyers (United States) : 12 submarine chasers (Australia) : 2 destroyers	Land: 3 shore batteries Sea: 2 destroyers 1 torpedo boat 2 submarines 1 hospital ship

Casualties and losses
5 light cruisers damaged 1 destroyer damaged	1 steamer sunk 2 destroyers damaged 1 torpedo boat damaged 2 submarines damaged 2 steamers damaged 3 shore batteries destroyed

The Second Battle of Durazzo, or the Bombardment of Durazzo was a naval battle fought in the Adriatic Sea during the First World War. A large allied fleet led by the Regia Marina attacked the enemy-held port at Durazzo, Albania. The fleet destroyed the Austro-Hungarian shore defenses and skirmished with a small naval force. Allied forces involved primarily were Italian though British, American and Australian warships also participated. It was the largest naval battle the United States participated in during the war. Most of the city was destroyed in the bombardment.

== Background ==
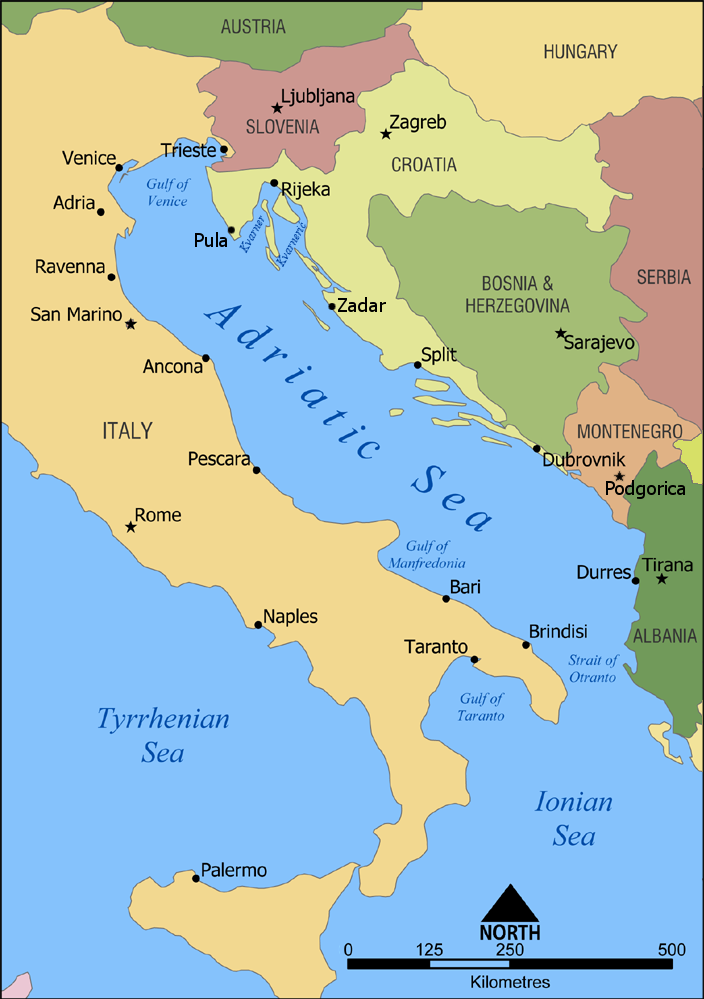
The Adriatic Sea. Durazzo is located on the coast of Albania, known in Albanian as Durrës

From 15 to 29 September 1918, French General Louis Franchet d'Espèrey in command of a large allied army, campaigned in Macedonia. The offensive was a victory and ended with Bulgaria's surrender. Fearing the remaining enemies would fall back on the Austrian-held port of Durazzo for supplies, Franchet d'Espèrey requested that an allied naval fleet be assembled to attack Durazzo and thus prevent the city from supplying retreating enemy forces. Franchet d'Espèrey's request was approved and the Italian Regia Marina accepted the responsibility of leading the attack. Rear Admiral Osvaldo Paladini aboard the cruiser San Marco was to command the operation.

Allied objectives were to bombard Durazzo and attack any Austrian ships in the harbour. The Allies divided their fleet into two forces, one for bombardment and the other for screening the attacking ships from enemy submarines. Allied forces included the Italian battleship Dante Alighieri, which was assigned to the covering force, three Italian armoured cruisers, three Italian light cruisers, five British light cruisers, 14 British destroyers, two Australian destroyers, eight Italian torpedo boats and 12 American submarine chasers under Captain Charles P. Nelson and Lieutenant Commander E.H. Bastedo. Allied aircraft was also involved along with several Italian MAS boats. The two Australian destroyers were HMAS Swan and Warrego.

Before the battle began, the Austro-Hungarian government decided to withdraw most of their warships from Durazzo. Only two destroyers, one torpedo boat and two U-boats opposed the allied fleet though the Austrian troops on shore manned at least three different shore batteries which dueled with the allied ships. Also in port was a hospital ship. Austrian forces were commanded by Lieutenant Commander Heinrich Pauer.

== Battle ==
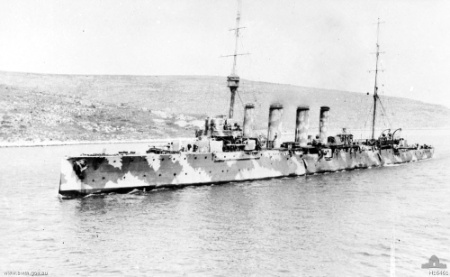
HMS Weymouth in Greece during the Battle of the Mediterranean

The Second Battle of Durazzo began on the morning of 2 October 1918, when British and Italian aircraft attacked by bombarding enemy troop concentrations and artillery batteries while the fleet was still steaming across the Adriatic. Afterwards, several of the Italian and British cruisers formed a two-echelon line to begin their bombardment from about 8,000 yards (7,315 m) off the coast. Meanwhile, the MAS boats and some American and British vessels attacked the three Austro-Hungarian naval ships, SMS Dinara, Scharfschütze and No. 87.

The three warships sailed back and forth around Durazzo harbour firing their guns and dodging torpedoes and shell fire. Torpedo boat No. 87 and the two destroyers were chased by the Allied destroyer force as they fled north along the coast, but they managed to escape. Scharfschütze took some minor hits and suffered three dead and five wounded while torpedo boat No. 87 was struck by a torpedo that failed to explode. Dinara managed to escape unscathed. The shelling of the port was carried out by the Italian armoured cruisers San Giorgio, San Marco and Pisa. Three merchantmen, Graz, Herzegovina and Stambul, were hit. Stambul sank but the two others escaped complete destruction. The Austro-Hungarian hospital ship Baron Call was stopped and searched by British destroyers before being allowed to proceed. Most of the American forces were assigned to the covering force and at the battle's beginning were used to chart a clear path through a sea mine field off Durazzo. A few of the submarine chasers took fire from shore batteries at this time, but none were damaged. They were then assigned to screen the other allied ships from submarine attacks. Patrolling to the north and to the south of the battle area, the Americans engaged the two Austro-Hungarian U-boats U-29 and U-31. At 11:05, a sailor on the submarine chaser No. 129 spotted U-29, which was then depth-charged for 15 minutes and damaged heavily, but she nevertheless survived the encounter.

U-31 was also depth charged and survived as well. At one point, No. 129 was fired on by the enemy shore batteries, the closest shot landed about 50 yards (46 m) from the vessel, but the Americans suffered no casualties in the battle. Later, American forces reported sinking the two submarines but this was not the case. The submarines managed to damage at least one allied light cruiser; HMS Weymouth was struck by a torpedo from U-31 under a Lieutenant Rigele, which blew off a large portion of her stern and killed four men. Weymouth was shelling inland facilities along with four other British cruisers when the torpedo struck home. She spent the remainder of the war under repair. The other British light cruisers are known to have been lightly damaged by shore battery fire before they were silenced or disabled. A British destroyer was also hit by a torpedo. The battle ended by 01:30 on 2–3 October; from the beginning of the action civilians started to flee the city, and by 11 October the once-busy port was silent. On 10 October, the last Austro-Hungarian units had left Durrës, which was eventually occupied by the Italians on 16 October.

The Allied bombardment targeted the small port area and its wooden piers. Although civilians started to flee the city at the start of the bombardment, many casualties were inflicted on the innocent and neutral population. The Old City being adjacent to the harbour was largely destroyed, including the primary public buildings. The Royal Palace of Durrës, briefly the residence of Prince Wilhelm zu Wied, Albania's Prince, was completely destroyed.

== See also ==
- Battle of Durazzo (1915)
- Otranto Barrage

== Bibliography ==
- Halpern, Paul G., Koburger Jr., Charles W., The Central Powers in the Adriatic, 1914–1918: War in a Narrow Sea Westport, CT (2001), ISBN 0-275-97071-X
- Halpern, Paul G. (1995). A Naval History of World War I. Routledge, p. 176. ISBN 1-85728-498-4
- Howarth, Steven, To Shining Sea: A History of the United States Navy 1776–1991, New York: Random House, (1991), ISBN 0-394-57662-4
