= Naval warfare in the Mediterranean during World War I =

Naval warfare in the Mediterranean (1914–1918)
- Part of Naval warfare of World War I
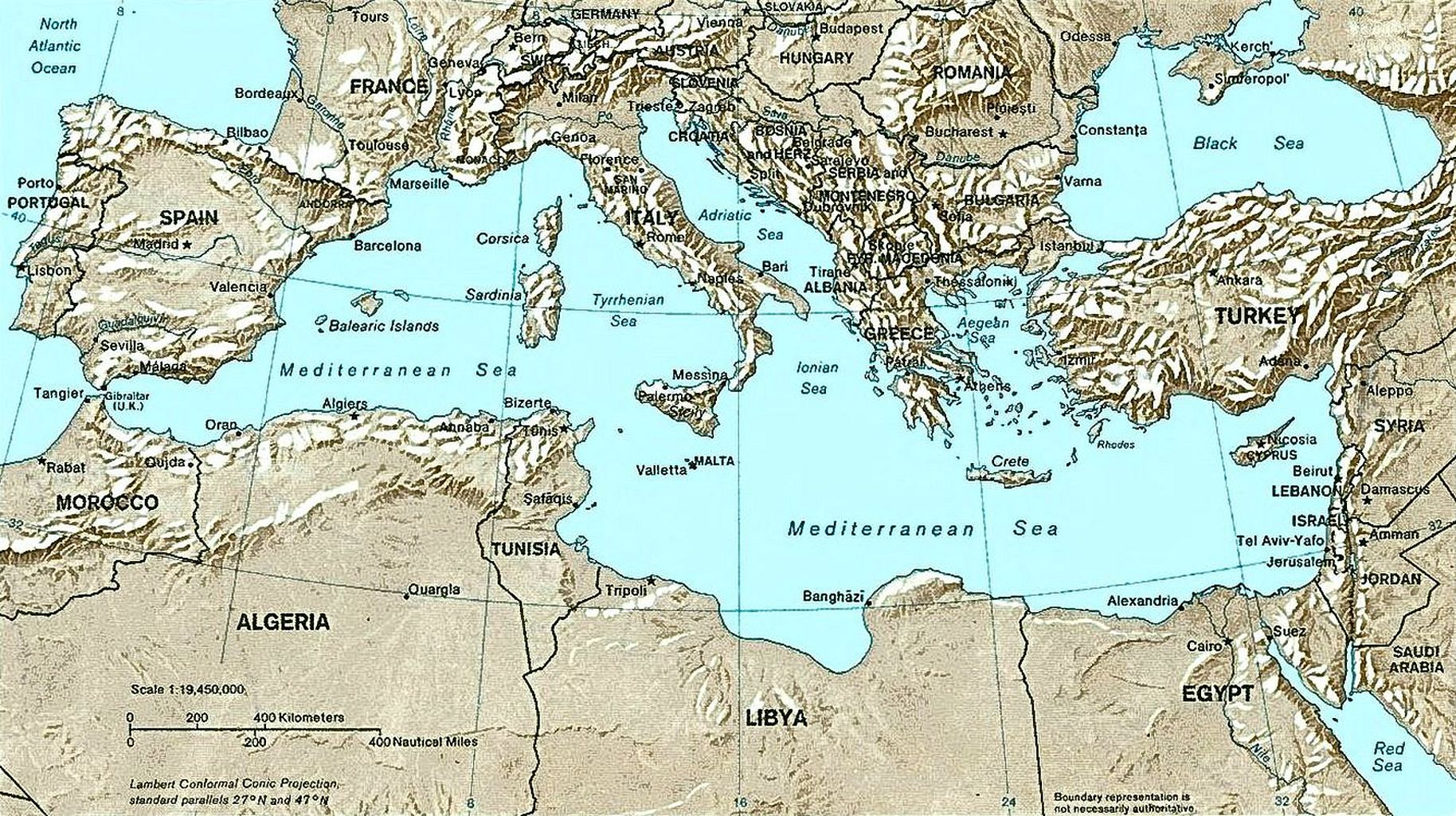
- The Mediterranean Sea and surrounding regions
Date	August 1914 – October 1918
Location	Mediterranean Sea, Adriatic Sea
Result	Allied victory

Belligerents
Regia Marina; French Navy; Royal Navy; United States Navy; Hellenic Navy; Imperial Japanese Navy; Imperial Russian Navy	Austro-Hungarian Navy; Imperial German Navy; Ottoman Navy; Bulgarian Navy

Naval warfare in the Mediterranean during World War I took place between the naval forces of the Entente and the Central Powers in the Mediterranean Sea between 1914 and 1918.

== Austro-Hungarian Imperial and Royal Navy ==
Austria-Hungary was a medium-sized naval power in 1914. It had a coastline from between Venice and Trieste (in present-day Italy) to below Cattaro in Montenegro. The Austro-Hungarian Navy had nine pre-dreadnought and four brand new dreadnought Tegetthoff-class battleships, armoured cruisers, protected cruisers, light cruisers, destroyers, large numbers of fast torpedo-boats and a number of submarines. In addition, the Germans managed to send some further U-boats to the Mediterranean which operated from Austrian naval bases, initially under the Austrian navy flag, later under the German navy flag.

== Italian Regia Marina (Royal Navy) ==
The Kingdom of Italy during World War I had six dreadnought battleships (Dante Alighieri as a prototype, Giulio Cesare, Conte di Cavour and Leonardo da Vinci of the Conte di Cavour class, Andrea Doria and Duilio of the Andrea Doria class). Only four saw service in WWI and none were engaged in combat.

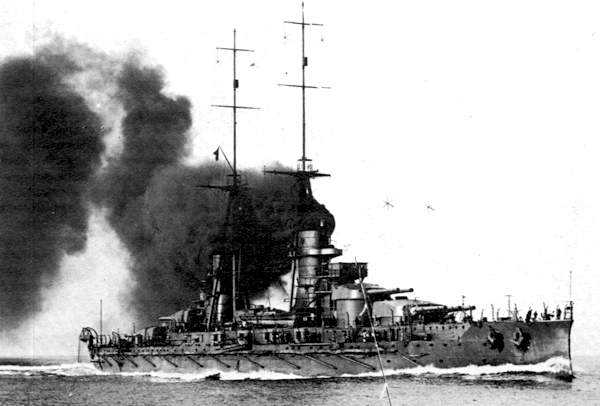
Giulio Cesare, Otranto 1915

During the war, both the Italian Royal Navy and the Austro-Hungarian Navy kept their most modern capital ships inside their bases (Pola and Cattaro for the Austrian Fleet, Brindisi and Taranto for the Italian fleet), leaving mostly submarines, destroyers, torpedo boats and scout cruisers to do any fighting. The so-called Adriatic Campaign of World War I consisted mainly of relatively minor fights between light forces, such as the Battle of Durazzo and the Battle of the Otranto Straits, a few coastal bombardments (such as the Austro-Hungarian bombardment of Ancona and the Allied bombardment of Durazzo), wider-ranging German and Austro-Hungarian submarine warfare into the Adriatic and the Mediterranean, and Italian use of new weapons (mainly MAS and human torpedoes) that were successful in the sinking of three Austrian battleships.

For most of the war the Italian and Austro-Hungarian navies each kept a relatively passive watch over their counterparts. The Italian fleet lost the pre-dreadnought battleship Benedetto Brin, which exploded at Brindisi (27 September 1915); and on August 2, 1916, the Italian dreadnought Leonardo da Vinci exploded at Taranto, killing 249 of its crew. Reminiscent of the USS Maine, the events was widely reported in the Italian press, which immediately blamed Austrian or German saboteurs. The cause of the explosion was thought by others as having been unstable lignite, but the Italian counterintelligence later discovered an Austrian saboteur network, based in Zurich, which was responsible for the sinking of the two battleships.

=== Italian sinkings of Austrian battleships ===
In December 1917, Luigi Rizzo with his MAS motor-torpedo boat sank the Austro-Hungarian pre-dreadnought battleship SMS Wien, which was at anchor inside Trieste harbour.

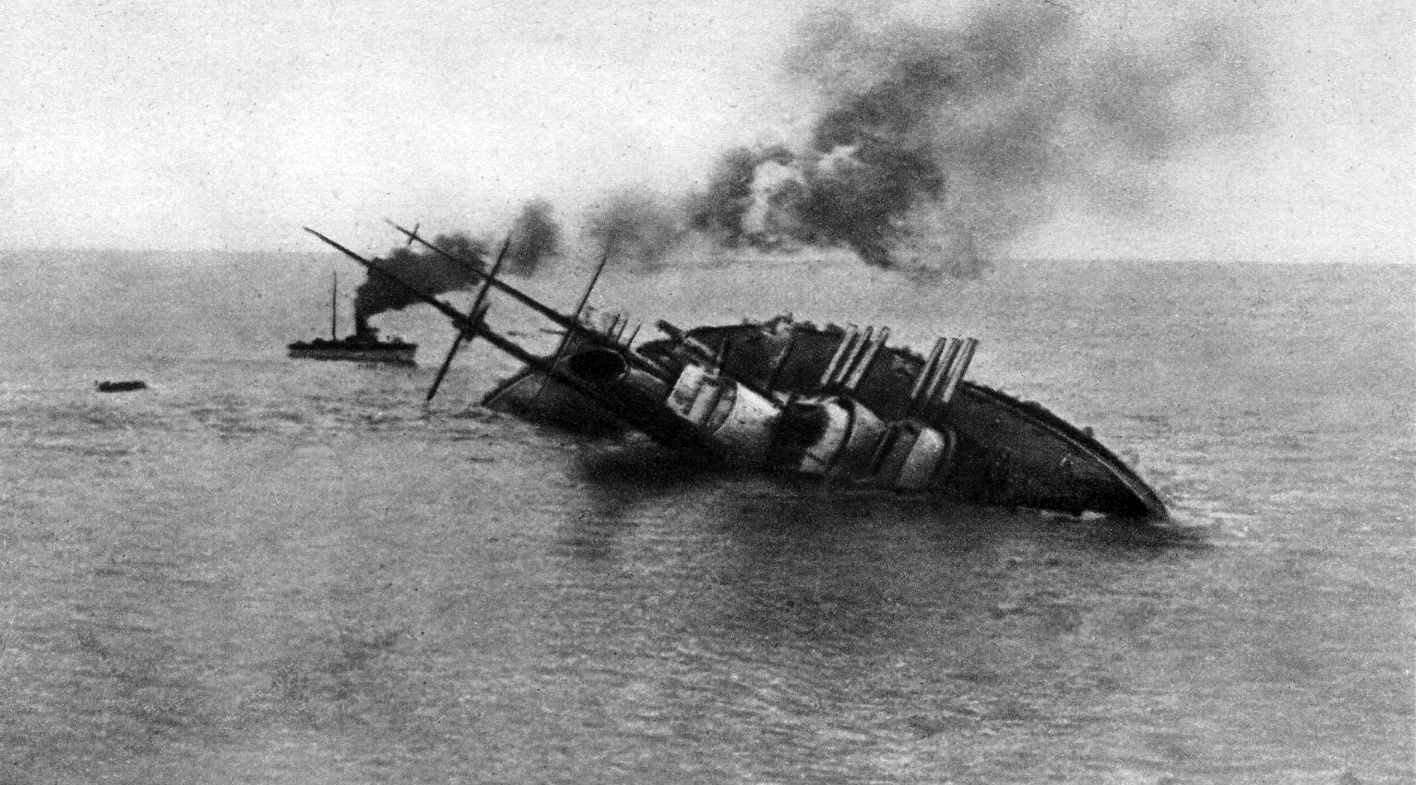
SMS Szent István was one of the four Austro-Hungarian dreadnoughts, sunk on 10 June 1918 by a torpedo attack by Italian Luigi Rizzo's MAS

In the early hours of June 10, 1918, Admiral Horthy and a number of ships were heading for the Otranto Barrage to make a surprise attack. As the fairly new dreadnaught the SMS Szent István was steaming past the island of Premuda off the coast of Dalmatia, a small Italian motor boat carrying two torpedoes, again commanded by Luigi Rizzo on its way back to Italy, suddenly saw the battleship approaching with her escort. Approaching at high speed, the MAS fired both torpedoes and hit the battleship, before escaping unharmed. Despite valiant efforts by the crew with the pumps, and attempts to tow it to a port, after several hours water levels could not be contained and the ship capsized.

On the night between 31 October and 1 November 1918, a small Italian human torpedo, called a "mignatta", which carried two men, entered the base of Pola and placed a limpet mine below the hull of the anchored battleship SMS Viribus Unitis. Unknown to them, the entire Austrian fleet had just been handed over to the new National Council of Slovenes, Croats and Serbs; this had happened in the evening of 31 October, when the Italian ships assigned to the operation had already left the port, and thus could not be informed. After placing the mines, the two Italian operators were captured, and they informed the crew that the ship was going to sink, although they did not reveal that they had placed mines on the hull; however, the explosions were delayed and the crew started reboarding the ship, believing they were lying. Shortly thereafter, the mines exploded, causing the Viribus Unitis to sink. The Slav National Council made no efforts to raise the ship, as Italy occupied the region only a few days later.

== Campaigns ==
In the Mediterranean Sea, the war began with most of the large, but elderly French fleet deployed on escort duty to protect convoys across the Mediterranean from the smaller, but newer Austrian fleet and cover against possible Italian entry into the war on Austria's side. Several British ships were also sent to Malta to reinforce the British Mediterranean Fleet. Germany also had a small presence in the Mediterranean with a few ships based at the Austrian naval base of Pola (in current day Croatia) and at the commencement of hostilities, their powerful cruiser SMS Goeben and the light cruiser SMS Breslau, were patrolling the western Mediterranean. The German ships had not found the French convoys, so proceeded to bombard the cities of Bizerte and Bône in the French protectorate of Tunisia. Pursued by larger French and British forces, the Goeben and Breslau ran for Turkey, where they were nominally transferred to the Ottoman Navy when the Ottoman Empire entered the war on the Central Powers side, and fought several battles against the Russian Black Sea Fleet until Russia's surrender in 1917.

After the Kingdom of Italy entered the war on the Allied side in 1915, the strategy of the Allies was to blockade the Adriatic at the Otranto Straits and monitor the movements of the Austrian fleet. In general, this strategy was successful, but the Austrians attacked the barrage on several occasions sinking many vessels: on the night of the 26/27 April 1915 the Austrian submarine U-5, commanded by Lieutenant Georg von Trapp (of Sound of Music fame), sank the French cruiser Léon Gambetta.

The Austrians and Germans were also able to send submarines out into the Mediterranean where they did some damage. Total Allied warship losses to Austrian and German submarines were: two battleships, two armored cruisers, five destroyers, and two submarines (in addition to many damaged navy ships and sunk freighters). The primary sea bases for the Austrian fleet in the Adriatic were Pola (in Istria) and Cattaro (in southern Dalmatia).

The Allied navies were able to sail relatively freely throughout the Mediterranean by keeping the Central Powers' surface units bottled up in either the Adriatic or at Constantinople. This freedom of movement was tremendously important for the Allies, as they were not only able to keep open their supply routes (to Egypt for example), but to also evacuate the remains of the Serbian Army from capture and even launch (and supply) amphibious invasions at Gallipoli in 1915 and Salonika in 1916.

In 1915, the major fleet action was the failed Allied attempt to knock the Ottoman Empire out of the war by an attack on Constantinople. The Allies needed to pass the Dardanelles strait in order to supply Russia. The Battle of Gallipoli lasted for most of the year but was unsuccessful. An initial naval assault was defeated by mines and coastal fortresses, and the subsequent land assault was also defeated, but with heavy casualties on both sides.

After Gallipoli, the only significant naval battle occurred on May 15, 1917 when three Austrian cruisers under Captain Miklós Horthy staged a raid on the Otranto Barrage, an Allied naval blockade of the Strait of Otranto. The raid was a partial success but the raiders were nearly destroyed by a shell hit which knocked out an engine on the Austrian cruiser SMS Novara. With heavier Allied forces closing in, the Austrians returned to Pola. The Austrians then decided to raid patrol boats guarding the Otranto Straits between Italy, Corfu and Albania. For further details see the battle of the Otranto Barrage.

== Secondary campaigns and interventions ==
=== From the Allies ===
Allied fleets also played a role in coercing the Greek government to join the Allies and later supply the campaigns in Palestine and Macedonia. Although Germany was able to gain control of the Black Sea and part of the Russian fleet after the collapse of the Russian Empire, they were never able to break out into the Aegean. The German–Turkish fleet finally sortied into the Aegean in 1918 at the Battle of Imbros, but after destroying two British monitors sailed into a minefield. As a result, the Breslau was sunk and the Goeben almost followed that fate, but the captain was able to run the ship aground and beach it before capsizing. The Goeben was not repaired until after the war and what Ottoman naval assets that remained were kept bottled up in the Black Sea.

Allied fleets occupied Constantinople briefly after the Armistice of Mudros, until the new Turkish Republic under Mustafa Kemal took back control of the city in 1923.

Allied ships did continue to intervene in Russia after the war ended, bringing expeditionary forces and supplies via the Mediterranean to the White armies in southern Russia.

Romania, a member of the Allies, had at least 1 armed merchant ship in the Mediterranean. On 1 February 1917, near Gironde, a U-boat surfaced near the Romanian merchant București, the latter being armed with two 120 mm guns. A short artillery duel ensued, between the merchant's aft gun (manned by officer Ciocaș Mihail) and the submarine's deck gun. Eventually, a shell from the merchant's gun fell 50 meters away from the submarine, prompting the U-boat to submerge and retreat.

Japan, an ally of Great Britain, sent a total of 12 destroyers to the Mediterranean starting in April 1917 (later reinforced by two loaned from the Royal Navy) which formed the 2nd Special Squadron (Japanese Navy). The Japanese ships were very effective in patrol and anti-submarine activity (The Japanese Navy spent 72 percent of their time at sea compared with 60 percent by the British and about 45 percent by the French and Italian Navy). Japan suffered 68 dead and heavy damage on the destroyer Sakaki, torpedoed by Austrian submarine U-27.

=== From the Central Powers ===
The Bulgarian Navy, since 1915, developed an independent naval branch of its own in the Mediterranean Sea to defend its territories of Belomorie (in the current Greek province of Eastern Macedonia and Thrace), which was called the Bulgarian White Sea Fleet and patrolled in the former Bulgarian coastal territories in the Aegean Sea. On 1916, that fleet modernized as it got their first submarines its first permanently operating military ship, Iskra. The Bulgarian Mediterranean participation resulted in the defense of Dedeagach (placing a compound of 52 mines in front of the city) against a bombardment by English, French and Russian ships. On February 6, 1917, the Bulgarians shot down an Allied seaplane in the Aegean. On May 4, 1917, the mobilized English trawler "Lord Salisbury" sank in the Mediterranean due to mines laid by the Bulgarians. After the Armistice of Thessalonica, along with the Bulgarian territories in the White Sea, this entire fleet came under French administration.

Austro-Hungarian navy lost nine submarines during the war: five sunk by the Italian navy (U-10, U-12, U-16, U-20, U-23), one by Italian and French units (U-30), one by British units (U-3).

== Sources ==
- Falls, Cyril (1961). The Great War. Capricorn Books.
- Halpern, Paul G. (1995). A Naval History of World War I. Routledge. ISBN 1-85728-498-4.
- Austrian Navy WWI downloaded from Naval-History.net (May 2017)
- Mediterranean Campaign downloaded from Naval-History.net (May 2017)
