= USS Leonidas (AD-7) =

Tender of the United States Navy

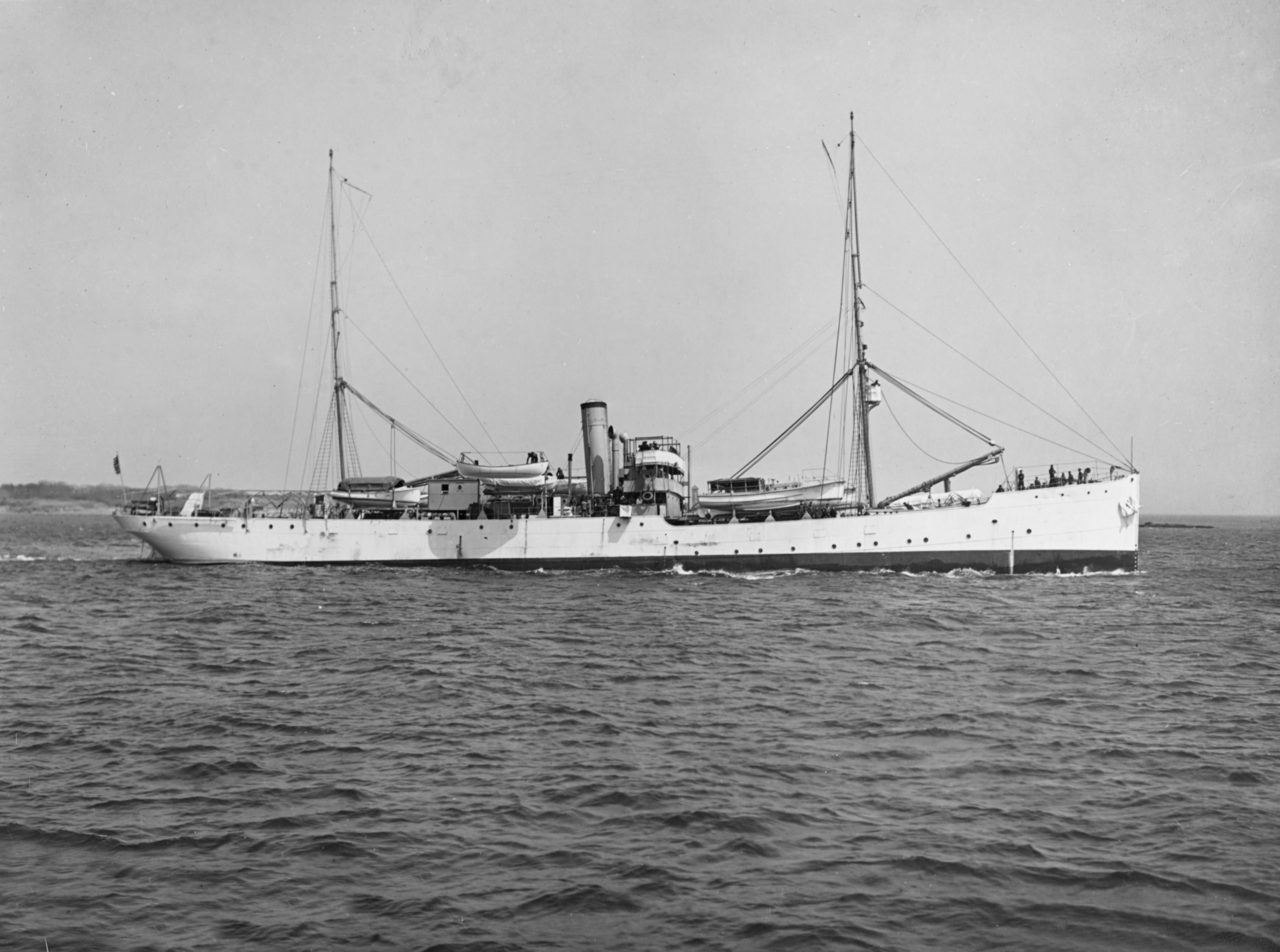
- Leonidas (AD-7) underway on 22 April 1914, while serving as a survey ship.

History

United States
- Name: USS Leonidas
- Namesake: Leonidas I
- Builder: S P Austin & Son Ltd.
- Laid down: 1897
- Launched: 23 March 1898
- Acquired: 16 April 1898
- Commissioned: 21 May 1898
- Decommissioned: 27 December 1898
- Recommissioned: 8 November 1900
- Decommissioned: 15 February 1909
- Recommissioned: 11 June 1909
- Decommissioned: 3 May 1912
- Recommissioned: 1 April 1914
- Decommissioned: 28 November 1921
- Fate: Sold 5 June 1922
- Notes: Collier 1898–1912; Survey ship 1914–1917; Destroyer tender 1918–1921

General characteristics
- Type: Destroyer tender
- Displacement: 4,264 long tons (4,332 t)
- Length: 264 ft 3 in (80.54 m)
- Beam: 39 ft 3 in (11.96 m)
- Draft: 21 ft (6.4 m)
- Speed: 9.5 knots (17.6 km/h; 10.9 mph)
- Complement: 52 officers and enlisted (collier)
- Armament: 2 × 3-pounder guns

USS Leonidas (AD-7) was a ship of the United States Navy named for Leonidas I, a king of Sparta, the second United States naval vessel to bear the name. During her career, she served as a collier, survey ship, and destroyer tender.

== Construction, acquisition, and commissioning ==
Originally built as Elizabeth Holland by S. P. Austin & Son, Ltd., Sunderland, England, in 1897–1898, she was acquired by the U.S. Navy from Samuel P. Holland, London, on 16 April 1898. She was commissioned at New York City on 21 May 1898.

== Service history ==
=== Collier, 1898–1912 ===
Converted into a collier for duty with the newly established Navy Fleet Train, Leonidas departed New York on 30 May 1898 on a coaling voyage to Key West, Florida, and following her return to Norfolk, Virginia in mid-June, sailed again on the 23rd for Cuba and Jamaica, supplying occupation troops and naval units. Putting into League Island Navy Yard, Philadelphia on 15 December, she decommissioned on the 27th and remained there in reserve for nearly two years.

Reactivated on 8 November 1900 she served with the Collier Service, carrying coal to naval ships and stations along the Atlantic coast and in the West Indies through 1908. Decommissioning at Portsmouth Navy Yard in Kittery, Maine, from 15 February to 11 June 1909, the ship resumed her service as an Atlantic Fleet Auxiliary. In 1912, the Leonidas carried several tons of relics retrieved from the USS Maine, including the battleship's main mast, to the United States. She was placed out of service on 3 May 1912 at Portsmouth to fit out for duty as a survey ship.

=== Survey ship, 1914–1917 ===
Recommissioned on 1 April 1914, Leonidas sailed from Portsmouth via Boston to survey the coast of Panama. From that date until 24 April 1917 the converted survey ship made four surveying trips to the Caribbean, charting the coasts of Panama, Honduras, and Nicaragua and making general observations on climate and terrain.

With the outbreak of World War I, she took up patrol duty in the Caribbean, searching for possible enemy submarine bases in Central America. As part of the Caribbean Detachment, Patrol Force, Atlantic Fleet, Leonidas remained in the West Indies until sailing for home 4 September, arriving Portsmouth 30 October.

=== Tender, 1918–1922 ===
There the survey ship was converted, once again, this time into a tender capable of supplying two squadrons of submarine chasers. Leonidas sailed for the Mediterranean on 8 March 1918 via New York, Bermuda, the Azores and Gibraltar, arriving Corfu, Italy on 8 June and remaining there tending her submarine chasers guarding the area from submarine attack. After the Armistice on 20 November, the tender sailed for home via ports in Italy, the Riviera, and Spain, and escorted a convoy of submarine chasers from the Azores to Bermuda. She twice more escorted homeward bound small craft before arriving New York on 8 September.

Following short voyages to New London and Newport in support of her submarine chasers, the ship sailed for Key West on 11 October and operated off the southern U.S. coast as tender for the destroyers of Reserve Destroyer Squadron 1, Atlantic Fleet, out of Charleston, South Carolina until sailing for New York and arriving 19 May 1921. Leonidas sailed to Newport for duty 1 June to 17 October and, after returning to New York, sailed for Norfolk on the 28th, arriving two days later. She decommissioned there on 28 November, and was sold on 5 June 1922 to Ammunitions Products Corporation of Washington, D.C. as the SS Elizabeth Holland.

== See also ==
- List of auxiliaries of the United States Navy
