= Flank speed =

American reference to a ship's true maximum speed

Flank speed is an American nautical term referring to a ship's true maximum speed but it is not equivalent to the term full speed ahead. Usually, flank speed is reserved for situations in which a ship finds itself in imminent danger, such as coming under attack by aircraft or torpedoes. Flank speed is very demanding of fuel and often unsustainable because of propulsion system limitations. The related term emergency may not be any faster than flank but it indicates that the ship should be brought up to maximum speed in the shortest possible time.

Other speeds include one-third, two-thirds, standard and full. One-third and two-thirds are fractions of standard speed. Full is greater than standard but not as great as flank. In surface ship nuclear marine propulsion, the difference between full speed and flank speed is of lesser significance, because vessels can be run at or very near their true maximum speed for a long time with little regard for fuel expended, an important consideration for oil-fueled ships.

"Flank speed" is exclusively an American phrase and as such is unknown in Commonwealth ("Ensign") navies. The Commonwealth navies use the following telegraph commands:

- Slow ahead/astern, the number of revolutions is standardized for the individual ship and is unstated
- Half ahead/astern, accompanied by an order for a power setting (e.g., "half ahead both engines, revolutions 1,500")
- Full speed ahead/astern. This is reserved for emergencies and as such the word "speed" is included to distinguish it from the other commands mentioned. No power setting is expressed, it being implicit that maximum power is required

The term's origin is difficult to verify but likely comes from simplifying the term "flanking speed" in which naval vessels would attempt to get around the sides or "flanks" of another vessel's vulnerable locations.

== See also ==
- Engine order telegraph
