= Monounios =

Illyrian king

- King
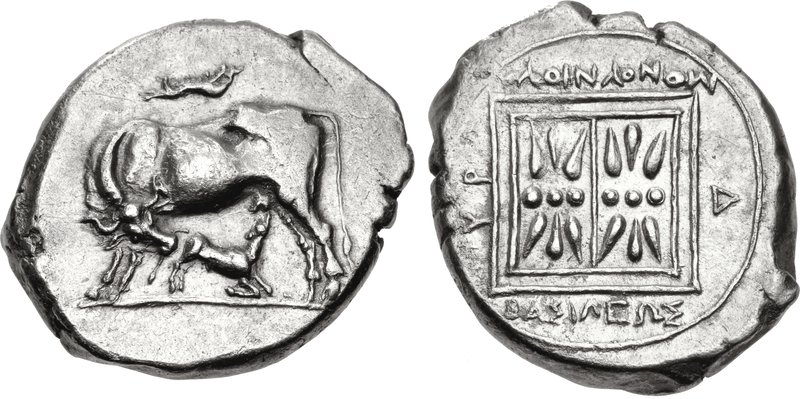
- King Monounios' silver stater from Dyrrhachion
- Reign: c. 290 – 270 BC
- Predecessor: Bardylis II
- Successor: Mytilos

Monounios or Monunius (Ancient Greek: Μονούνιος; Latin: Monunius; ruled c. 290 – 270 BC) was an Illyrian king who reigned in southern Illyria, in the territory of the Taulantii, around the hinterland of Dyrrhachion and Apollonia. He is the first known Illyrian king to have struck his own silver coins, which were minted in Dyrrhachion. The fact that Monounios' coins were struck in the city mint of Dyrrhachion stresses that he exercised to some extent his authority over the city, as did his successor and probably son Mytilos later.

Monounios is considered the successor of Glaucias of Taulantii, and probably his son. His realm also included the southern part of the later kingdom of Agron and Teuta. Monounios must have been a powerful Illyrian king who conceivably increased his dominion during the period when Pyrrhus of Epirus was in Italy. Monounios was involved in the dynastic struggles in Macedon, waging war as an ally of Lysimachus' son, Ptolemy Epigonos, against Ptolemy Ceraunos, most likely from spring 280 BC until at least the early 279 BC. A helmet with the inscribed name of the king was found around Lake Ohrid.

== Biography ==
Monounios is considered the successor of Glaucias of Taulantii, whose reign lasted until at least 295 BC. Between 284 and 282 BC southern Illyria was threatened by Pyrrhus of Epirus, who succeeded in seizing part of the country, including the city of Apollonia and the territory of certain tribes. It has been suggested that Pyrrhus' operations in Illyria ended in 282 BC. Already succeeding to face Epirote offensive in the previous years, Pyrrhus' departure to Italy in 280 BC enabled Monounios to strengthen his power politically and economically, consolidatating the structures of the Illyrian state.

Minting his own coinage reflected Monounios' financial power. The Illyrian king aligned with the most valuable currency in the region – the silver stater of Dyrrachion – and transformed it, in stages, into his own currency. The fact that Monounios' coins were struck in the city mint of Dyrrhachion stresses that he exercised to some extent his authority over the city, as did his successor and probably son Mytilos later.

Monounios was involved in the dynastic struggles in Macedon, waging war as an ally of Lysimachus' son, Ptolemy Epigonos, against Ptolemy Ceraunos, as reported by Pompeius Trogus (1st century BC). The war likely began in spring 280 BC, just a few months after the murder of Ptolemy Epigonos' brothers, and lasted at least until the Gallic invasion in early 279. The situation in 279 BC was seemingly a large-scale regional conflict, which besides the "Celts" and Macedonians, also involved ethnic Illyrians led by king Monounios and Ptolemy Epigonos, a pretender to the Macedonian throne.

A helmet with the inscribed name of the king (ΜΟΝΟΥΝΙΟΥ [ΒΑ]ΣΙΛΕΩ[Σ]) was found in the area of Lake Ohrid. Dating back to the 3rd century BC, these inscriptions of Monounios are considered the oldest known in the area. It is thought that Monounios was buried in the Royal Tombs of Selca e Poshtme.

== Minting of coins ==
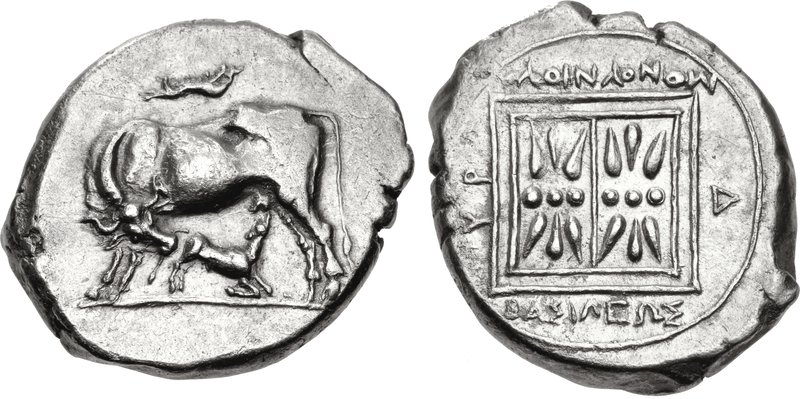
Silver stater of the Illyrian king Monounios, c. 280 BC from the Dyrrhachion mint. Cow and suckling calf, rev. double stellate pattern, inscription: ΒΑΣΙΛΕΩΣ ΜΟΝΟΥΝΙΟΥ and the city symbol ΔΥΡ.

Even though the Illyrians had minted coins well before the 3rd century BC, Monounios is the first Illyrian king to issue his own coins in 280 BC. Monounios' mint of silver coinage brought an important financial resource under state control. The royal staters, with the legend 'Basileos Monuniou' (of King Monounios), were a copy of the coins of Durrës, the place where they were minted. The coins of Monounios differed only in having the jaw of the boar set over the cow, as a symbol of the royal Illyrian name. The mint also had the abbreviated name ΔΥΡ (for Durrës) to donate the place where they were minted, as well as showing royal sovereignty over the city. These coins have been found in great numbers in the Illyrian city of Gurëzeza, and in the interior of modern-day Albania beyond the Greek colony of Apollonia.

The agreement between the city of Dyrrhachion and the Illyrian king Monounios is evolutionary because the name and symbol of the king occupied an increasing place at the expense of the city ethnic whose reminder nevertheless never disappeared. It can be assumed that the mint of Dyrrhachion minted coins both in the name of the city and in the name of the king in parallel. Monounios staters look almost indistinguishable in appearance from autonomous tridrachms of Dyrrhachion. This clearly reflects a certain monetary-issuance, but also political continuity, which Monounios seems to have cared about, at least for the first and transitional periods. The sequence of editions and the evolution of coinage symbols indicate that Monounios' name was becoming more prominent, while the city's name was finally removed. This suggests a gradual increase in Monounios' authority and awareness that he could use coins to maintain his growing power.

== Royal Tombs of Selcë e Poshtme ==
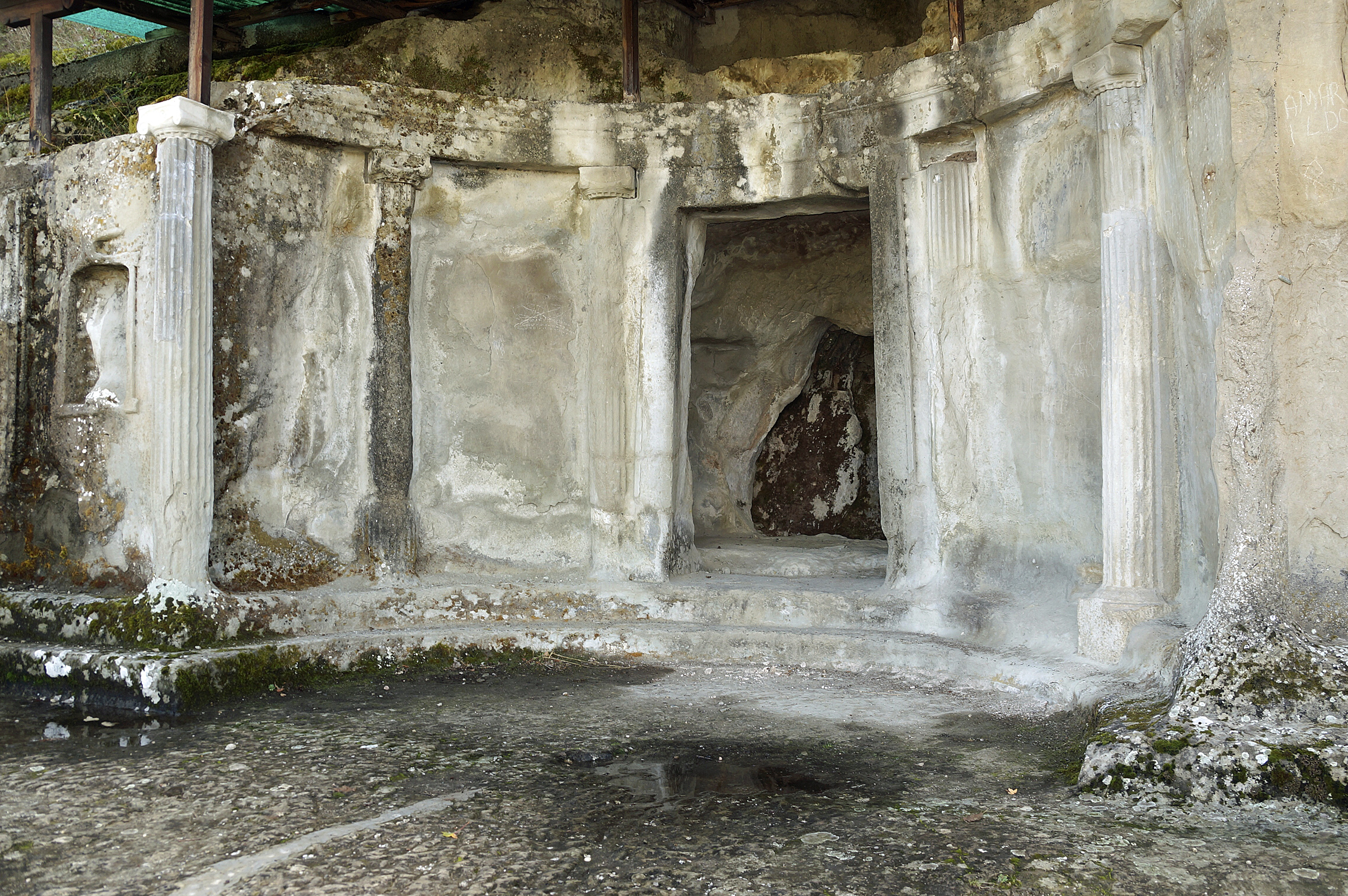
Royal tomb III, Selca e Poshtme, near the western shore of Lake Ohrid, Albania.

Monounios' second main centre might have been the site of the present day village of Selca e Poshtme in Albania, in the old residence of the Illyrian kings, which might have been also the location of the ancient city of Pelion in Dassaretia.

It is thought that the king was buried in the Royal Tombs of Selca e Poshtme. The ten burials inside the royal tombs were laden with bodies and urns accompanied by a great number of objects, belonging to a second burial period, after the royal grave was robbed in the last decades of the third century BC. Seemingly, the robbery made it impossible to tie the grave to a specific historical person. However, two reliefs decorating the sides of the grave's facade might serve to identify him. They show a shield of the Illyrian type and a helmet of the Hellenistic rulers. The former indicates a local king, while the latter is in complete conformity with a bronze helmet found in the region of Lake Ohrid during the First World War, now kept at the Antike Sammlung Museum in Berlin. On the back of the helmet in calligraphy virtually identical to that on the coins of King Monounios, the same words are written: Basileos Monouniou.

== See also ==
- List of rulers of Illyria

== Bibliography ==
- Crawford, Michael Hewson (1985). Coinage and Money under the Roman Republic: Italy and the Mediterranean Economy. The Library of Numismatics. Berkeley: University of California Press. ISBN 0-520-05506-3.
- Donnelly Carney, Elizabeth (2013). Arsinoe of Egypt and Macedon: A Royal Life. Women in Antiquity. Oxford University Press. ISBN 9780195365528.
- Džino, Danijel (2007). "The Celts in Illyricum-whoever they may be: the hybridization and construction of identities in Southeastern Europe in the fourth and third centuries BC". Opvscvla Archaeologica. 31 (1): 49–68.
- Gjongecaj, Shpresa (1998). "Le trésor de Kreshpan (Albanie)". Revue Numismatique. 6 (153): 81–102. doi:10.3406/numi.1998.2192.
- Kovač, Damir (2021). "Stateri (tridrachme) ilirskog kralja Monunija kovanih u Dirahiju" [Staters (tridrachms) of the Illyrian King Monunius coined in Dyrrachion]. Numizmatičke Vijesti (in Croatian). 74 (1): 5–13.
- Lippert, Andreas; Matzinger, Joachim (2021). Die Illyrer: Geschichte, Archäologie und Sprache. Kohlhammer Verlag. ISBN 9783170377103.
- Papazoglou, Fanoula (1965). "Les origines et la destinée de l'État illyrien: Illyrii proprie dicti". Historia: Zeitschrift für Alte Geschichte. 14 (2). Franz Steiner Verlag: 143–179. JSTOR 4434875.
- Picard, Olivier (2013). "Ilirët, kolonitë greke, monedhat dhe lufta". Iliria (in Albanian). 37: 79–97. doi:10.3406/iliri.2013.2428.
- Šašel Kos, Marjeta (2002). "Pyrrhus and Illyrian Kingdom(s?)". Greek Influence Along the East Adriatic Coast. Knjiga Mediterana. 26: 101–119. ISBN 9531631549.
- Šašel Kos, Marjeta (2003). "The Roman conquest of Dalmatia in the light of Appian's Illyrike". In Urso, Gianpaolo (ed.). Dall'Adriatico al Danubio: l'Illirico nell'età greca e romana : atti del convegno internazionale, Cividale del Friuli, 25-27 settembre 2003. I convegni della Fondazione Niccolò Canussio. ETS. pp. 141–166. ISBN 884671069X.
- Šašel Kos, Marjeta (2005). Appian and Illyricum. Narodni muzej Slovenije. ISBN 961616936X.
- Verčík, Marek; Kerschbaum, Saskia; Tušlová, Petra; Jančovič, Marián; Donev, Damjan; Ardjanliev, Pero (2019). "Settlement Organisation In The Ohrid Region". Studia Hercynia (XXIII/1): 26–54.
- Vujčić, Nemanja (2019). "The Army of Lysimachus after Corupedium". Živa Antika/Antiquité Vivante. 69 (1–2): 109–122. doi:10.47054/ZIVA19691-2109v. ISSN 0514-7727. S2CID 245589829.
- Winnifrith, Tom (2020). Nobody's Kingdom: A History of Northern Albania. Signal Books. ISBN 9781909930919.
