= Iliria (mosaic) =

Mosaic in Pogradec, Albania

Iliria is a mosaic artwork in Pogradec, Albania. It reflects the 2500-year old Illyrian history of the Lower Selce region. This work is done by artist Anastas Kostandini and decorates the front-facing center wall of the city hall.

== History and symbolism ==
Lower Selcë is a site of great archeological importance in the region of Pogradec, where royal Illyrian tombs and other artifacts, such as the ornamental metal plaque of Selce, have been uncovered. This metal ornament, dated to the 3rd century BC, depicts a battle scene which shows Illyrian warriors defeating their enemy and is interwoven with mythological elements such as dragons, griffins, fish, and birds.

Iliria uses mosaic techniques to reproduce the images and symbols from the plaque. The mosaic is a cultural and artistic representation of the Enchelei tribe, one of the largest Illyrian tribes, and their role in ancient history.

== Creation ==
Artist Anastas Kostandini has extensive experience in the creation of monumental works and has also contributed to the creation of the mosaic titled "The Albanians" in the National History Museum of Tirana. Iliri is the first work he has dedicated to his hometown of Pogradec.

For the creation of this work, Kostandini thoroughly studied the historical events of the Illyrian era, encompassing the studies conducted by Mitrush Kuteli on this period. The creation of the mosaic was done in close collaboration between Kostandini and the mayor of Pogradec, Ilir Xhakolli.

== Inauguration ==
Iliria was inaugurated on June 10, 2024. Mayor Ilir Xhakoli spoke during the ceremony, saying:

"We sought to bring forth to Pogradec this iconic piece, just as is the metal plaque of Selce, found in the royal tombs with a history dating back to the 4th century BC, and is surely a cherished symbol for Pogradec to show the ancient history it possesses."
