= Mokër =

Region in Albania

Coordinates: 40°59′N 20°31′E

Mokër is a geographical region in Southeastern Albania, composed by 47 villages, which are all above 1,000m from sea level. The region is composed of two subregions, Upper Mokër (Mokra e Sipërme) and Lower Mokër (Mokra e Poshtme). In recent years, several villages have lost much of their population due to severe economic conditions, unemployment, lack of infrastructure and emigration. One of the villages in the Mokër region is Selcë e Poshtme, which was an Illyrian settlement established in the early Iron Age. Located in the region of the Illyrian Dassaretii, it holds the Illyrian Royal Tombs which were built during the 4th and 2nd centuries BC.

== See also ==
- Selcë e Poshtme
- Royal Tombs of Selca e Poshtme

== Sources ==
- Castiglioni, Maria Paola (2010). Cadmos-serpent en Illyrie: itinéraire d'un héros civilisateur. Edizioni Plus. ISBN 9788884927422.
- Shehi, Eduard (2015). Terra sigillata en Illyrie méridionale et en Chaonie: importations et productions locales (IIe S. AV. J.-C. -IIe S. AP. J.-C.). Collecció Instrumenta (in French). Vol. 48. Barcelona: Universitat de Barcelona, Publicacions i Edicions. ISBN 978-84-475-4238-3.
- Zindel, Christian; Lippert, Andreas; Lahi, Bashkim; Kiel, Machiel (2018). Albanien: Ein Archäologie- und Kunstführer von der Steinzeit bis ins 19. Jahrhundert (in German). Vandenhoeck & Ruprecht. ISBN 9783205200109.
