= Mytilus =

Mytilus may refer to:

- Mytilus of Illyria, an ancient Illyrian king
- Mytilus (bivalve), a mollusc genus
