= National History Museum (Albania) =

Museum in Tirana, Albania

- Muzeu Historik Kombëtar

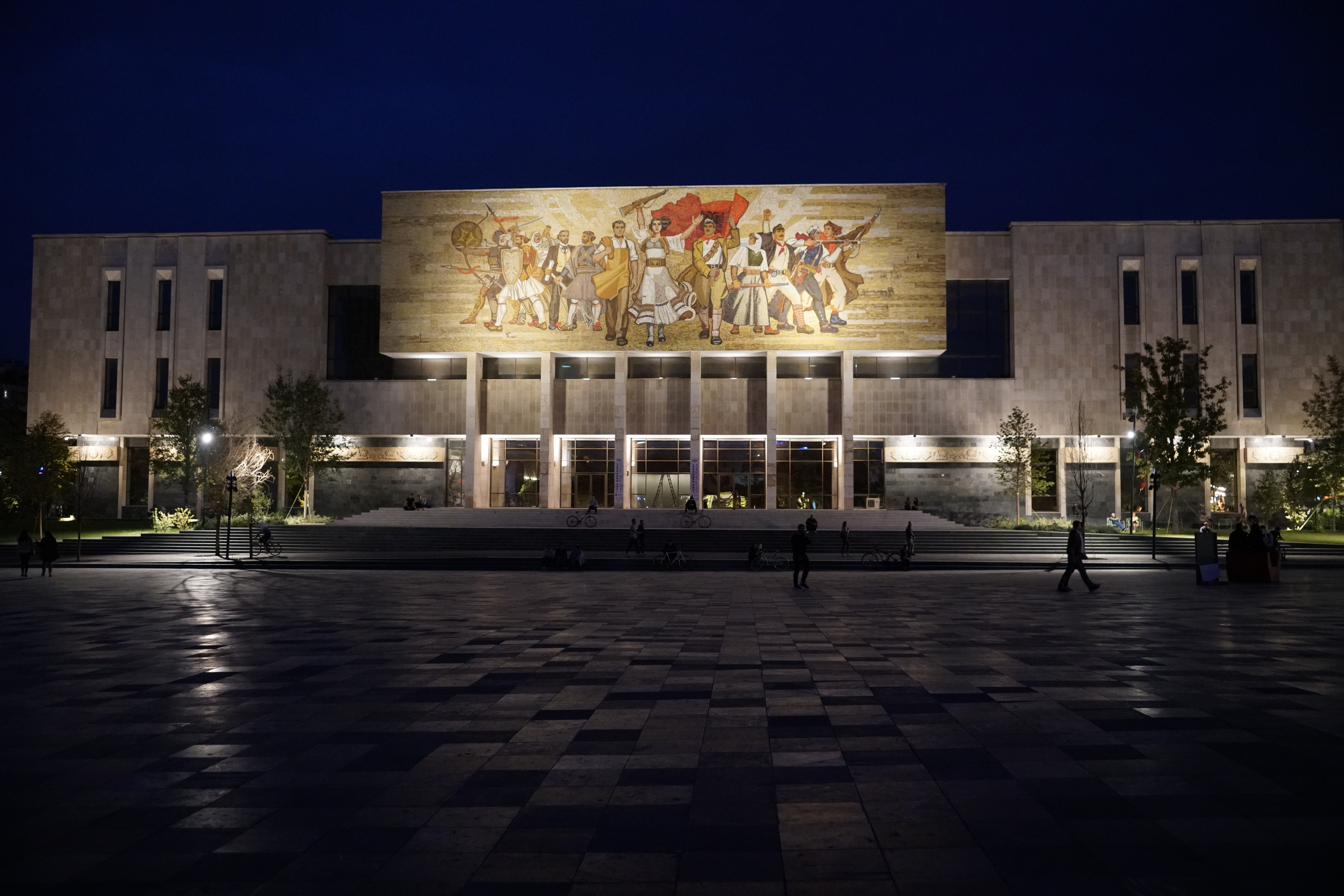
- View of the National History Museum
- Established: 28 October 1981; 44 years ago
- Location: Skanderbeg Square 7, 1001 Tirana, Albania
- Coordinates: 41°19′45″N 19°49′1″E
- Type: National Historical Museum
- Collections: 5000
- Website: www.mhk.gov.al

The National History Museum (Albanian: Muzeu Historik Kombëtar) is a historical museum in Tirana, Albania. It was opened on 28 October 1981 and is 27,000 square metres in size, while 18,000 square metres are available for expositions.

The museum includes the following pavilions: the Pavilion of Antiquity, Middle Ages, Renaissance, Independence, Iconography, National Liberation Antifascist War, Communist Terror, and Mother Teresa.

The museum is closed for renovation until 2028.

== The mural mosaic ==
Above the entrance to the museum is a large mural mosaic titled The Albanians, which depicts purported ancient to modern figures from Albania's history. The work is the result of five Albanian artists: Vilson Kilica, Anastas Kostandini, Agim Nebiu, Justin Droboniku and Aleksander Filipi. The work, completed in 1980 for the opening of the museum, is an example of Socialist realism.

The mosaic is around 11 m high, 40 m long, and covers an area of 440 m². The mosaic depicts 13 persons representing different phases of Albanian history. From left to right:

- An Illyrian warrior
- Fighters against the Ottoman Empire from the time of Skanderbeg
- Naim Frashëri
- An Albanian fighter of the Albanian National Awakening period in national costume
- A communist worker
- Mother Albania depicted as a young woman in national costume with a rifle as the central figure of the composition
- Five communist partisans of both sexes from World War II on the right as you look.

The artwork, created in 1980, was altered in the early 1990s: a large golden star above the head of the woman in the centre of the picture, and a smaller one above the twin eagle heads on the Albanian flag, were removed. The communist worker, depicted to the left of the central woman, originally carried a red book in his right hand, but this was replaced by an empty sack.

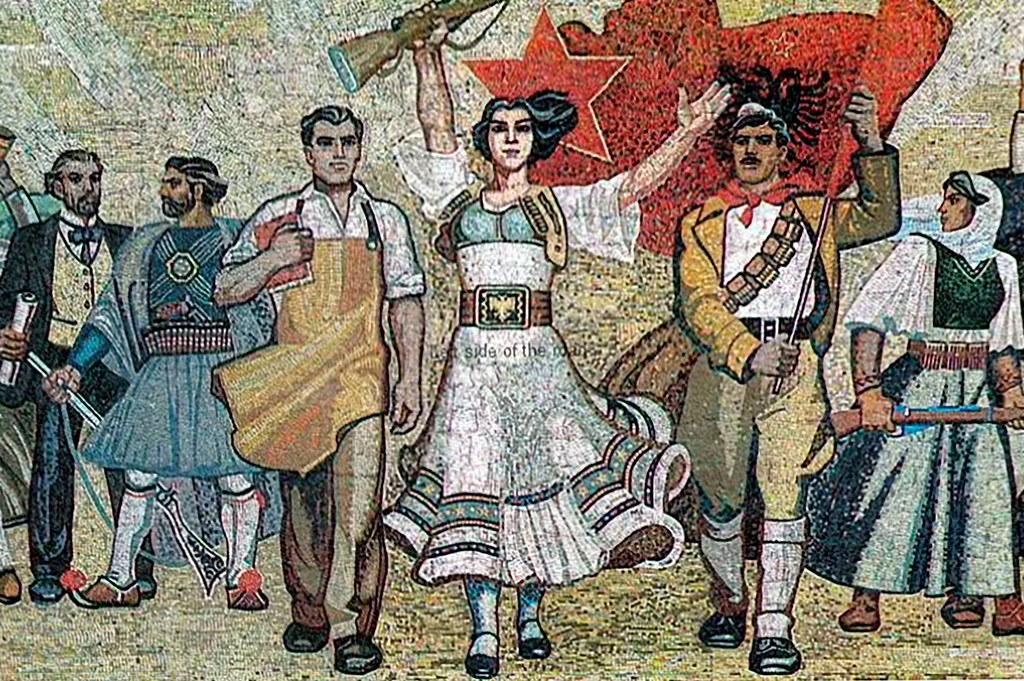
The original Mosaic as of 1980

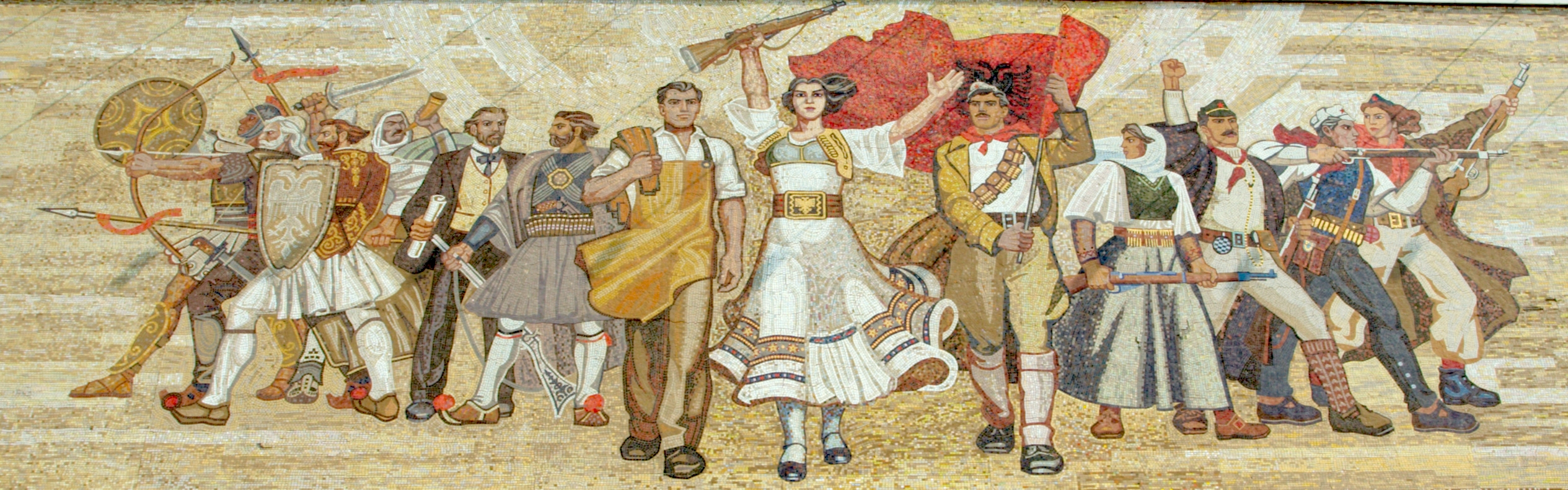
The mosaic as of the 90s

== Pavilions ==
=== Antiquity ===
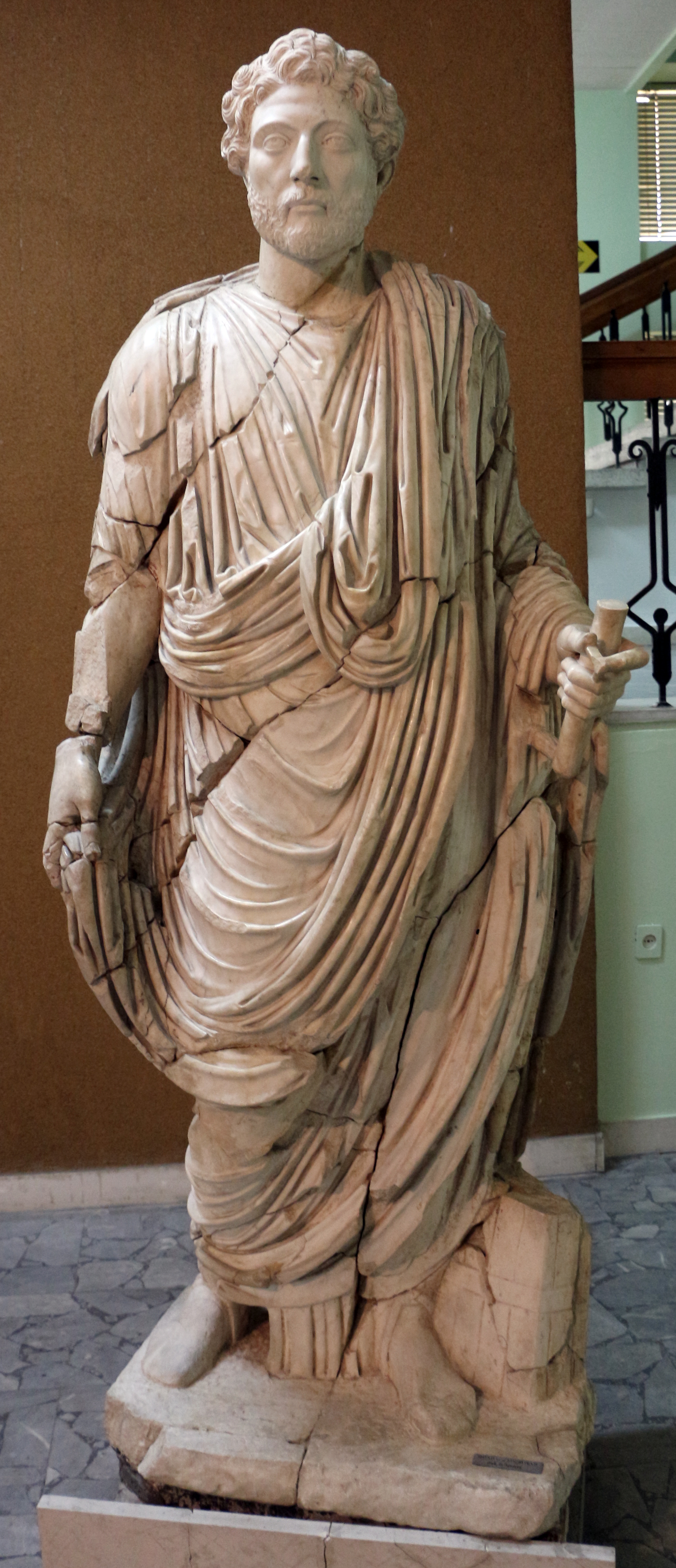
Statue of a Magistrate found in Apollonia.

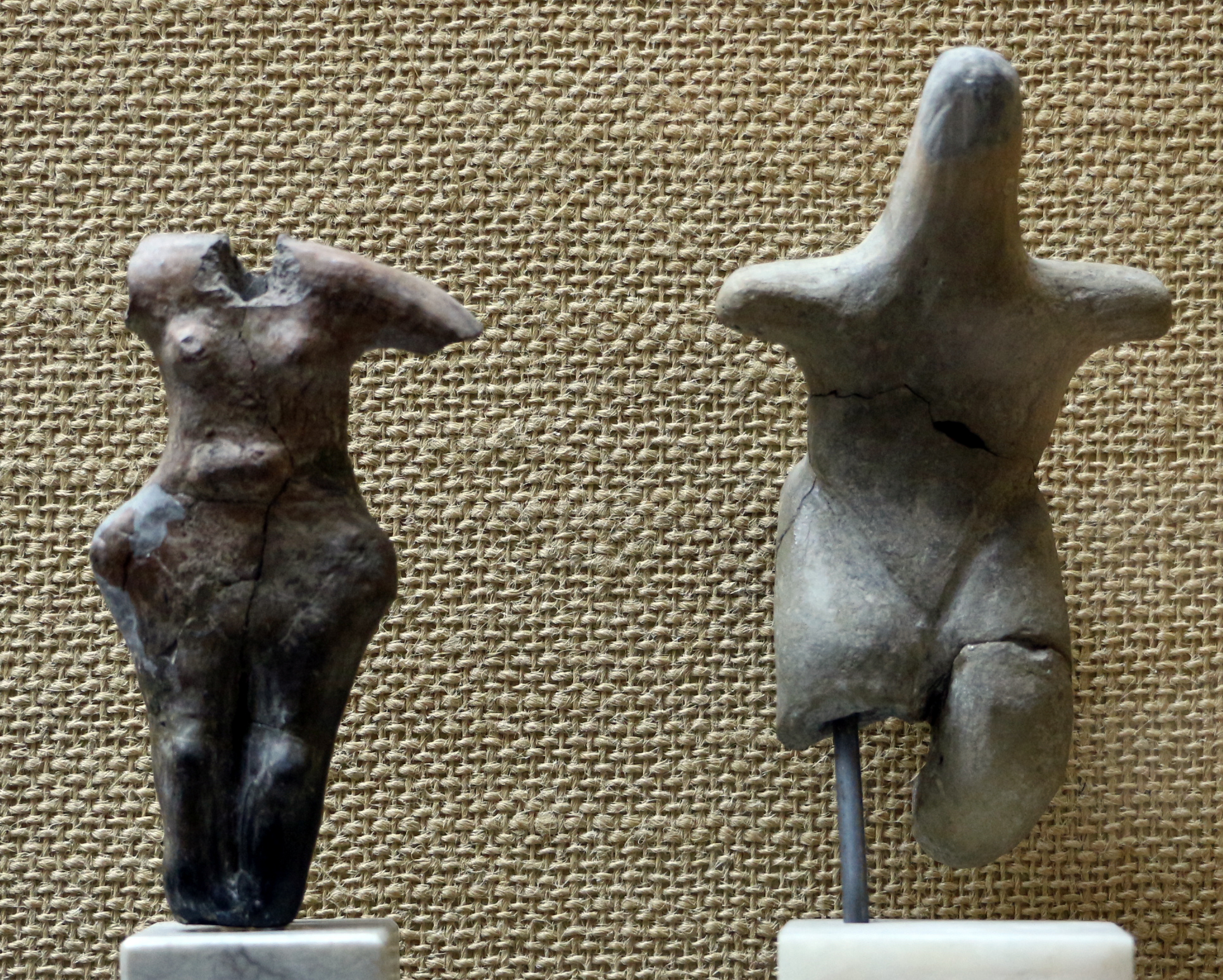
Anthropomorphic carvings from the 4th century BCE

The Pavilion of Antiquity is the most important and one of the richest with objects in the National Historical Museum, with 585 objects. The displayed objects start with the Late Paleolithic, where prehistoric culture is proved lively and powerful in our lands, and ends with objects belonging to the Early Middle Ages (4th to 8th centuries). The objects of the prehistoric settlement of Maliq represent the Neolithic flourishing since the middle of the fourth millennium until about 2600 BC.

The exhibited objects and the coins of silver and bronze embossed on behalf of the Illyrian kings of the centers of Durrës, Apollonia, Shkodër, Byllis and Amantia, discovered in the provinces of South Illyria of the 4th to 3rd centuries BC, indicate a strong economy and urban Illyrian culture in general. Impressive are sculptures of the Apolloniates school or God Apollo, one of the most beautiful sculptures of the time (6th century BC). Quite interesting are: the mosaic of The Beauty of Durrës (4th century BC), the head of Artemis (3rd century BC), the anthropomorphic appearance of river Vjosa (3rd or 2nd century BC), the head of a man of limestone (5th century AD), vases decorated with red figures, and others. The findings of Monumental Tomb of Lower Selca, Pogradec (3rd century AD) occupy an important place.

=== Middle Ages ===
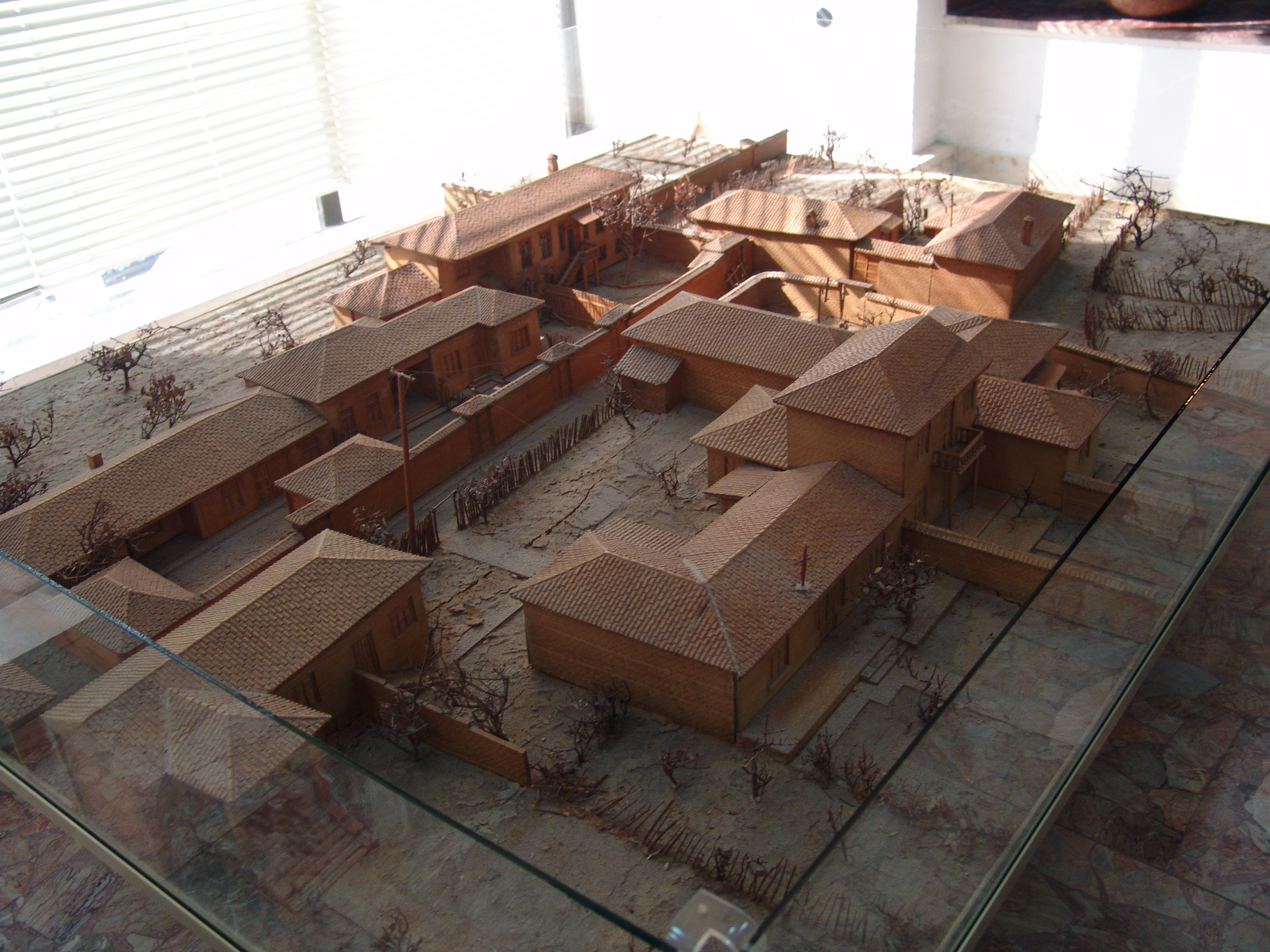
Old pattern of Albanian houses

In the Pavilion of the Middle Ages, visitors have access to the economic, social, political and cultural development of Albanians from the 6th century until the 15th. A special corner in this pavilion is dedicated to the Principality of Arber. The handover of power from Skuraj to Topiaj is expressed in the heraldic emblem of Karl Topia located in the monumental portal of the monastery of John Vladimir in Elbasan. A special object of the Pavilion of the Middle Ages is the Epitaph of Gllavenica, which dates back to the year 1373. With photos, documents and objects is given the resistance against the Ottoman occupation of Albanians, as well as key economic developments, political and social life of the country through maps, engravings of the time and quite original publications, the visitor knows Skanderbeg, who personifies the Struggle of the Albanians against the Ottoman Occupation.

=== Albanian National Renaissance ===
The Renaissance Pavilion is one of the richest with original objects, documents, books, photographs, national flags, weapons, banknotes, and other cultural objects. Most of the objects are unique to the national history and culture of the Albanians. The objects displayed in the showcases of the pavilion during the period from the mid-19th century until 1912. An object with national value is the flag of the patriotic Society "Desire" of the Albanian colony of Sofia in Bulgaria. Visitors have the opportunity to look closely the desk and the collection of books that are there, of one of the most prominent ideologists of the Albanian national ideology Sami Frasheri (1825-1904).

=== Independence ===
The Pavilion of Independence reflects the key historical moments after the Declaration of Independence in 1912 until 1939. The Declaration (Proclamation) of Independence of Albania from the National Assembly of Vlora on 28 November 1912 and subsequently the formation of the Provisional Government of Albania constitute two important acts of the Albanian national state. In the areas of this pavilion is reflected the Conference of Ambassadors in London (1912-1913). The short reign of Prince Wied in Albania in 1914 marks an important moment in the history of the establishment of the foundations of the Albanian state. The political clashes between the country's governing elite culminated in the movement of June 1924 led by Fan Noli. In the areas of this pavilion is the corner dedicated the patriotic contribution of Fan S. Noli one of the outstanding figures in the history of the Albanian nation and the state of the 20th century.

=== Albanian Iconography ===
A collection of 70 items of the Post-Byzantine art in Albania: icons, a proskynetarion, some pairs of Holy Doors and an iconostasis are on display in this pavilion. These objects belonged to different churches in Albania: Gjirokastra, Elbasani, Fieri, Berati etc., dating from the 16th century until the early 19th century. Almost all the best painters who have left impressive works in the churches of Albania, North Macedonia and Greece, such as: Onufri, Onufër Qiprioti, David Selenica, Kostandin Shpataraku, Kostandin Jeromonaku, the Zografi brothers, the Çetiri brothers, and Mihal Anagnosti are represented in this pavilion. The iconostasis (altar screen decorated with icons) comes from the church of the monastery of Saint John Vladimir in Elbasan.

=== Antifascist War ===
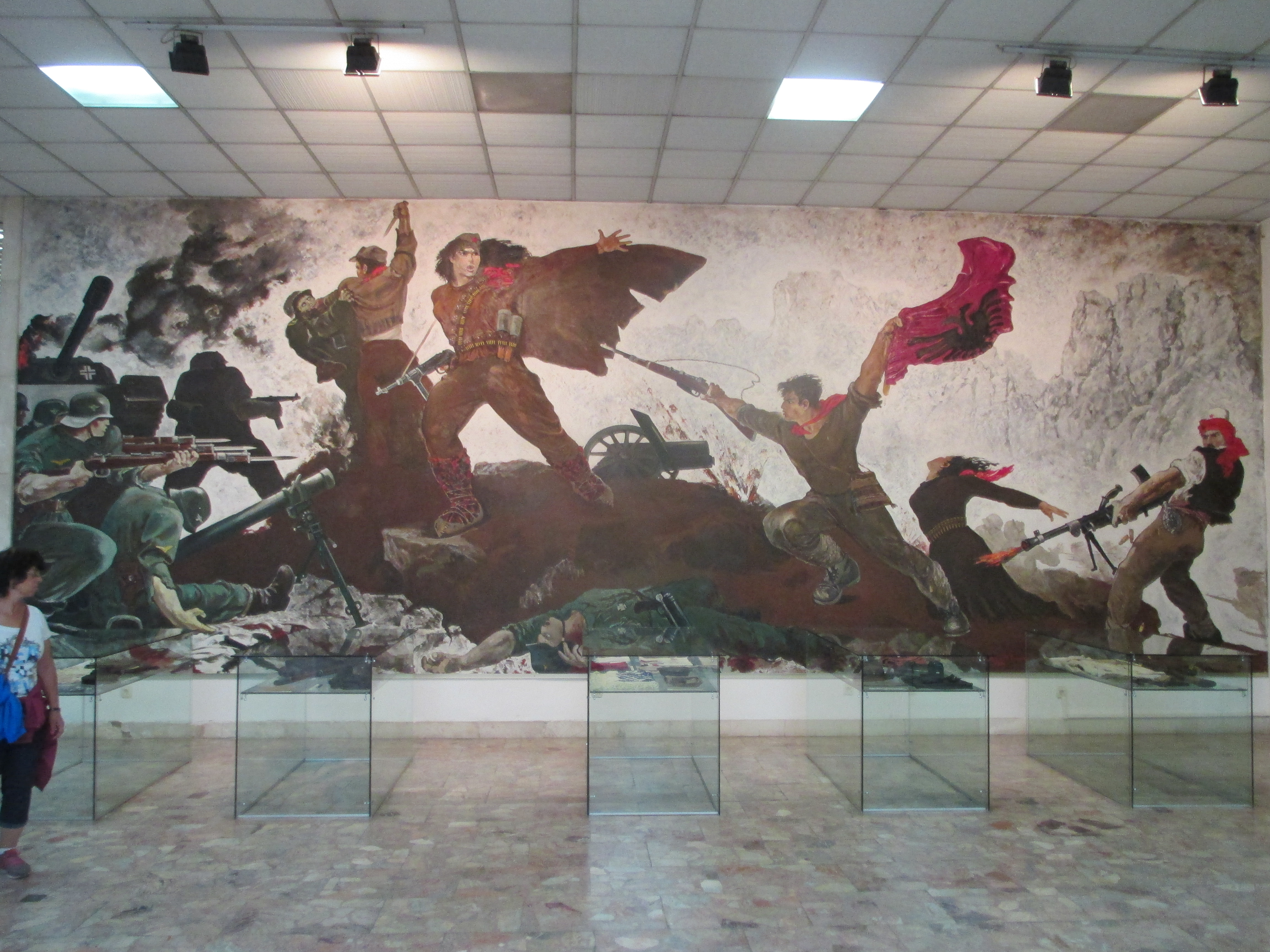
Mural painting dedicated to the Antifascist war.

This pavilion, through its 220 objects, reflects the events starting from the War of Vlora in 1920 until the end of World War II in 1945. It shows the reaction of several Albanian intellectuals in the 1920s and 30s against the rise to power in Italy of fascism. Chronologically, the pavilion displays the ensuing events related to the installation of the fascist regime in Albania on 7 April 1939 and the beginning of organized antifascist resistance. The Albanian volunteers who took part in the War of Spain have their place in this pavilion too. There are also many relics from national martyrs and heroes who gave their lives in the war against Fascism and Nazism. Particular emphasis has been given to the contribution of the powerful (British, Soviet, and American) allies and their missions in Albania. In this pavilion, there are also documents which reflect the support, sheltering, and protection of the Jewish population during the Holocaust in Albania, an expression of the deep humanism of the Albanian people.

=== Communist Terror ===
The Pavilion of the Communist Terror was inaugurated in 2012. In this pavilion are displayed documents, photographs and objects, which belong to the period of one-party system in Albania from 1945 to 1990. The historical content of this pavilion is further enriched by film images, provided by the Central Film Archives. An important part of the Pavilion are the documentary and photographic materials which reflect the cleansing operations against the anticommunist forces, a special court against the political opponents during the war as well as the liquidation of the anti-communist opposition. In the showcases are displayed relics which belonged to numerous persons convicted or executed by the regime of that time.

=== Mother Teresa ===
This pavilion is dedicated to Mother Teresa’s family, life and work. The visitors are acquainted with her charitable work for which she has been assigned with many international awards. In the stands of the pavilion there are photos of global personalities who met Mother Teresa as Jacques Chirac, Bill Clinton, Tony Blair, Ibrahim Kodra etc.

== See also ==
- Culture of Tirana
- History of Albania
- Landmarks in Tirana
