= The Beauty of Durrës =

Mosaic discovered in Albania

- Bukuroshja e Durrësit (Albanian)
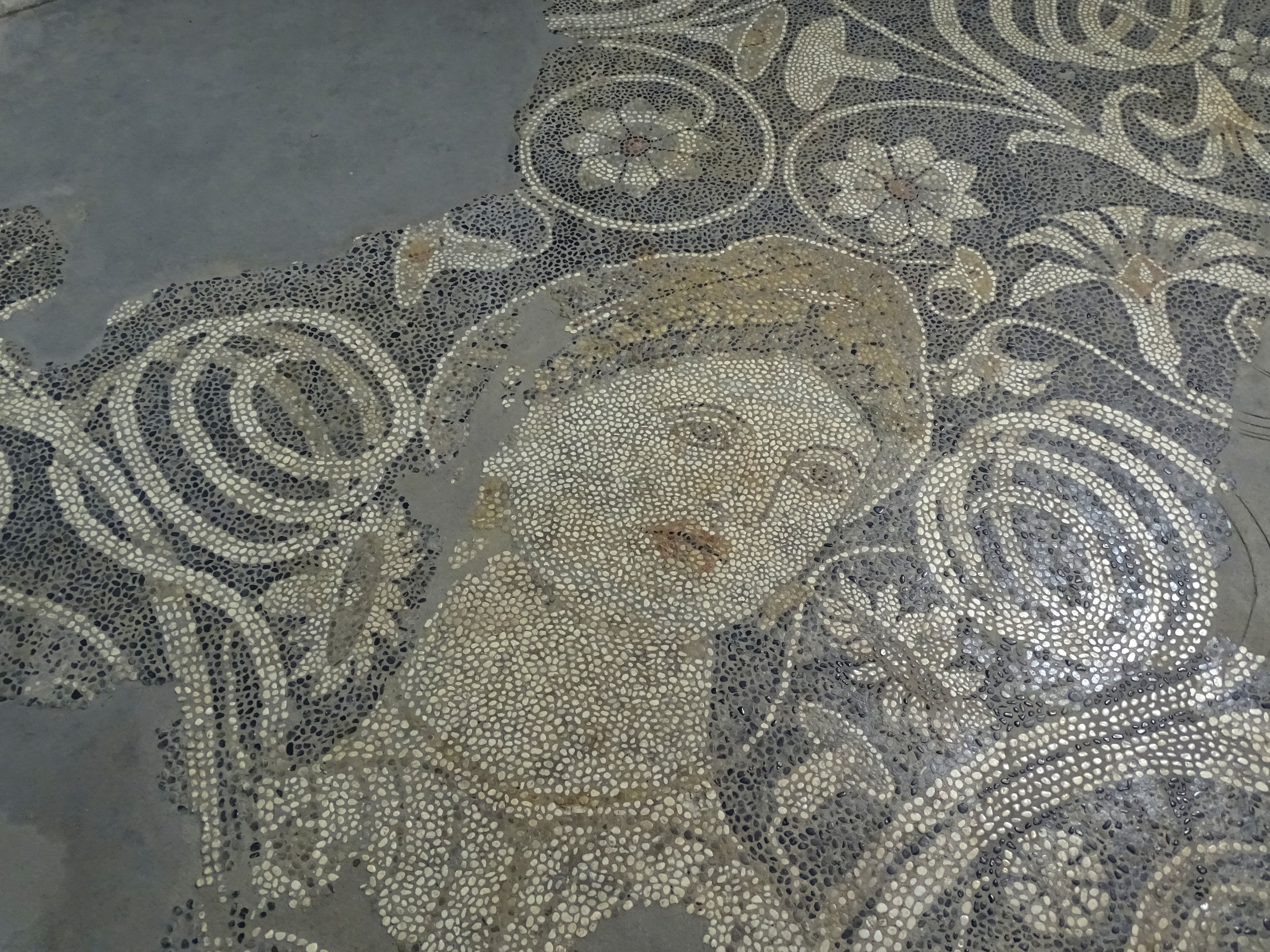
- Year: 4th century BC
- Type: mosaic
- Dimensions: 510 cm × 300 cm (200 in × 120 in)
- Location: National Historical Museum; Tirana, Albania

The Beauty of Durrës (also called The Beautiful Maiden of Durrës or The Belle of Durrës) is a polychromatic mosaic of the 4th century BC and is the most ancient and important mosaic discovered in Albania. The 9 m^{2} (97 sq ft) mosaic is elliptical in shape and depicts a woman’s head on a black background, surrounded by flowers and other floral elements. It was discovered in 1918 in Durrës, and since 1982 has been on display at the National Historical Museum of Albania in Tirana.

== History ==
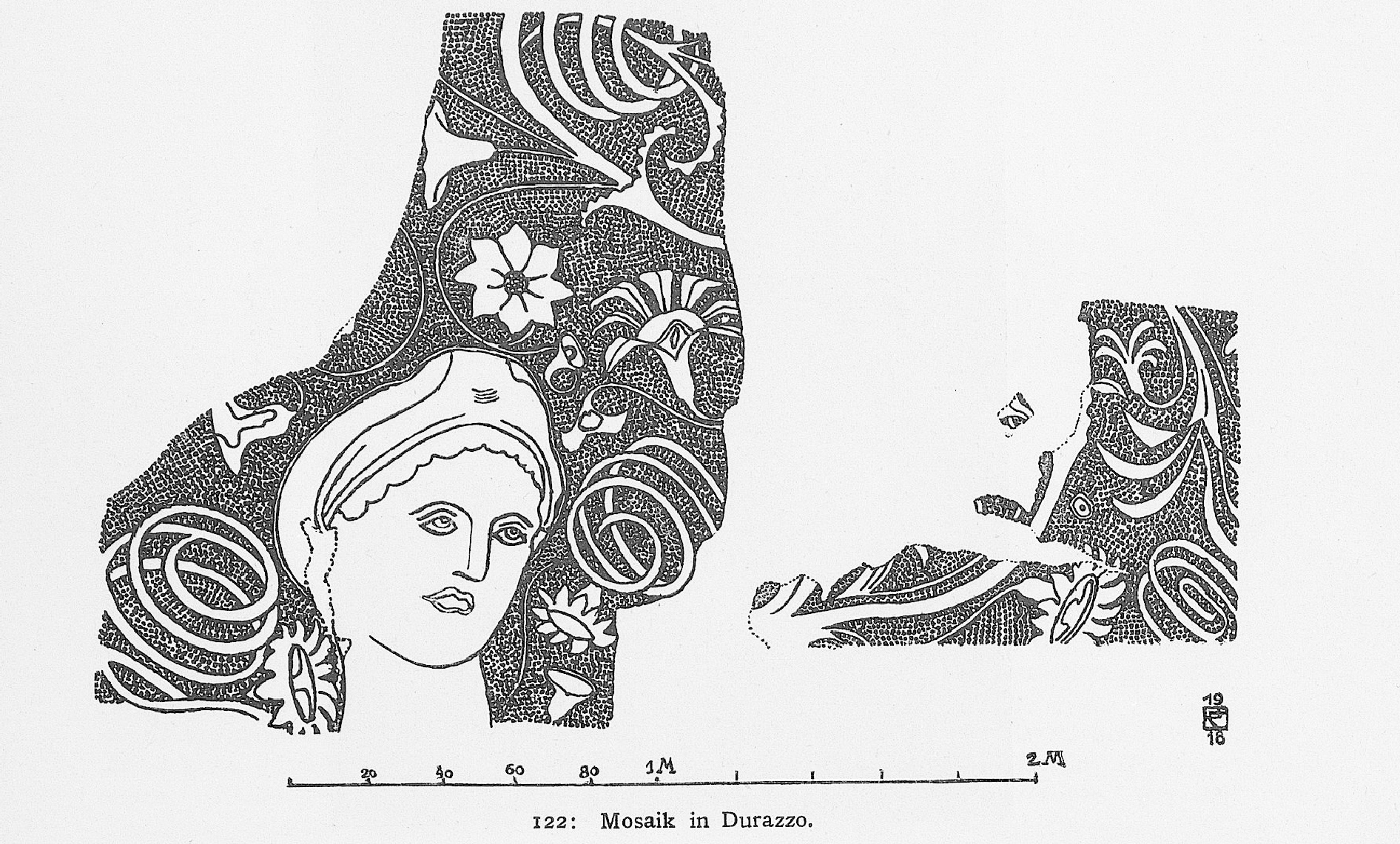
Sketch by Camillo Praschniker, 1918

The mosaic was created in the second half of 4th century BC in Durrës, then known as Epidamnos, to serve as the decorative floor of a private and luxurious restroom. The mosaic was discovered in 1916, in the middle of the First World War, when Durrës was occupied by the forces of Austria-Hungary. During works by the Austro-Hungarian army to construct air raid shelters, the military engineers ran into this mosaic, which was unearthed 3.80 m (12.5 ft) deep in the foundations of a house in the “Varosh” quarter, very close to the present-day city centre of Durrës city. The Austrian archaeologist Camillo Praschniker quickly examined the mosaic in April 1918 before the shelter was finished. In his article Muzakhia and Malakastra: Archaeological research in Central Albania (German: Muzakhia und Malakastra: archäologische Untersuchungen in Mittelalbanien), published in Vienna in 1920, Praschniker was the first to include a picture of the mosaic and he described it as a figurative masterpiece.

Eventually, after the end of the war, The Beauty of Durrës was covered up and lost to view, only to be rediscovered in 1947 by an archaeologist from Durrës, Vangjel Toçi. It became widely known to the world of art history only after 1959.

In 1982 the mosaic was carefully moved from Durrës and placed in the main hall of antiquities in the National Historical Museum at Tirana, where it can still be seen today.

== Mosaic description ==
Some 24 centuries old, the mosaic known as The Beauty of Durrës has a surface area of about nine square metres. It is elliptical in shape, some 5.1 metres (17 ft) across at the widest and some 3 metres (9.8 ft) at the narrowest. The mosaic is made of unworked coloured pebbles and is still in fairly good condition. The formal expression represents a good example of the art of antiquity, in which Hellenistic art is combined with the local motifs of Illyrian art. It is considered one of the world's most expressive mosaics of its genre. From a stylistical point of view, the mosaic resembles mosaics of the same period discovered in Pella, once part of Ancient Macedonia.

=== The woman portrait ===
There are at least two theories about the subject portrayed in the mosaic. According to the historian and archaeologist Moikom Zeqo, the woman represented in the mosaic is the same as one painted on archetypes of amphorae in Apulia and other parts of Southern Italy, with red figures of the Hellenistic era. According to him, the Beauty of Durrës represents the Cretan goddess Eileithyia, who was goddess of childbirth and midwifery, assisting in the healthy delivery of infants. However, the archaeologist Afrim Hoti suggests that the portrait of the woman is probably the maiden Aura, a companion of the goddess Artemis in hunting.

The woman’s head is large in scale, with a broad face and wide cheeks. She has a long straight neck, and her head is slightly turned to the left side, creating a three-quarters portrait. Her image appears quiet and peaceful and her look is dreamy, almost melancholic. The figure is depicted with glossy red curved lips. The painstakingly elaborated plasticity of the lips, the lusciousness of their form and their slightly open position, gives her an exceptionally feminine physiognomy. A single small yellow and red pebble in the pupil of her eye creates a genuinely rare look on the woman's figure. Her braided crown of auburn hair is particularly well depicted and quite distinguished from the black background through the usage of a white silhouette. The plastic effect of the mosaic’s female figure in its whole integrity, represents a work of highly developed artistic craftsmanship for the time.

=== Background design ===
The design surrounding the female figure is unique concerning its composition and the mosaic background is black in colour. It is characterized by a strong lyricism of forms, evident in the continuity of the curvaceous lines, spontaneously harmonic design, and the fluid distribution of the elements. The female figure is surrounded by flowers of several kinds, such as hyacinth, lily, and bellflower, as well as other floral elements such as stalks, buds, and petals.

=== Technique ===
The Mosaic was made using the opus vermiculatum technique, thus a light outline is drawn around the shapes using tesserae, which is contrasted by the dark black background. The river pebbles of different colors are stuck with each other with a great mastery. The plastic effect of the portrait is achieved by using several nuances of white pebbles, positioned in the model with an exceptional skill. Whereas the black lines are used only for modelling the portrait's main features.

== The mosaic figure as part of culture and modern society ==
Book cover of "4 shekuj para Krishtit", by the poet Ferik Ferra, depicting The Beauty of Durrës

The Beauty of Durrës represents a symbol of beauty and it has become an iconic figure which is adopted in several forms of visual art, poetry, popular culture and commercial life especially in Durrës, the city of its origin. Examples of modern utilizations of the Beauty of Durrës are:

- In the poetry book "4 shekuj para Krishtit" (English: 4 centuries before Christ) of the Albanian contemporary poet Ferik Ferra, the main poem of the same title deals artistically with the feminine figure of the mosaic and its era, while antiquity is the main subject of the other poems and the book title is an allusion to the time the mosaic was realized.
- In the International SummerFest Film of Durrës, the best short film award is named “The Beauty of Durrës” or “The Beautiful Maiden of Durrës Award”.
- Association Bukuroshja e Durrësit in cooperation with the Ministry of Tourism, Cultural Affairs, Youth and Sports (Albania) organizes the International Festival of Modern Dance, held from 2006 both in Durrës and Tirana.
- The Albanian artist of marble, Isa Shuaipi realized an artistic imitation of The Beauty of Durrës in June 2009. His work was done by using more than 45 thousand small marble pebbles of five different colors on a quadratic plane with dimensions 120 cm (47 in) by 80 cm (31 in).
- The scenography of the 30th edition of Festivali i Këngës (English: Song’s Festival) in 1991, consisted mainly on an imitation in a larger scale of The Beauty of Durrës, though it differed somehow from the original mosaic.
- In the commercial sector, one of the two restaurants of the five star Adriatik hotel in Durrës bears the name of the mosaic Bukuroshja e Durrësit.

=== Coin depicting the Beauty of Durrës ===
In 2004, the Bank of Albania issued a coin celebrating Albanian antiquity, depicting the Beauty of Durrës and decorative elements from it on both the obverse and the reverse. This is a serrated white-metal coin with a face value of 50 Lekë, 24.25 millimetres (0.955 in) in diameter and weighing 5.50 grams, and some 200,000 of the coins were issued, made of an alloy of 75 parts of copper to 25 of nickel.

The coin’s obverse shows the Beauty of Durrës mosaic, surrounded by arches and stylized floral motives from the mosaic. In the arch of the coin there are several decorative motifs, such as symmetrical circles of the Illyrian period. The reverse of the coin bears a decorative creation on its center, surrounded by floral motifs taken from the mosaic. This figure is still accompanied by circles up to the coin arch, below which there is the inscription "SHQIPËRI-ALBANIA 2004".

The Albanian painter and engraver Petraq Papa made the punches from which the coin was minted, and this was done by the Polish Mint (Mennica Państwowa SA) in Warsaw, Poland.

== See also ==
- Durrës
- Albania
- Epidamnos
- History of Albania
- Tourism in Albania
- Architecture of Albania
- University of Dyrrhachium
