= Mytilos =

Illyrian king

- King
- Reign: c. 270 – 231 BC
- Predecessor: Monunios
- Father: Monunios (probable)

Mytilos or Mytilus (Ancient Greek: Μύτιλος; Latin: Mytilus; ruled c. 270 – 231 BC) was an Illyrian king who reigned in southern Illyria, around the hinterland of Dyrrhachion and Apollonia. He was the successor of Monunios, and probably his son. Mytilus is mentioned by Pompeius Trogus (1st century BC) and Frontinus (1st century AD) reporting the events of the military conflict between the Illyrians and the Epirotes under Alexander II, son of Pyrrhus. From around 270 BC Mytilus minted in Dyrrhachion his own bronze coins bearing the king's name and the symbol of the city.

== Biography ==
Mytilus reigned in the hinterland of Dyrrachion and Apollonia. Mytilus minted his own bronze coins dating back to around 270 BC, with the symbols of Dyrrhachion and the king's name. The fact that his coins were struck in the city mint of Dyrrhachion stresses that he exercised to some extent his authority over the city, as had done his predecessor Monunios. After Monunios, Mytilus is the second Illyrian king to have struck coins bearing his name. Coinage of Apollonia from the same period bore only his monogram, as well as symbols similar to those of the Aetolian League, an adversary of Epirus. Copies of the Illyrian coins are kept at the Archaeological Museum in Zagreb, Croatia. The bronze coins had the head of Hercules on the obverse and on the reverse, Heracles' symbols: quiver, bow and mace with the words ΒΑΣΙΛΕΩΣ ΜΥΤΙΛ.

The Illyrian king Mytilus also appears in the historical accounts of ancient writers Pompeius Trogus (1st century BC) and Frontinus (1st century AD), which describe the war he waged around 270 BC against the successor of Pyrrhus, Alexander II of Epirus. Mytilus, presumably, retained his authority in Durrës after Alexander II invaded his territory in or around 270 BC. On one occasion, some Epirotes were dressed in Illyrian clothes and were put them to plunder their own sites. Unsuspecting, the Illyrians relaxed their defences and rushed to emulate them, believing that men in front of them were just their own probes. So they were easy victims of Epirus. The control of Durrës and Apollonia means that at the time of Mytilus, the Illyrians had regained the extent and authority it enjoyed in the time of Glaucias. Mytilus had even taken an excursion into the territory of Epirus. It is during this time that Rome was first invited to intervene against the Illyrians, Epirotes and the Aetolians in the Balkans.

== See also ==
- List of rulers of Illyria
- Illyrian coinage

== Bibliography ==
- Crawford, Michael Hewson (1985). Coinage and Money under the Roman Republic: Italy and the Mediterranean Economy. The Library of Numismatics. Berkeley: University of California Press. ISBN 0-520-05506-3.
- Dzino, Danijel (2010). Illyricum in Roman Politics, 229 BC–AD 68. Cambridge University Press. ISBN 978-0-521-19419-8.
- Mesihović, Salmedin; Šačić, Amra (2015). Historija Ilira [History of Illyrians] (in Bosnian). Sarajevo: Univerzitet u Sarajevu [University of Sarajevo]. ISBN 978-9958-600-65-4.
- Šašel Kos, Marjeta (2002). "Pyrrhus and Illyrian Kingdom(s?)". Greek Influence Along the East Adriatic Coast. Knjiga Mediterana. 26: 101–119. ISBN 9531631549.
- Šašel Kos, Marjeta (2005). Appian and Illyricum. Narodni muzej Slovenije. ISBN 961616936X.
- Wilkes, John (1992). The Illyrians. Wiley-Blackwell. ISBN 0-631-19807-5.
- Winnifrith, Tom (2020). Nobody's Kingdom: A History of Northern Albania. Signal Books. ISBN 9781909930919.
