= Selcë e Poshtme =

- Village
- Location within Albania
- Coordinates: 40°59′N 20°31′E
- Country: Albania
- County: Korçë
- Municipality: Pogradec
- Administrative unit: Proptisht
- Time zone: UTC+1 (CET)
  - Summer (DST): UTC+2 (CEST)

Selcë e Poshtme ("Lower Selcë") is a village located in the Mokra area, Korçë County, Albania. At the 2015 local government reform it became part of the municipality Pogradec. Near the village, on the right bank of Shkumbin river at an elevation of 1,040 metres (3,410 ft) above sea level, 5 Illyrian Royal Tombs of Selca e Poshtme are found. In 1996, Albania included the Royal Tombs of Lower Selcë in the UNESCO World heritage list of proposals.

== History ==
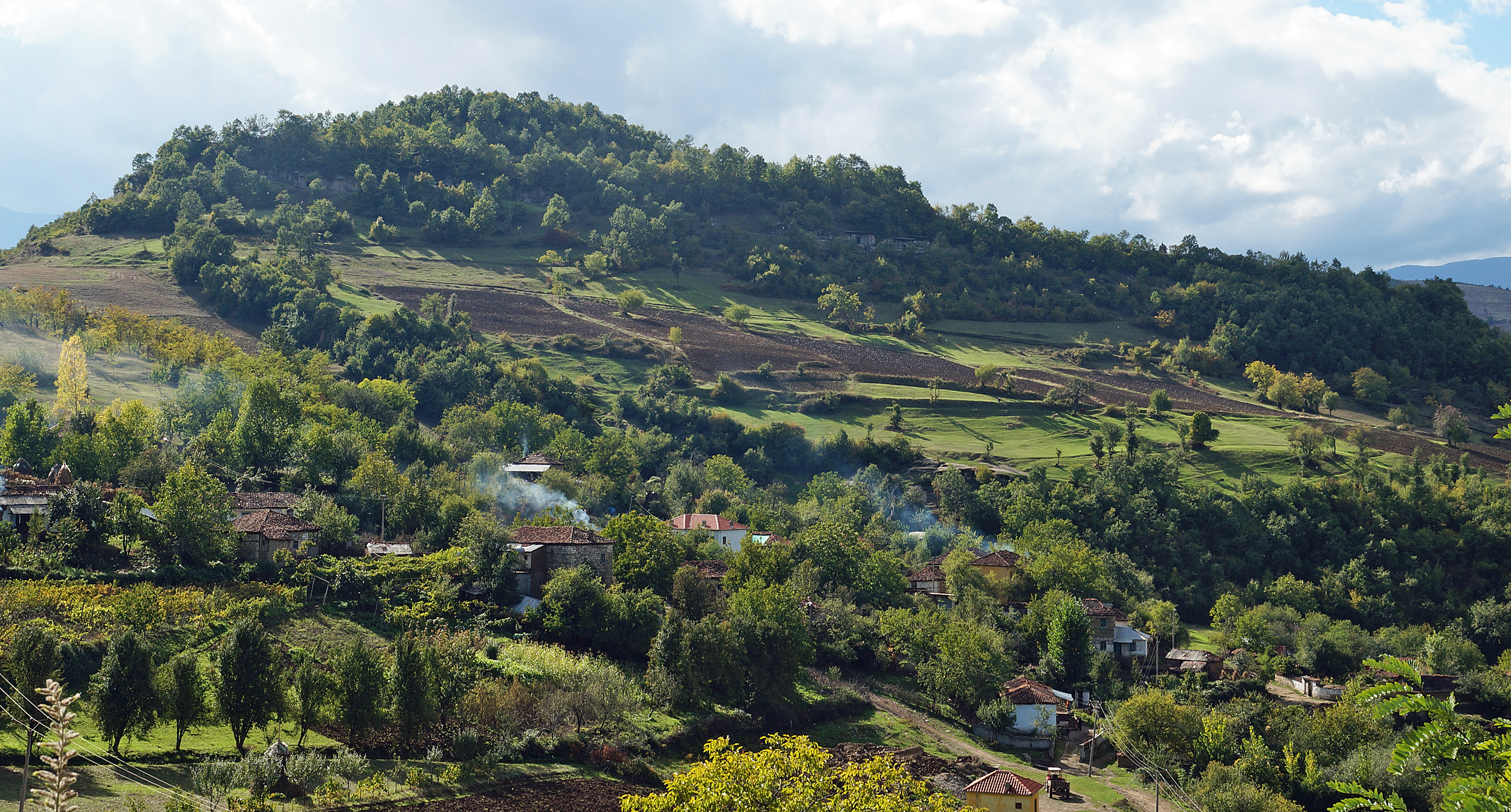
Hill settlement at Selcë e Poshtme.

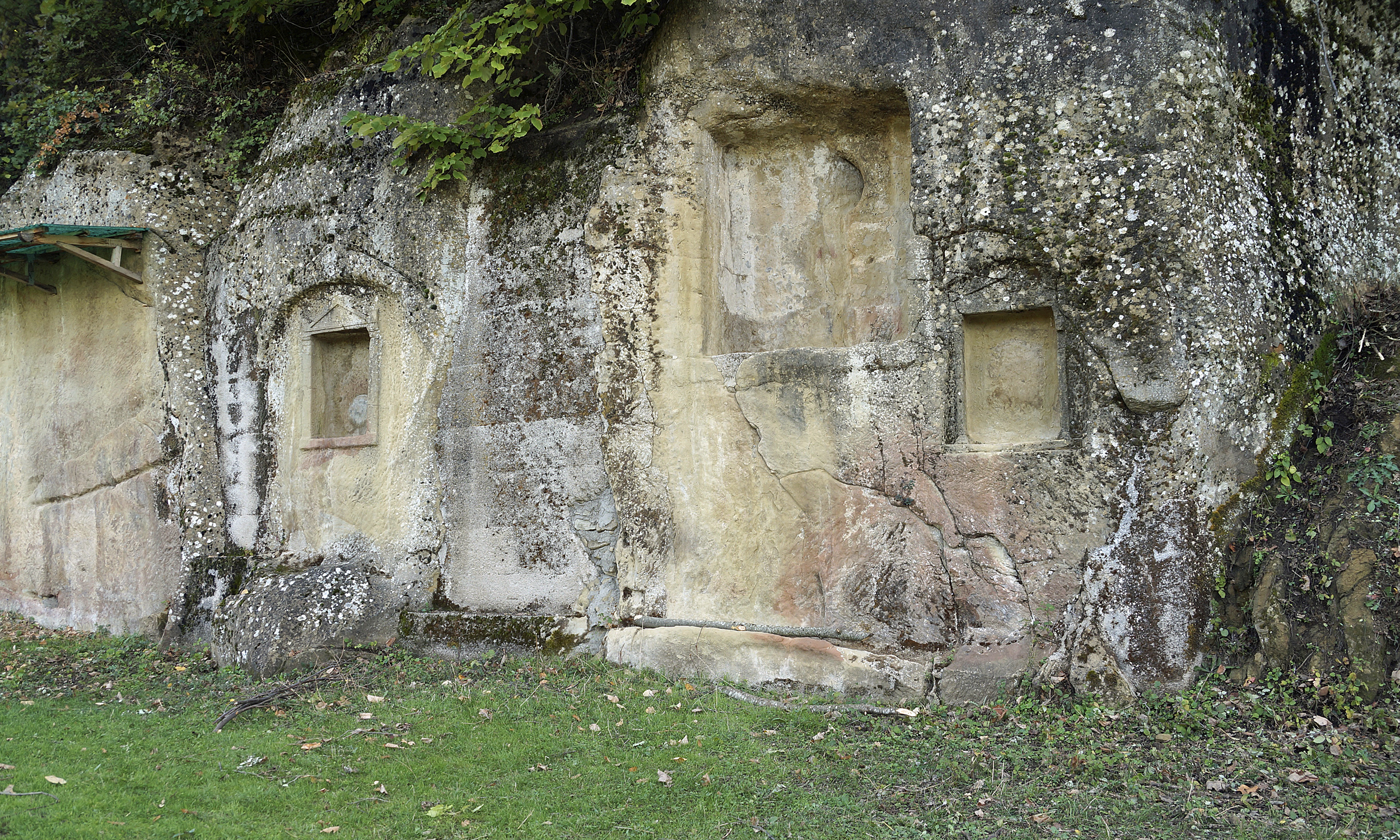
Part of the facade of Royal Tomb IV at Selca e Poshtme.

At Selcë e Poshtme an Illyrian settlement was established since the early Iron Age. At the beginning of the 4th century BC the first pre-urban phase evolved into a second urban phase that lasted until the 1st century AD. It was located in the region of the Illyrian Dassaretii. The Illyrian Royal Tombs were built on this site during the 4th and 2nd centuries BC.

The third and last phase of the site was less developed than the two previous phases. Archaeological remains of the first three centuries of the Common Era are the least representative of the site. The settlement continued being inhabited during the Roman Imperial period under Anastasius I and Justinian. The third phase lasted until the settlement was abandoned in late antiquity between the 4th and 6th centuries CE.

The site of Selcë was in antiquity a flourishing economical centre more developed than the surroundings because it occupied a predominant position inside the region currently called Mokër, and because it controlled the road which led from the Adriatic coasts of Illyria to Macedonia.

Lower Selcë is a suggested location of the historic site of Pellion, where in 335 BC Alexander the Great advanced his forces to attack the Illyrians under Cleitus, son of Bardylis and Glaukias of the Taulantii, following the death of Philip II, thus securing Macedonia's northern border before leaving to conquer Asia. However alternative locations for Pelion have been proposed, including Zvezde near Korça or in Goricë. In the area of modern Pogradec, Illyrians seems to have been influenced by the styles of the Macedonians.

== Sources ==
- Castiglioni, Maria Paola (2010). Cadmos-serpent en Illyrie: itinéraire d'un héros civilisateur. Edizioni Plus. ISBN 9788884927422.
- Shehi, Eduard (2015). Terra sigillata en Illyrie méridionale et en Chaonie: importations et productions locales (IIe S. AV. J.-C. -IIe S. AP. J.-C.). Col·lecció Instrumenta (in French). Vol. 48. Barcelona: Universitat de Barcelona, Publicacions i Edicions. ISBN 978-84-475-4238-3.
- Wilkes, John J. (1992). The Illyrians. Oxford, United Kingdom: Blackwell Publishing. ISBN 0-631-19807-5.
- Zindel, Christian; Lippert, Andreas; Lahi, Bashkim; Kiel, Machiel (2018). Albanien: Ein Archäologie- und Kunstführer von der Steinzeit bis ins 19. Jahrhundert (in German). Vandenhoeck & Ruprecht. ISBN 9783205200109.
