= Royal Tombs of Selca e Poshtme =

Ancient Illyrian tombs near Pogradec, Albania

Coordinates: 40°59′28″N 20°31′09″E

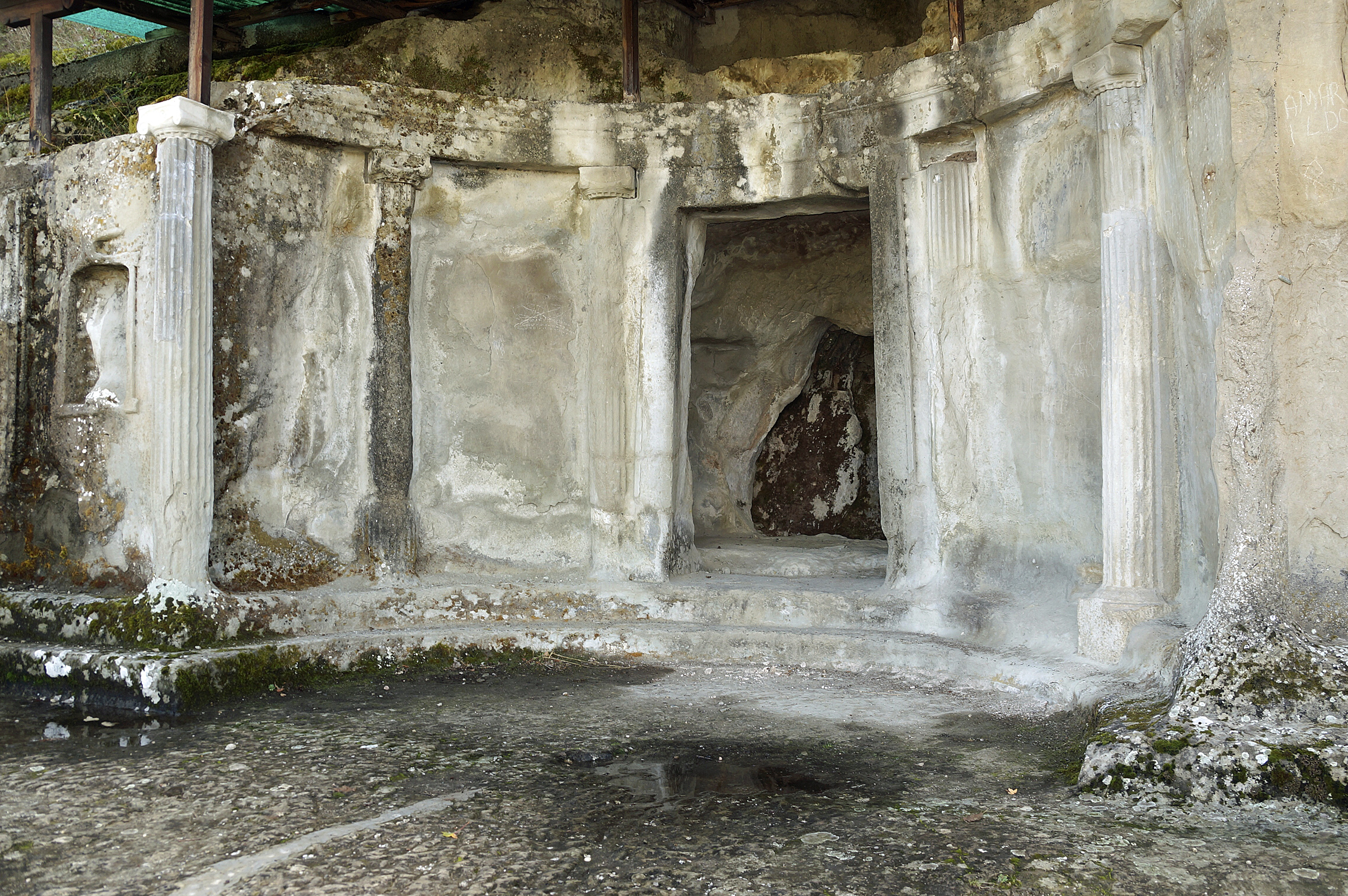
Tomb III

The Illyrian Tombs of Selca e Poshtme (Albanian: Varret e Selcës së Poshtme) are located near the town of Pogradec in Albania near the village of Selcë e Poshtme. On the right bank of the river Shkumbin at an elevation of 1040 m above sea level, lie the remains of the ancient city of Pelion and the accompanying necropolis. The Roman Via Egnatia led past it towards Thessaloniki. Though there are traces of human activity in Neolithic times, the settlement proper dates to the Iron Age (Illyrian proto-urban) through to the Illyrian urban period (5th to 2nd centuries BC), and reached its height under settlement by the Illyrian tribe of Enchele in the later Iron Age and was also occupied in the Roman period as traces of a municipal building show. From the 4th to 1st centuries BC the city was the royal residence of Illyrian kings and therefore, also probably an important political and economic centre. In 1996, Albania included the Royal tombs of Selca e Poshtme in the UNESCO World heritage list of proposals.

== The settlement ==
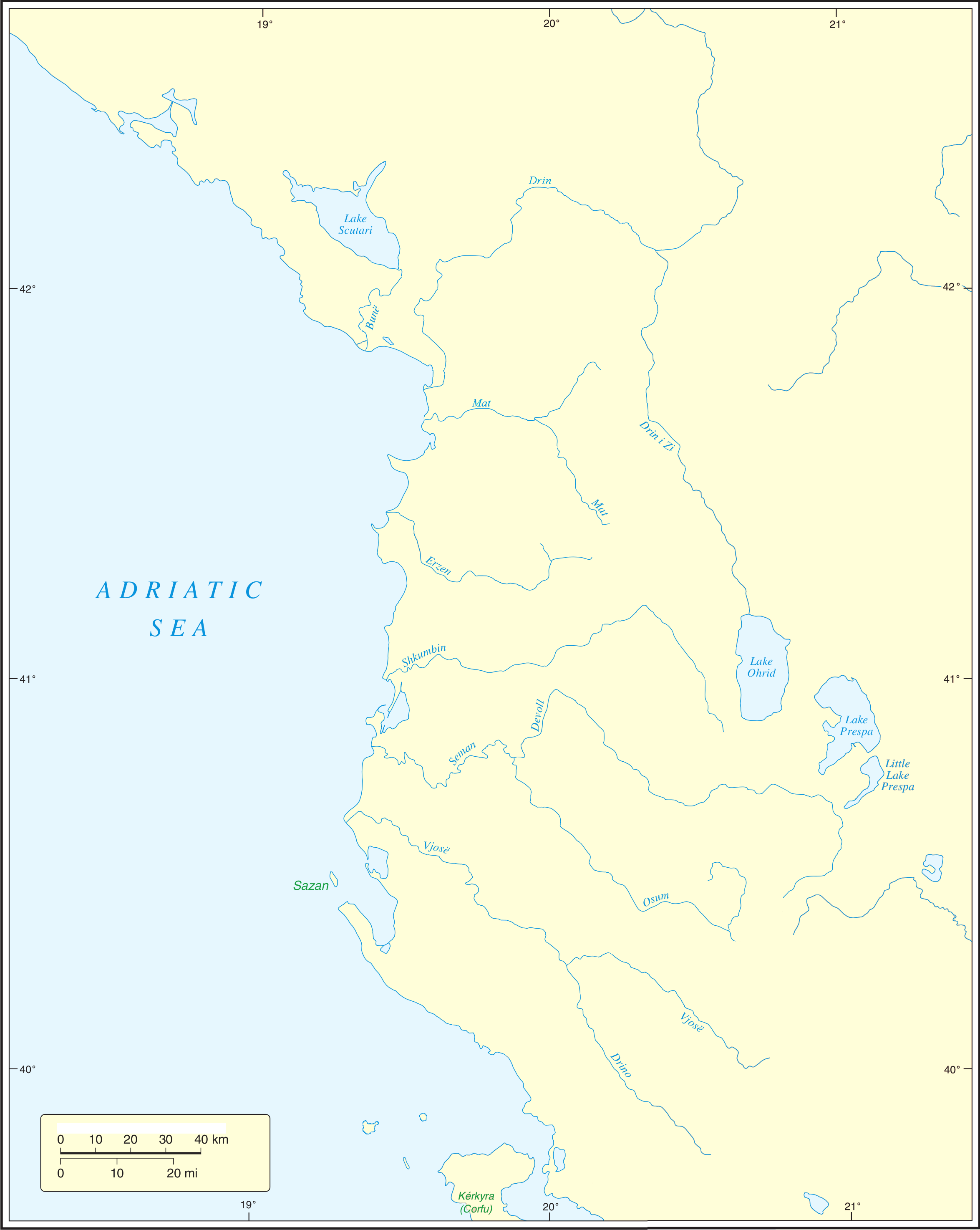

From 1969 to 1972 excavations were conducted by the Albanian archaeologist Neritan Ceka. According to Ceka, the settlement has five phases of occupation. Selcë I to III are divided into: late Neolithic, early Bronze Age and Late Bronze Age, all represented by different ceramic forms. The settlement was continuously inhabited from the Bronze Age into the Iron Age. During the 6th to 5th centuries BC the settlement developed as a proto-urban center on the road that ran along the river Shkumbin connecting the coast of Albania to Macedonia. From the Iron Age there is a permanent settlement at the site. Around 570 BC/550 BC we arrive at the phase of Selcë IV, evidenced by traces of burnt dwellings, pottery, including imports from Corinth in the lower horizon, and some Ionian wares. In the upper horizon, local, red-brown painted pottery, wheel made pottery with two handles and Ionic and Attic products were found. The local potters copied Greek models and were also influenced by their style. During the 4th century the acropolis was fortified by an encircling wall of well-cut stone. The city occupied an area of 30,000 m^{2}.

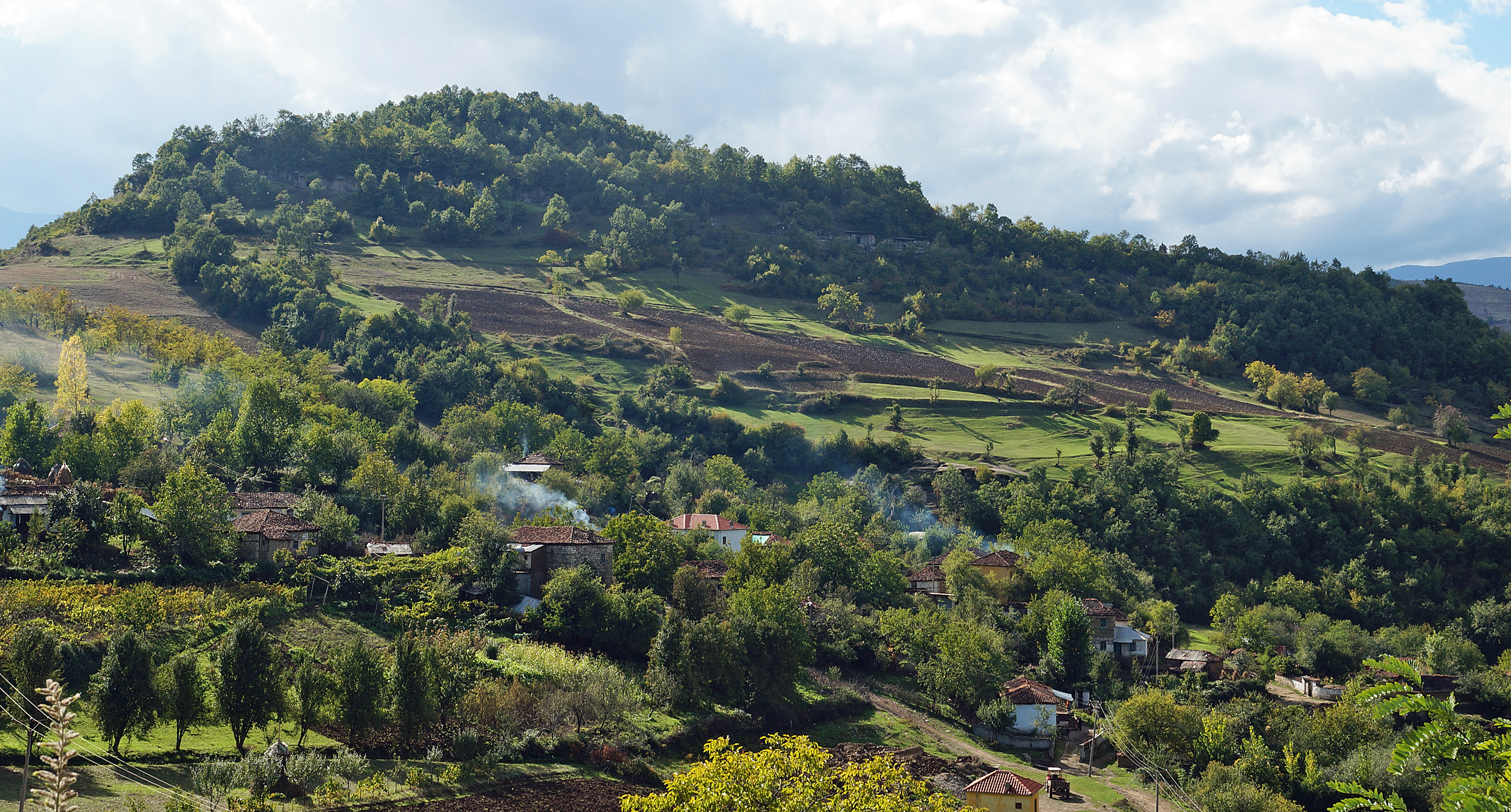
Selcë e Poshtme

In the 4th and 3rd centuries BC Selca was an important trading centre and was the administrative centre of the Illyrian region of the Dassaretae. Terraces were created in order to develop the settlement across the hilly terrain. In the 3rd century monumental tombs were cut into the rock around the acropolis, some with Ionic columns. One of these tombs was reused at the end of the 2nd century and a wide array of finds were discovered therein, including weapons, bronze vessels, ceramics and gold jewellery.

The construction of the Via Egnatia, which bypassed the city, led to its decline. During the 4th century AD Selca, as a military and administrative centre, was re-fortified with stone walls bound with mortar. Houses were constructed from reused Roman and Illyrian masonry. On the basis of coin finds two elements phases of construction can be determined. The first from the time of Valentinian I (364-375), the second from the time of Justinian I (518 - 565) to the years 547/548. The city was of economic and political importance before being conquered by the Slavs who destroyed the last remains of the Illyrian city.

== The Tombs ==
The royal tombs are located under the Acropolis, carved into the rock, and created during the reign of the Illyrian kings (4th to 3rd centuries BC)

=== Tomb I - Rock chamber burial with Ionic order (4th to 3rd centuries BC) ===
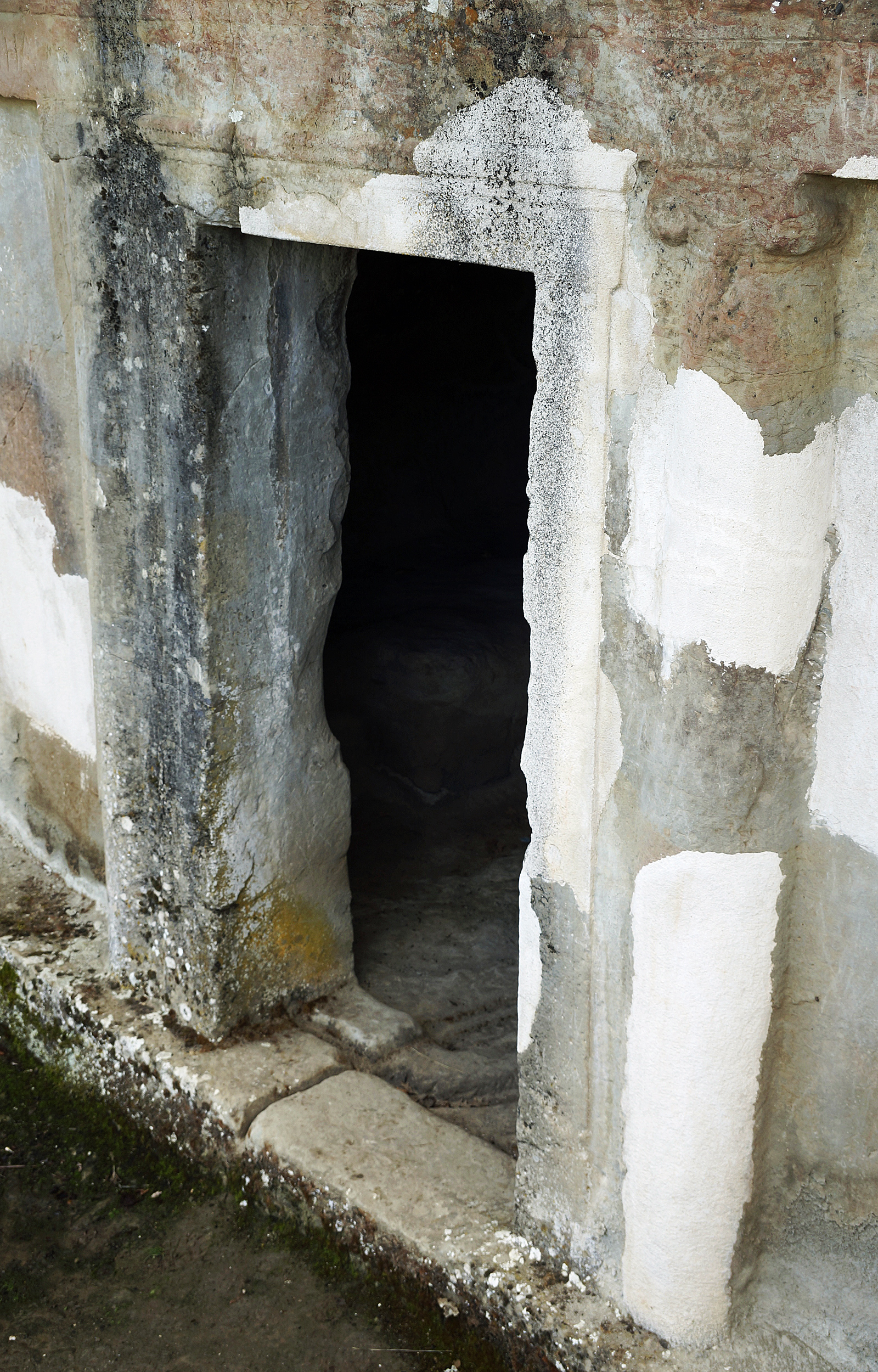
Tomb I

Tomb I consists of a rectangular burial chamber with an antechamber or forecourt. A barrel vault covers the burial chamber, whose height is 2.10m. Outside the door there is a rain gutter and mortises. The facade of the tomb has a colonnade of Doric pilasters with capitals resembling the Ionic order decorate the facade on which traces of painting can still be seen, with an entablature above. The doorway is substantial. In the burial chamber, there are two rock-cut couches, one against the side wall and the other against the rear wall. This tomb is oriented towards the Macedonian monumental tomb from the second half of the 4th century BC.

=== Tomb II - Theatre burial (mid-3rd century BC) ===
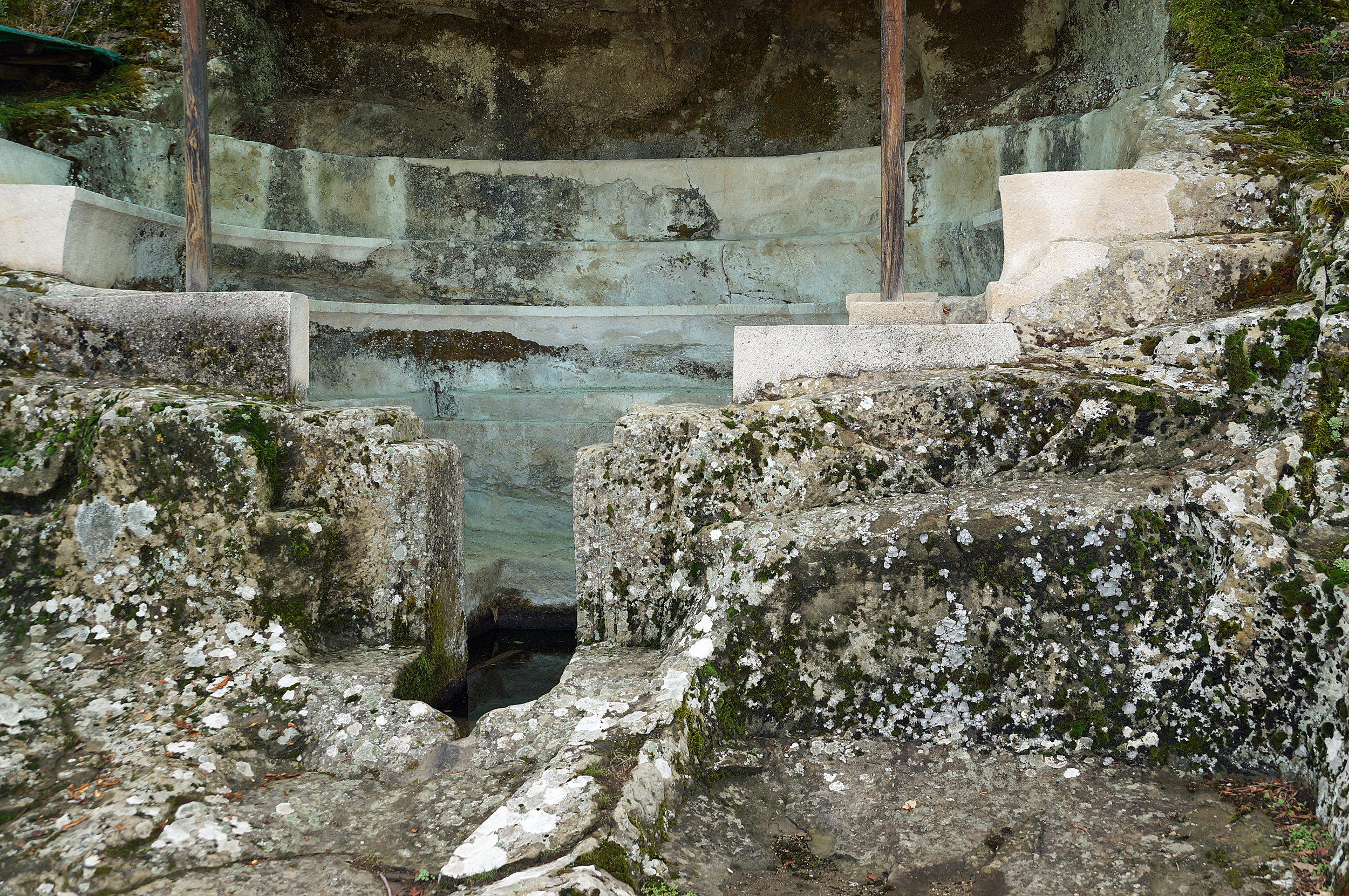
Tomb II

Tomb II has two elements: below is a rectangular burial chamber with stairs leading down. It would originally have been sealed with stone slabs. Above there is a theatre-like complex with two stepped rows of seats that could have served for any rituals or family visits to do with the deceased.

=== Tomb III - Central burial (mid-3rd century BC) ===
This tomb is on two levels. The upper level is a rock cut exedra as an Ionic hemicycle, with eight pilasters whose capitals were made separately flanking the entrance. To the left there is a niche with a relief engraved with a Bucranium and a helmet of the Pergamene type. To the right is a relief of an Illyrian-Macedonian shield. The floor of the tomb had a mosaic, but nothing of this remains. The door, which would have been sealed, leads to a narrow chamber. Gilkes considers that this chamber may have been abandoned due to the irregularity of the rock, and that the chamber below may have been cut as a result. A fault in the rock, and rough pick marks, are visible. The second chamber has a high barrel vault and contained two beautifully carved sarcophagi in the form of couches. 10 burials were recovered from this chamber, some in the sarcophagi and others in the floor. A second burial period is attested. These date to the last decades of the 3rd century and produced many grave goods, now on display in Tirana. Some scholars believe that this may have been the tomb of a royal family or dynasty. Among the grave goods are golden earrings, necklaces, pins, rings, all of the Hellenistic type, belt fittings, iron, a silver ornament depicting a battle scene, armour, spear points and 30 ceramic vessels.

=== Tomb IV (second half of the 3rd century BC) ===
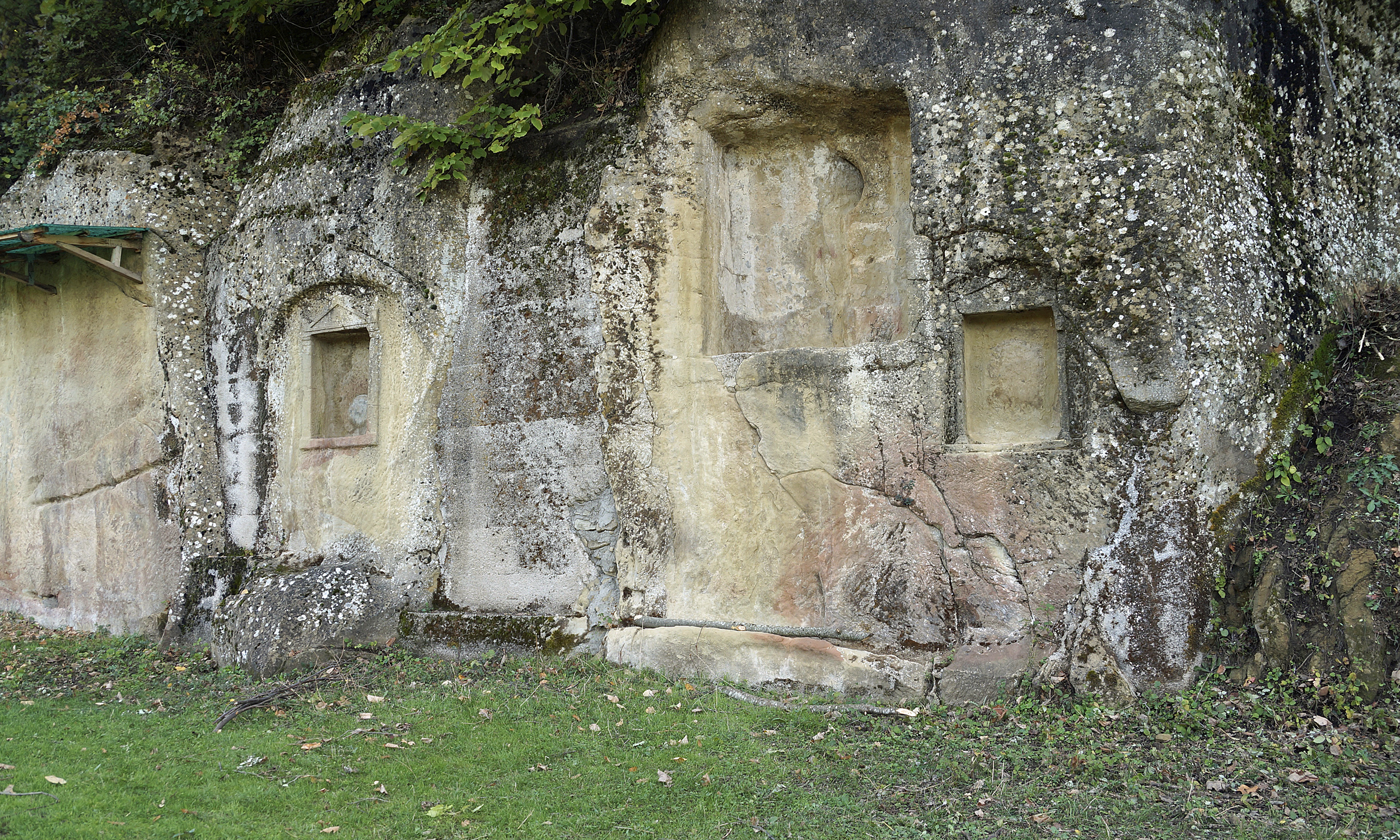
Part of the facade of Tomb IV

Tomb IV has a 5 m high facade with two separately carved Ionic columns and the entablature and tympanum of a temple. It is the most monumental of all. The facade is no longer in situ, though some parts can be seen on the ground. There was originally a double leaved stone door. The slots in the threshold are clearly visible. The burial chamber roofed is carved into a barrel vault and was originally covered in painted plaster. The chamber contains a single sarcophagus of stone slabs, which was robbed in antiquity. The grave dates from the second half of the 3rd century BC. Seven niches are carved into the rock of the long facade, partially covered with inscriptions that could have been made by the builder or the work supervisor, according to archaeologists. They date from the 1st century BC

=== Tomb V (late 3rd century) ===
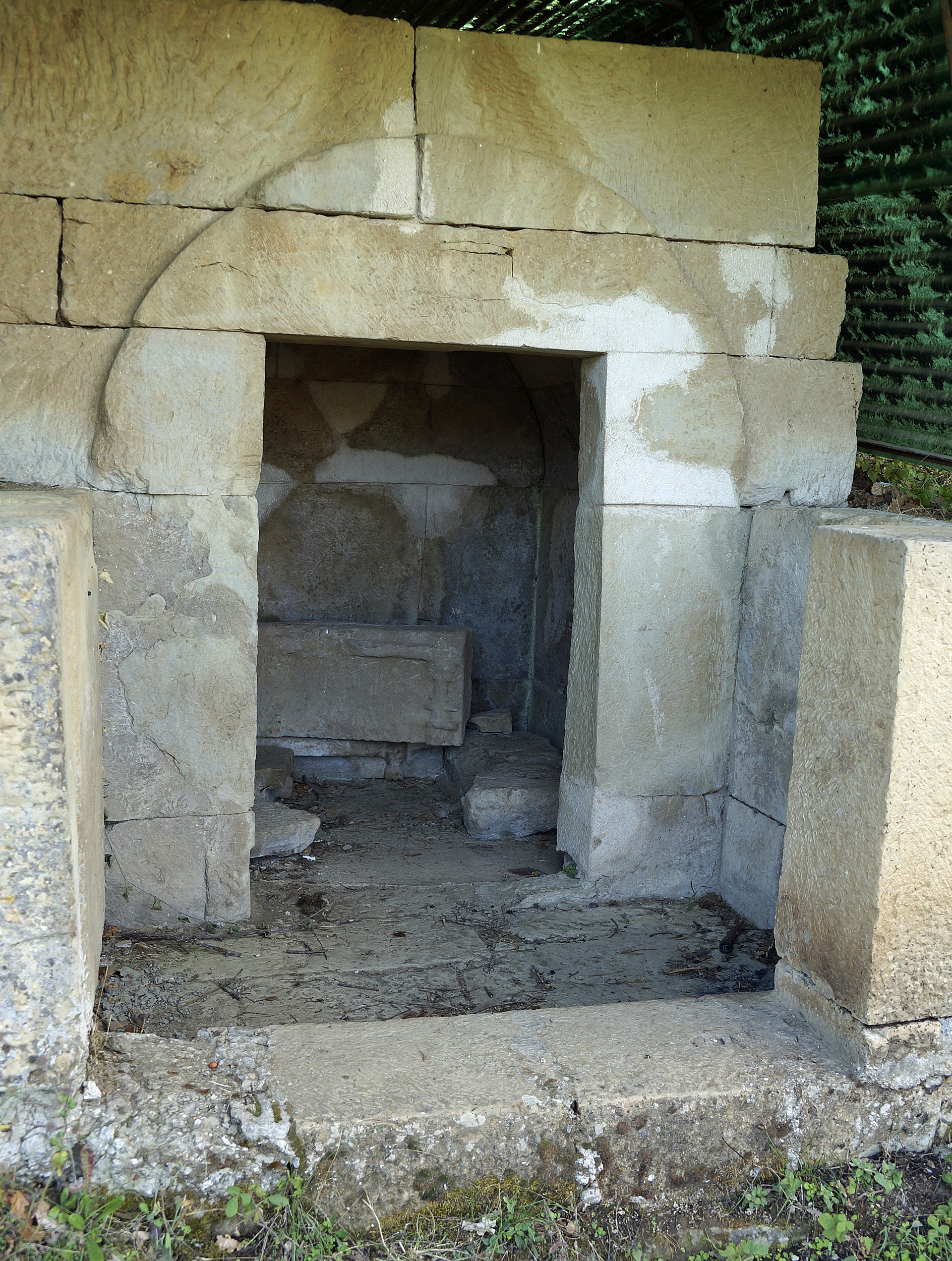
Tomb V

The last tomb has the shape of a Macedonian built tomb and consists of an antechamber and the actual burial chamber, both covered and built in ashlar construction. A stone slab with relief serves as a false door to the grave chamber. In the chamber itself are the remains of three sarcophagi in the form of klinai, built of upright stone blocks. They were used primarily for body burials. Later, urns and grave goods were laid in the sarcophagus. The tomb was robbed in antiquity.
