= Albanian language =

Indo-European language

Albanian
- shqip gjuha shqipe arbërisht
- Pronunciation: [ʃcip] [ˈɟuha ˈʃcipɛ] [aɾbəˈɾiʃt]
- Native to: Albania; Kosovo; Greece; Italy; Montenegro; North Macedonia; Serbia
- Ethnicity: Albanians
- Native speakers: 7.5 million (2017)
- Language family: Indo-European: Albanoid; Albanian
- Early forms: Proto-Indo-European: Proto-Albanian
- Dialects: Gheg (Arbanasi · Istrian† · Upper Reka · Malsia e Madhe); Tosk (Arbëresh · Arvanitika · Cham · Lab)
- Writing system: Latin (Albanian alphabet); Albanian Braille

Official status
- Official language in: Albania; Kosovo; North Macedonia (co-official); Montenegro (co-official)
- Recognised minority language in: Italy; Serbia; Croatia; Romania
- Regulated by: Academy of Sciences of Albania; Academy of Sciences and Arts of Kosovo

Language codes
- ISO 639-1: sq
- ISO 639-2: alb (B) sqi (T)
- ISO 639-3: sqi – inclusive code Individual codes: aae – Arbëresh aat – Arvanitika aln – Gheg als – Tosk
- Glottolog: alba1267
- Linguasphere: 55-AAA-a
- The dialects of the Albanian language in Southern Europe (Note: The map does not indicate where the language is majority or minority.)

Albanian (endonym: shqip [ʃcip], gjuha shqipe [ˈɟuha ˈʃcipɛ], or arbërisht [aɾbəˈɾiʃt]) is an Indo-European language and the only surviving representative of the Albanic branch, which belongs to the Paleo-Balkan group. It is the native language of the Albanian people. Standard Albanian is the official language of Albania and Kosovo, and a co-official language in North Macedonia and Montenegro, where it is the primary language of significant Albanian minority communities. Albanian is recognized as a minority language in Italy, Croatia, Romania, and Serbia. It is also spoken by long-established communities in Greece, and by the Albanian diaspora, which is generally concentrated in the Americas, Europe, and Oceania. Albanian is estimated to have as many as 7.5 million native speakers.

Albanian and other Paleo-Balkan languages had their formative core in the Balkans after the Indo-European migrations in the region. Albanian in antiquity is often thought to have been an Illyrian language for obvious geographic and historical reasons, or otherwise an unmentioned Balkan Indo-European language that was closely related to Illyrian and Messapic. The Indo-European subfamily that gave rise to Albanian is called Albanoid in reference to a specific ethnolinguistically pertinent and historically compact language group. Whether descendants or sisters of what was called 'Illyrian' by classical sources, Albanian and Messapic, on the basis of shared features and innovations, are grouped together in a common branch in the current phylogenetic classification of the Indo-European language family.

The first written mention of the Albanian language was in 1284 in a witness testimony from the Republic of Ragusa, while a letter written by Dominican Friar Gulielmus Adea in 1332 mentions the Albanians using the Latin alphabet in their writings. The oldest surviving attestation of modern Albanian is from 1462. The two main Albanian dialect groups (or varieties), Gheg and Tosk, are primarily distinguished by phonological differences and are mutually intelligible in their standard varieties, with Gheg spoken to the north and Tosk spoken to the south of the Shkumbin river. Their characteristics in the treatment of both native words and loanwords provide evidence that the split into the northern and the southern dialects occurred after Christianisation of the region (4th century AD), and most likely not later than the 6th century AD, hence possibly occupying roughly their present area divided by the Shkumbin river since the Post-Roman and Pre-Slavic period, straddling the Jireček Line.

Centuries-old communities speaking Albanian dialects can be found scattered in Greece (the Arvanites and some communities in Epirus, Western Macedonia and Western Thrace), Croatia (the Arbanasi), Italy (the Arbëreshë) as well as in Romania, Turkey and Ukraine. The Malsia e Madhe Gheg Albanian and two varieties of the Tosk dialect, Arvanitika in Greece and Arbëresh in southern Italy, have preserved archaic elements of the language. Ethnic Albanians constitute a large diaspora, with many having long assimilated in different cultures and communities. Consequently, Albanian-speakers do not correspond to the total ethnic Albanian population, as many ethnic Albanians may identify as Albanian but are unable to speak the language.

Standard Albanian is a standardised form of spoken Albanian based mainly on Tosk.

== Geographic distribution ==
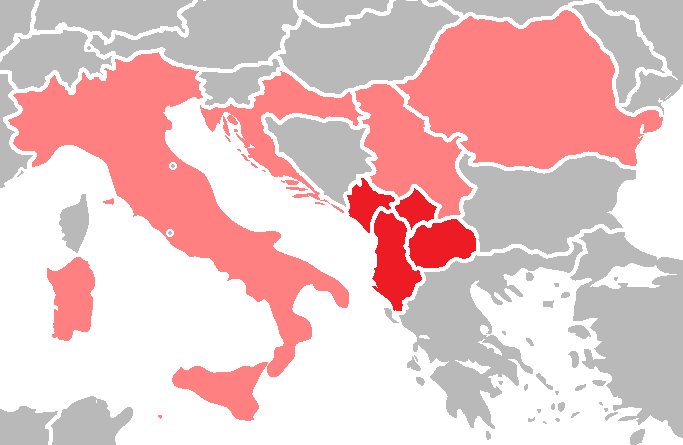
Map of countries where Albanian holds official status: Official language Recognised minority language

The language is spoken by approximately 6 million people in the Balkans, primarily in Albania, Kosovo, North Macedonia, Serbia, Montenegro and Greece. However, due to old communities in Italy (originating from Skanderbeg's times) and the large Albanian diaspora, the worldwide total of speakers is much higher than in Southern Europe and numbers approximately 7.5 million.

=== Europe ===
The Albanian language is the official language of Albania and Kosovo and a co-official language in North Macedonia and Montenegro. Albanian is a recognised minority language in Croatia, Italy, Romania and in Serbia. Albanian is also spoken by a minority in Greece, specifically in the Thesprotia and Preveza regional units and in a few villages in Ioannina and Florina regional units in Greece. It is also spoken by 450,000 Albanian immigrants in Greece, making it one of the commonly spoken languages in the country after Greek.

Albanian is the third most common mother tongue among foreign residents in Italy. This is due to a substantial Albanian immigration to Italy. Italy has a historical Albanian minority of about 500,000, scattered across southern Italy, known as Arbëreshë. Approximately 1 million Albanians from Kosovo are dispersed throughout Germany, Switzerland and Austria. These are mainly immigrants from Kosovo who migrated during the 1990s. In Switzerland, the Albanian language is the sixth most spoken language with 176,293 native speakers.

Albanian became an official language in North Macedonia on 15 January 2019, due to the large Albanian minority in North Macedonia.

=== Americas ===
There are large numbers of Albanian speakers in the United States, Argentina, Chile, Uruguay, and Canada. Some of the first ethnic Albanians to arrive in the United States were part of the Arbëreshë community. The Arbëreshë have a strong sense of identity and are unique in that they speak an archaic dialect of Tosk Albanian called Arbëresh.

In the United States and Canada, there are approximately 250,000 Albanian speakers. It is primarily spoken on the East Coast of the United States, in cities like New York City, Boston, Chicago, Philadelphia, and Detroit, as well as in parts of the states of New Jersey, Ohio, and Connecticut.

In Argentina, there are nearly 40,000 Albanian speakers, mostly in Buenos Aires.

=== Asia and Africa ===
Approximately 1.3 million people of Albanian ancestry live in Turkey, with more than 500,000 recognizing their ancestry, language, and culture. There are other estimates, however, that place the number of people in Turkey with Albanian ancestry and or background upward to 5 million. However, the vast majority of this population is assimilated and no longer possesses fluency in the Albanian language, though a vibrant Albanian community maintains its distinct identity in Istanbul to this day.

Egypt also lays claim to about 18,000 Albanians, mostly Tosk speakers. Many are descendants of the Janissary of Muhammad Ali Pasha, an Albanian who became Wāli, and self-declared Khedive of Egypt and Sudan. In addition to the dynasty that he established, a large part of the former Egyptian and Sudanese aristocracy was of Albanian origin. In addition to the recent emigrants, there are older diasporic communities around the world.

=== Oceania ===
Albanian is also spoken by Albanian diaspora communities residing in Australia and New Zealand.

=== Number of native speakers ===
The following table provides data on the number of native Albanian speakers by country, according to the most recent publicly available sources. The number of speakers is presented as an absolute value for the total population, obtained by projecting the valid answers to the total population (thus not taking into account unanswered questionnaires, missing data or excluded age ranges).

Distribution of Albanian native speakers by country
1. Albania (36.2%)
2. Kosovo (22.9%)
3. Germany (9.20%)
4. North Macedonia (7.40%)
5. Italy (6.50%)
6. Greece (5.80%)
7. Switzerland (4.70%)
8. United States (2.90%)
9. Others (4.30%)

Country	Speakers	Percentage	Source	Definition	Notes
Albania	2,347,700	97.7%	2023 census	Adult literacy rate	The population aged 15 years and over.
Australia	11,510	0.05%	2021 census	Language spoken at home	
Austria	28,212	0.35%	2001 census	Colloquial language	
Bosnia Herzegovina	2,420	0.07%	2013 census	Mother tongue	
Canada	32,305	0.09%	2021 census	Mother tongue	
Croatia	13,576	0.35%	2021 census	Mother tongue	
England and Wales	54,045	0.09%	2021 census	Main language	Usual residents aged 3 years and over.
Finland	17,779	0.32%	2023 official survey	Mother tongue	
Germany	601,000	0.73%	2024 microcensus	Language spoken at home	
Greece	374,926	3.57%	2021 census	Citizenship	Better source needed. Used Albanian citizens for a rough estimate.
Italy	420,955	0.71%	2011 official survey	Mother tongue	Only foreign residents aged 6 and over. Does not include Arbëresh language.
Kosovo	1,485,170	92.7%	2024 census	Mother tongue	The census was partly boycotted by Kosovo Serbs.
Luxembourg	1,357	0.24%	2021 census	Main language	
Montenegro	32,715	5.25%	2023 census	Mother tongue	
Netherlands	13,466	0.08%	2022 official survey	Ancestry from Albania and Kosovo	
North Macedonia	481,800	26.23%	2023 census	Mother tongue	
Serbia	69,570	1.04%	2022 census	Mother tongue	
Slovenia	7,373	0.38%	2002 census	Mother tongue	
Switzerland	306,507	3.39%	2023 official survey	Main language	
United States	186,621	0.06%	2023 official survey	Language spoken at home	Population 5 years and older
Total	6,489,007				

== Dialects ==
The dialects of the Albanian language

- Albanian
  - Tosk
    - Northern Tosk
    - Labërisht
    - Cham
    - Arvanitika
    - Arbëresh
  - Gheg
    - Northwest Gheg
    - Northeast Gheg
    - Central Gheg
    - Southern Gheg

The Albanian language has two distinct dialects, Tosk which is spoken in the south, and Gheg spoken in the north. Standard Albanian is based on the Tosk dialect. The Shkumbin River is the rough dividing line between the two dialects.

Gheg is divided into four sub-dialects: Northwest Gheg, Northeast Gheg, Central Gheg and Southern Gheg. It is primarily spoken in northern Albania, Kosovo, and throughout Montenegro and northwestern North Macedonia. One fairly divergent dialect is the Upper Reka dialect, which is however classified as Central Gheg. There is also a diaspora dialect in Croatia, the Arbanasi dialect.

Tosk is divided into five sub-dialects, including Northern Tosk (the most numerous in speakers), Labërisht, Cham, Arvanitika, and Arbëresh. Tosk is spoken in southern Albania, southwestern North Macedonia and northern and southern Greece. Cham Albanian is spoken in North-western Greece, while Arvanitika is spoken by the Arvanites in southern Greece. In addition, Arbëresh is spoken by the Arbëreshë people, descendants of 15th and 16th century migrants who settled in southeastern Italy, in small communities in the regions of Sicily and Calabria. These settlements originated from the (Arvanites) communities probably of Peloponnese known as Morea in the Middle Ages. Among them the Arvanites call themselves Arbëror and sometime Arbëresh. The Arbëresh dialect is closely related to the Arvanites dialect with more Italian vocabulary absorbed during different periods of time.

== Orthography ==
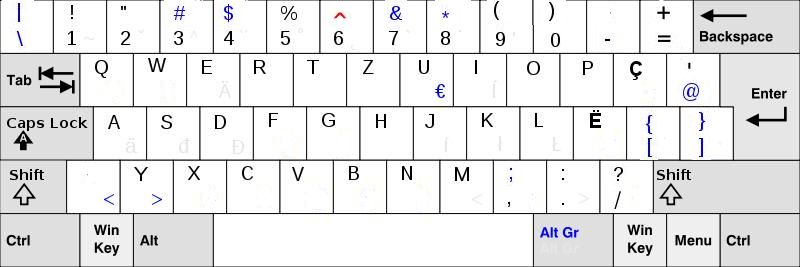
Albanian keyboard layout

The Albanian language has been written using many alphabets since the earliest records from the 15th century. The history of Albanian language orthography is closely related to the cultural orientation and knowledge of certain foreign languages among Albanian writers. The earliest written Albanian records come from the Gheg area in makeshift spellings based on Italian or Greek. Originally, the Tosk dialect was written in the Greek alphabet and the Gheg dialect was written in the Latin script. Both dialects had also been written in the Ottoman Turkish version of the Arabic script, Cyrillic, and some local alphabets (Elbasan, Vithkuqi, Todhri, Veso Bey, Jan Vellara and others, see original Albanian alphabets). More specifically, the writers from northern Albania and under the influence of the Catholic Church used Latin letters, those in southern Albania and under the influence of the Greek Orthodox church used Greek letters, while others throughout Albania and under the influence of Islam used Arabic letters. There were initial attempts to create an original Albanian alphabet during the 1750–1850 period. These attempts intensified after the League of Prizren and culminated with the Congress of Manastir held by Albanian intellectuals from 14 to 22 November 1908, in Manastir (present day Bitola), which decided on which alphabet to use, and what the standardised spelling would be for standard Albanian. This is how the literary language remains. The alphabet is the Latin alphabet with the addition of the letters ⟨ë⟩, ⟨ç⟩, and nine digraphs: dh, gj, ll, nj, rr, sh, th, xh and zh.

According to Robert Elsie:

The hundred years between 1750 and 1850 were an age of astounding orthographic diversity in Albania. In this period, the Albanian language was put to writing in at least ten different alphabets – most certainly a record for European languages. ... the diverse forms in which this old Balkan language was recorded, from the earliest documents to the beginning of the twentieth century ... consist of adaptations of the Latin, Greek, Arabic, and Cyrillic alphabets and (what is even more interesting) a number of locally invented writing systems. Most of the latter alphabets have now been forgotten and are unknown, even to the Albanians themselves.

== Classification ==
Albanian within Indo-European language family tree based on "Ancestry-constrained phylogenetic analysis of Indo-European languages" by Chang et al. (January 2015)

Albanian constitutes one of the eleven major branches of the Indo-European language family, within which it occupies an independent position. In 1854, Albanian was demonstrated to be an Indo-European language by the philologist Franz Bopp. Albanian was formerly compared by a few Indo-European linguists with Germanic and Balto-Slavic, all of which share a number of isoglosses with Albanian. Other linguists linked the Albanian language with Latin, Greek and Armenian, while placing Germanic and Balto-Slavic in another branch of Indo-European. In current scholarship there is evidence that Albanian is closely related to Greek and Armenian, while the fact that it is a satem language is less significant.

- Balkanic
  - Armenian
  - Graeco-Albanian
    - Graeco-Phrygian
      - Greek
      - Phrygian
        (extinct)
    - Illyric
      - Messapic
        (extinct)
      - Albanian
        - Gheg
        - Tosk

Albanian in the Palaeo-Balkanic Indo-European branch based on the chapters "Albanian" (Hyllested & Joseph 2022) and "Armenian" (Olsen & Thorsø 2022) in Olander (ed.) The Indo-European Language Family

Messapic is considered the closest language to Albanian, grouped in a common branch titled Illyric in Hyllested & Joseph (2022). Hyllested & Joseph (2022) in agreement with recent bibliography identify Greco-Phrygian as the IE branch closest to the Albanian-Messapic one. These two branches form an areal grouping – which is often called "Balkan IE" – with Armenian. The hypothesis of the "Balkan Indo-European" continuum posits a common period of prehistoric coexistence of several Indo-European dialects in the Balkans prior to 2000 BC. To this group would belong Albanian, Ancient Greek, Armenian, Phrygian, fragmentary attested languages such as Macedonian, Thracian, or Illyrian, and the relatively well-attested Messapic in Southern Italy. The common features of this group appear at the phonological, morphological, and lexical levels, presumably resulting from the contact between the various languages. The concept of this linguistic group is explained as a kind of language league of the Bronze Age (a specific areal-linguistics phenomenon), although it also consisted of languages that were related to each other. A common prestage posterior to PIE comprising Albanian, Greek, and Armenian, is considered as a possible scenario. In this light, due to the larger number of possible shared innovations between Greek and Armenian, it appears reasonable to assume, at least tentatively, that Albanian was the first Balkan IE language to branch off. This split and the following ones were perhaps very close in time, allowing only a narrow time frame for shared innovations.

Albanian represents one of the core languages of the Balkan Sprachbund.

Glottolog and Ethnologue recognize four Albanian languages. They are classified as follows:

- Indo-European
  - Albanian
    - Tosk
      - Northern Tosk Albanian
      - Southern Tosk
        - Arbëreshë Albanian
        - Arvanitika Albanian
    - Gheg Albanian

=== Old Albanian ===
According to the central hypothesis of a project undertaken by the Austrian Science Fund, Old Albanian had a significant influence on the development of many languages in the Balkans. This little-known language is being researched using all available texts before a comparison with other Balkan languages is carried out. One outcome of the research in this area was the publication of a book (written in German) on the verbs of Old Albanian, entitled Die Verben des Altalbanischen: Belegwörterbuch, Vorgeschichte und Etymologie (2013), written by Stefan Schumacher and Joachim Matzinger. As project leader, Dr. Schumacher stated:

So far, our work has shown that Old Albanian contained numerous modal levels that allowed the speaker to express a particular stance to what was being said. Compared to the existing knowledge and literature, these modal levels are actually more extensive and more nuanced than previously thought. We have also discovered a great many verbal forms that are now obsolete or have been lost through restructuring—until now, these forms have barely even been recognized or, at best, have been classified incorrectly.

These verbal forms are crucial to explaining the linguistic history of Albanian and its internal usage. However, they can also shed light on the reciprocal relationship between Albanian and its neighbouring languages. The researchers are following various leads which suggest that Albanian played a key role in the Balkan Sprachbund. For example, it has been proposed that Albanian is the source of the suffixed definite article in Romanian, Bulgarian and Macedonian, as this has been a feature of Albanian since ancient times.

== History ==
=== Historical documentation ===
The first attested written mention of the Albanian language was on 14 July 1284 in Ragusa in modern Croatia (Dubrovnik) when a crime witness named Matthew testified: "I heard a voice crying on the mountain in the Albanian language" (Latin: Audivi unam vocem, clamantem in monte in lingua albanesca).

The Albanian language is also mentioned in the Descriptio Europae Orientalis dated 1308:

Habent enim Albani prefati linguam distinctam a Latinis, Grecis et Sclauis ita quod in nullo se intelligunt cum aliis nationibus. (Namely, the above-mentioned Albanians have a language that is different from the languages of Latins, Greeks and Slavs, so that they do not understand each other at all.)

The oldest attested document written in Albanian dates to 1462. However, as Fortson notes, Albanian written works existed before this point; they have simply been lost. The existence of written Albanian is explicitly mentioned in a letter attested from 1332, and the first preserved books, including both those in Gheg and in Tosk, share orthographic features that indicate that some form of common literary language had developed.

The first printed books in Albanian are Meshari ('Missal') by Gjon Buzuku (1555), in a Gheg dialect, and E mbsuame e krështerë (Italian: Dottrina cristiana, 1592) by Lekë Matrënga (Italian: Luca Matranga), in a Tosk dialect as spoken by the Arbëreshë people in southern Italy.

By the Late Middle Ages, during the period of Humanism and the European Renaissance, the term lingua epirotica 'Epirotan language' was preferred in the intellectual, literary, and clerical circles of the time, and used as a synonym for the Albanian language. Published in Rome in 1635, by the Albanian bishop and writer Frang Bardhi, the first dictionary of the Albanian language was titled Latin: Dictionarium latino-epiroticum 'Latin-Epirotan dictionary'.

During the five-century period of the Ottoman presence in Albania, the language was not officially recognised until 1909, when the Congress of Dibra decided that Albanian schools would finally be allowed.

The first audio recording in the language was made by Norbert Jokl on 4 April 1914 in Vienna.

=== Linguistic affinities ===
Albanian is an isolate within the Indo-European language family; no other language has been conclusively linked to its branch. The only other languages that are the sole surviving members of a branch of Indo-European are Armenian and Greek. (Note: "... in Figure 2.1 are listed three subfamilies which contain only one language each: the Albanian, Hellenic, and Armenian subfamilies. These three languages – Albanian, Greek, and Armenian – are isolates within the Indo-European family showing no closer connection to any other Indo-European languages or to each other." — Pereltsvaig (2012) pp. 30–31)

The Albanian language is part of the Indo-European language family and the only surviving representative of its own branch, which belongs to the Paleo-Balkan group. However, it is still uncertain exactly which ancient language of the Balkans is the ancestor of Albanian or where in the region its speakers originally lived. (Note: "It is generally accepted that Albanians continue one of the ancient languages of the Balkans, although scholars disagree on which language they spoke and what area of the Balkans they occupied before the Slavs' migration to the Balkans." — Curtis (2011) p. 16) In general, there is insufficient evidence to connect Albanian with one of those languages, whether Illyrian, Thracian, or Dacian. (Note: "So while linguists may debate about the ties between Albanian and older languages of the Balkans, and while most Albanians may take the genealogical connection to Illyrian as incontrovertible, the fact remains that there is simply insufficient evidence to connect Illyrian, Thracian, or Dacian with any language, including Albanian." — Curtis (2011) p. 18) Among these possibilities, Illyrian is the most probable. (Note: "The most probable predecessor of Albanian was Illyrian since much of present-day Albania was inhabited by the Illyrians during the Antiquity, but the comparison of the two languages is impossible because almost nothing is known about Illyrian ... It is a-priori less probable to assume that a single language was spoken in the whole Illyricum, from the river Arsia in Istria, to Epirus in Greece, when such a linguistic uniformity is found nowhere else in Europe before the Roman conquest. Moreover, the examination of personal names and toponyms from Illyricum shows that several onomastic areas can be distinguished, and these onomastic areas just might correspond to different languages spoken in ancient Illyricum. If Illyrians actually spoke several different languages, the question arises: From which Illyrian language did Albanian develop? – and that question cannot be answered until new data are discovered." — Ranko (2012))

Although Albanian shares lexical isoglosses with Greek, Germanic, and to a lesser extent Balto-Slavic, the vocabulary of Albanian is quite distinct. In 1995, Taylor, Ringe, and Warnow used quantitative linguistic techniques that appeared to obtain an Albanian subgrouping with Germanic, a result which the authors had already reasonably downplayed. Indeed, the Albanian and Germanic branches share a relatively moderate number of lexical cognates. Many shared grammatical elements or features of these two branches do not corroborate the lexical isoglosses. Albanian also shares lexical linguistic affinity with Latin and Romance languages. Sharing linguistic features unique to the languages of the Balkans, Albanian also forms a part of the Balkan linguistic area or sprachbund.

=== Historical presence and location ===
The place and the time that the Albanian language was formed are uncertain. The American linguist Eric Hamp has said that during an unknown chronological period a pre-Albanian population (termed as "Albanoid" by Hamp) inhabited areas stretching from Poland to the southwestern Balkans. Further analysis has suggested that it was in a mountainous region rather than on a plain or seacoast. The words for plants and animals characteristic of mountainous regions are entirely original, but the names for fish and for agricultural activities (such as ploughing) are borrowed from other languages.

A deeper analysis of the vocabulary, however, shows that could be a consequence of a prolonged Latin domination of the coastal and plain areas of the country, rather than evidence of the original environment in which the Albanian language was formed. For example, the word for 'fish' is borrowed from Latin, but not the word for 'gills' which is native. Indigenous are also the words for 'ship', 'raft', 'navigation', 'sea shelves' and a few names of fish kinds, but not the words for 'sail', 'row' and 'harbor'; objects pertaining to navigation itself and a large part of sea fauna. This rather shows that Proto-Albanians were pushed away from coastal areas in early times (probably after the Latin conquest of the region) and thus lost a large amount (or the majority) of their sea environment lexicon. A similar phenomenon could be observed with agricultural terms. While the words for 'arable land', 'wheat', 'cereals', 'vineyard', 'yoke', 'harvesting', 'cattle breeding', etc. are native, the words for 'ploughing', 'farm' and 'farmer', agricultural practices, and some harvesting tools are foreign. This, again, points to intense contact with other languages and people, rather than providing evidence of a possible linguistic homeland (also known as a Urheimat).

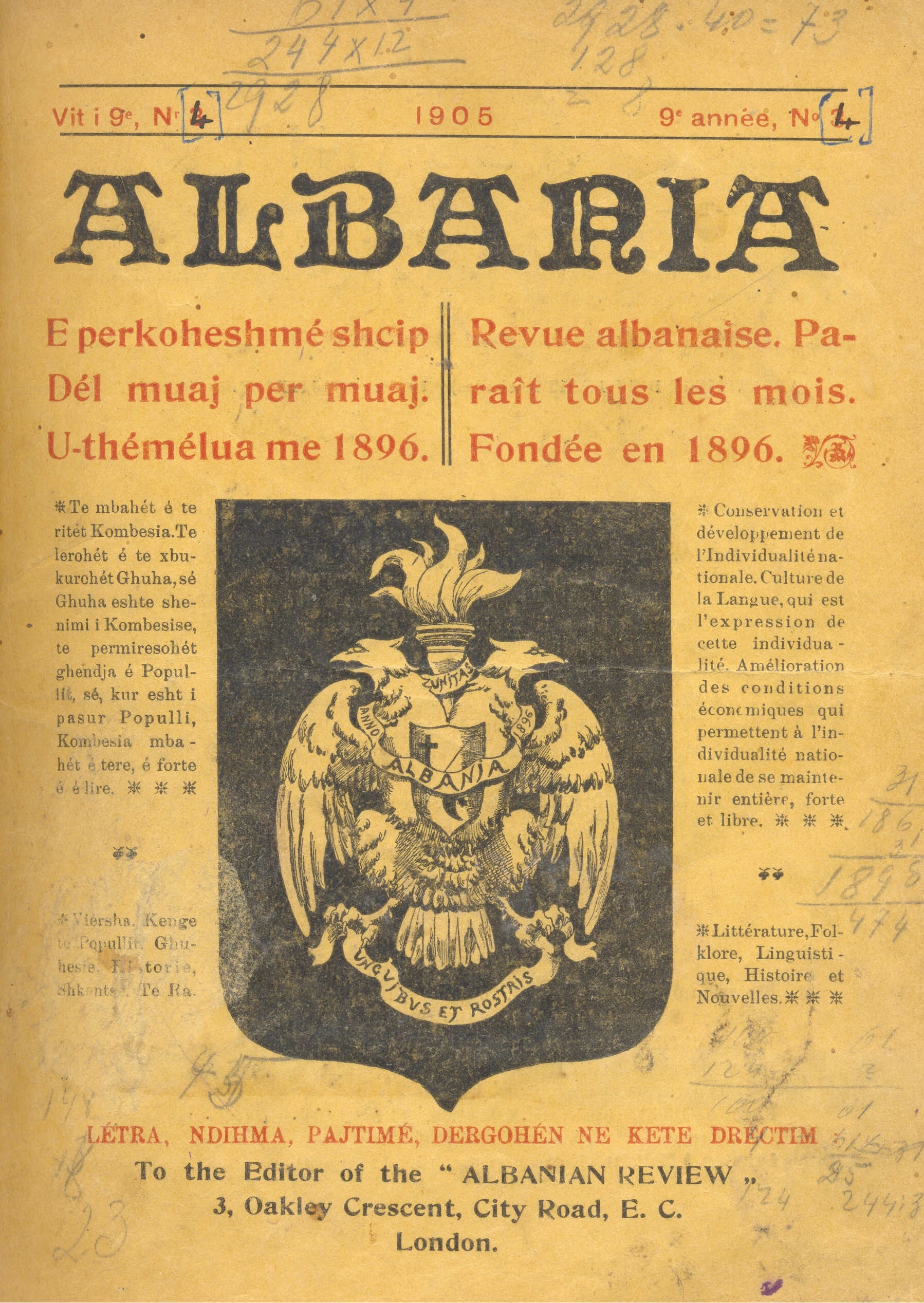
1905 issue of the magazine Albania, the most important Albanian periodical of the early 20th century

The centre of Albanian settlement remained the Mat River. In 1079, the Albanians were recorded further south in the valley of the Shkumbin River. The Shkumbin, a 181 km long river that lies near the old Via Egnatia, is approximately the boundary of the primary dialect division for Albanian, Tosk and Gheg. The characteristics of Tosk and Gheg in the treatment of the native words and loanwords from other languages are evidence that the dialectal split preceded the Slavic migrations to the Balkans, which means that in that period (the 5th to 6th centuries AD), Albanians were occupying nearly the same area around the Shkumbin river, which straddled the Jireček Line.

References to the existence of Albanian as a distinct language survive from the 14th century, but they failed to cite specific words. The oldest surviving documents written in Albanian are the "formula e pagëzimit" (Baptismal formula), Un'te paghesont' pr'emenit t'Atit e t'Birit e t'Spertit Senit. ("I baptize thee in the name of the Father, and the Son, and the Holy Spirit") recorded by Pal Engjelli, Bishop of Durrës in 1462 in the Gheg dialect, and some New Testament verses from that period.

The linguists Stefan Schumacher and Joachim Matzinger (University of Vienna) assert that the first literary records of Albanian date from the 16th century.

One of the earliest Albanian dictionaries was written in 1693; it was the Italian manuscript Pratichae Schrivaneschae authored by the Montenegrin sea captain Julije Balović and includes a multilingual dictionary of hundreds of the most frequently used words in everyday life in Italian, Slavic, Greek, Albanian, and Turkish.

=== Pre-Indo-European substratum ===
Pre-Indo-European (PreIE) sites are found throughout the territory of Albania. Such PreIE sites existed in Maliq, Vashtëmi, Burimas, Barç, Dërsnik in the Korçë District, Kamnik in Kolonja, Kolsh in the Kukës District, Rashtan in Librazhd, and Nezir in the Mat District. As in other parts of Europe, these PreIE people joined the migratory Indo-European tribes that entered the Balkans and contributed to the formation of the historical Paleo-Balkan tribes. In terms of linguistics, the pre-Indo-European substrate language spoken in the southern Balkans probably influenced pre-Proto-Albanian, the ancestor idiom of Albanian. The extent of this linguistic impact cannot be determined with precision due to the uncertain position of Albanian among Paleo-Balkan languages and their scarce attestation. Some loanwords, however, have been proposed, such as shegë 'pomegranate' or lëpjetë 'orach'; compare Pre-Greek λάπαθον, lápathon 'monk's rhubarb'.

== Literary tradition ==
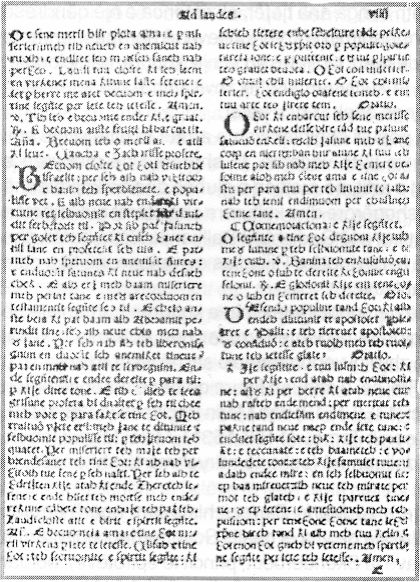
Meshari of Gjon Buzuku 1554–1555

=== Earliest undisputed texts ===
The earliest known texts in Albanian:

- the formula e pagëzimit (Baptismal Formula), which dates back to 1462 and was authored by Pal Engjëlli (or Paulus Angelus) (c. 1417 – 1470), Archbishop of Durrës. Engjëlli was a close friend and counsellor of Skanderbeg. It was written in a pastoral letter for a synod at the Holy Trinity in Mat and read in Latin characters as follows: Unte paghesont premenit Atit et Birit et Spertit Senit (standard Albanian: Unë të pagëzoj në emër të Atit, të Birit e të Shpirtit të Shenjtë; English: "I baptise you in the name of the Father and the Son and the Holy Spirit"). It was discovered and published in 1915 by Nicolae Iorga.
- the Fjalori i Arnold von Harfit (Arnold Ritter von Harff's lexicon), a short list of Albanian phrases with German glosses, dated 1496.
- a song, recorded in the Greek alphabet, retrieved from an old codex that was written in Greek. The document is also called Perikopeja e Ungjillit të Pashkëve or Perikopeja e Ungjillit të Shën Mateut ("The Song of the Easter Gospel, or "The Song of Saint Matthew's Gospel"). Although the codex is dated to during the 14th century, the song, written in Albanian by an anonymous writer, seems to be a 16th-century writing. The document was found by Arbëreshë people who had emigrated to Italy in the 15th century.

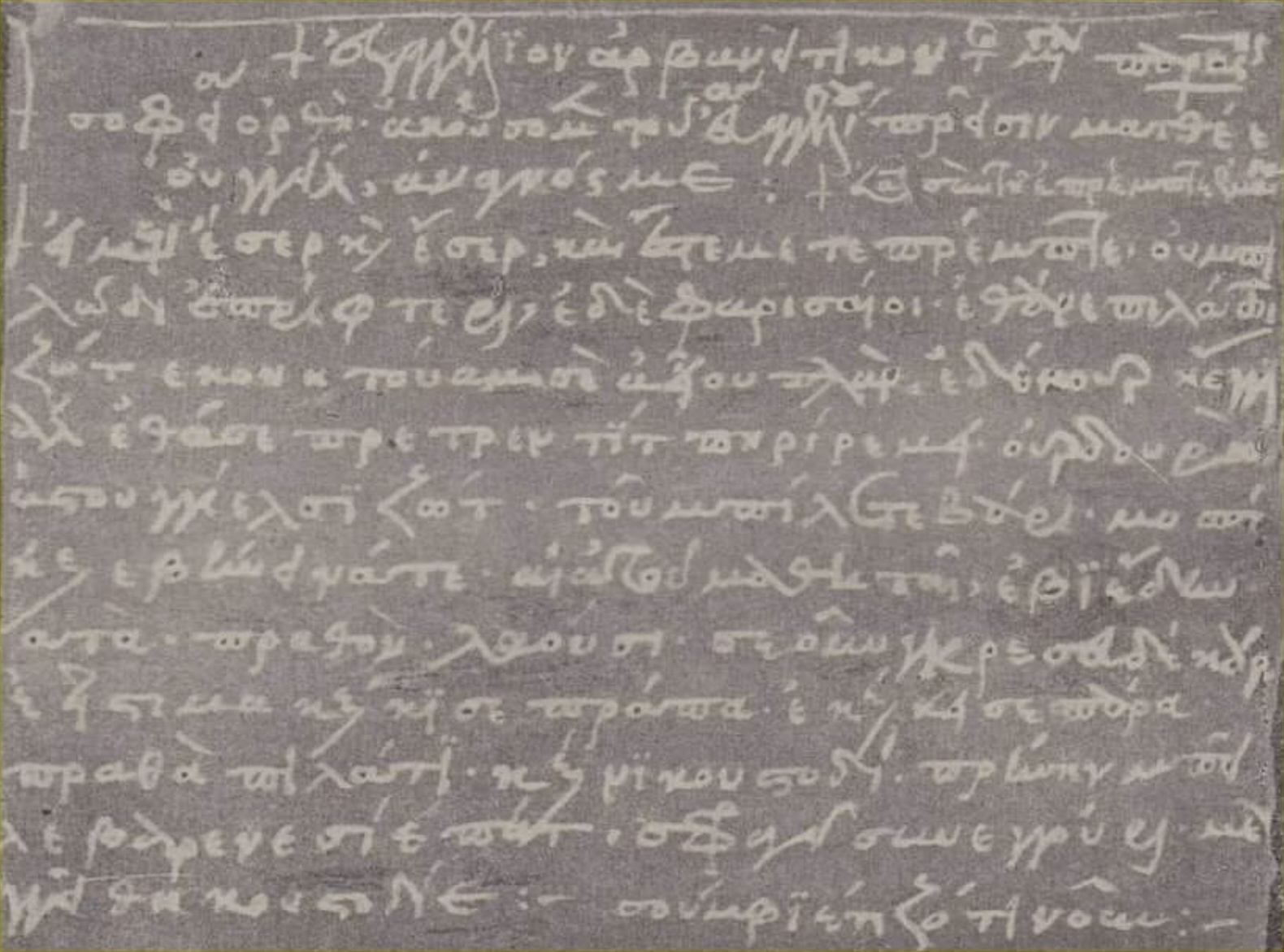
Perikopeja e Ungjillit të Shën Mateut

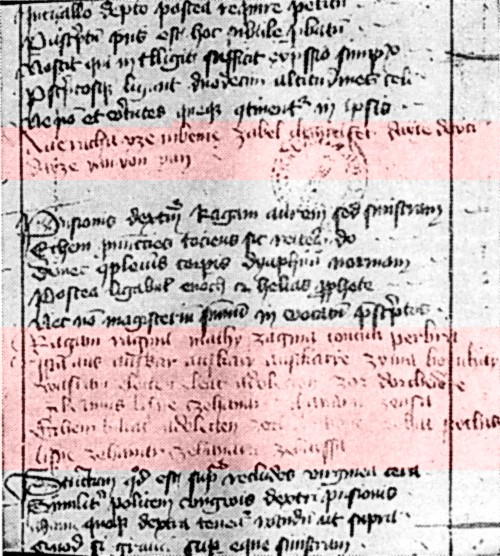
Possibly the oldest surviving Albanian text, highlighted in red, from the Bellifortis manuscript, written by Konrad Kyeser around 1402–1405

- The first book in Albanian is the Meshari ("The Missal"), written by Gjon Buzuku between 20 March 1554 and 5 January 1555. The book was written in the Gheg dialect in the Latin script with some Slavic letters adapted for Albanian vowels. The book was discovered in 1740 by Gjon Nikollë Kazazi, the Albanian archbishop of Skopje. It contains the liturgies of the main holidays. There are also texts of prayers and rituals and catechetical texts. The grammar and the vocabulary are more archaic than those in the Gheg texts from the 17th century. The 188 pages of the book comprise about 154,000 words with a total vocabulary of c. 1,500 different words. The text is archaic yet easily interpreted because it is mainly a translation of known texts, in particular portions of the Bible. The book also contains passages from the Psalms, the Book of Isaiah, the Book of Jeremiah, the Letters to the Corinthians, and many illustrations. The uniformity of spelling seems to indicate an earlier tradition of writing. The only known copy of the Meshari is held by the Apostolic Library. In 1968 the book was published with transliterations and comments by linguists.
- The first printed work in Tosk Albanian is the Mbsuame e krështerë (in Italian: Dottrina cristiana) by Lekë Matrënga or (in Italian) Luca Matranga. It was published in 1592 and is written in an early form of the Arbëresh language (also known as Italo-Albanian).

Albanian scripts were produced earlier than the first attested document, formula e pagëzimit, but none yet have been discovered. We know of their existence by earlier references. For example, a French monk signed as "Broccardus" notes, in 1332, that "Although the Albanians have another language totally different from Latin, they still use Latin letters in all their books".

=== Disputed earlier texts ===
In 1967 two scholars claimed to have found a Letter text in Albanian inserted into the Bellifortis text, a book written in Latin dating to 1402–1405.

"A star has fallen in a place in the woods, distinguish the star, distinguish it.

Distinguish the star from the others, they are ours, they are.
Do you see where the great voice has resounded? Stand beside it
That thunder. It did not fall. It did not fall for you, the one which would do it.
...
Like the ears, you should not believe ... that the moon fell when ...
Try to encompass that which spurts far ...

Call the light when the moon falls and no longer exists ..."

Robert Elsie, a specialist in Albanian studies, considers that "The Todericiu/Polena Romanian translation of the non-Latin lines, although it may offer some clues if the text is indeed Albanian, is fanciful and based, among other things, on a false reading of the manuscript, including the exclusion of a whole line."

=== Ottoman period ===
In 1635, Frang Bardhi (1606–1643) published in Rome his Dictionarum latinum-epiroticum, the first known Latin-Albanian dictionary. Other scholars who studied the language during the 17th century include Andrea Bogdani (1600–1685), author of the first Latin-Albanian grammar book, Nilo Katalanos (1637–1694) and others.

== Indo-European features ==
=== PIE phonological correspondences ===
Phonologically, Albanian is not so conservative. Like many IE stocks, it has merged the two series of voiced stops (e.g. both PIE *d and *dʰ became Albanian: d). In addition, voiced stops tend to disappear in between vowels. There is almost complete loss of final syllables and very widespread loss of other unstressed syllables (e.g. mik 'friend' from Lat. amicus). PIE *o appears as a (also as e if a high front vowel i follows), while PIE *ē and *ā become o, and PIE *ō appears as e.

The palatals, velars, and labiovelars show distinct developments, with Albanian showing the three-way distinction also found in Luwian. Labiovelars are for the most part differentiated from all other Indo-European velar series before front vowels, but they merge with the "pure" (back) velars elsewhere. The palatal velar series, consisting of Proto-Indo-European *ḱ and the merged *ģ and *ģʰ, usually developed into *th and *dh, but were depalatalised to merge with the back velars when in contact with sonorants. Because the original Proto-Indo-European tripartite distinction between dorsals is preserved in such reflexes, Albanian is therefore neither centum nor satem, despite having a "satem-like" realization of the palatal dorsals in most cases. Thus PIE *ḱ, *k, and *kʷ become th, q, and s, respectively (before back vowels PIE *ḱ becomes th, while *k and *kʷ merge as k).

A minority of scholars reconstruct a fourth laryngeal *h₄ allegedly surfacing as Alb. h word-initially, e.g. Alb. herdhe 'testicles' presumably from PIE *h₄órǵʰi- (rather than the usual reconstruction *h₃erǵʰi-), but this is generally not followed elsewhere, as h- has arisen elsewhere idiosyncratically (for example Alb. hark < Lat. arcus).

Reflexes of PIE bilabial plosives in Albanian
PIE	Albanian	PIE	Albanian
*p	p	*pékʷ- 'to cook'	pjek 'to bake'
*bʰ / b	b	*srobʰ-éi̯e- 'to sip, gulp'	gjerb 'to sip'

Reflexes of PIE coronal plosives in Albanian
PIE	Albanian	PIE	Albanian
*t	t	*túh_{2} 'thou'	ti 'you (singular)'
*d	d	*dih_{2}tis 'light'	ditë 'day'
	dh (Note: Between vowels or after r)	*pérd- 'to fart'	pjerdh 'to fart'
	g	*dl̥h_{1}-tó- 'long'	gjatë 'long' (Tosk dial. glatë)
*dʰ	d	*dʰégʷʰ- 'burn'	djeg 'to burn'
	dh	*gʰórdʰos 'enclosure'	gardh 'fence'

Reflexes of PIE palatal plosives in Albanian
PIE	Albanian	PIE	Albanian
*ḱ	th	*ḱéh_{1}smi 'I say'	them 'I say'
	s (Note: Before u̯/u or i̯/i)	*ḱupo- 'shoulder'	sup 'shoulder'
	k (Note: Before sonorant)	*smeḱ-r̥ 'chin'	mjekër 'chin; beard'
	ç/c (Note: Archaic relic)	*ḱentro- 'to stick'	çandër 'prop'
*ǵ	dh	*ǵómbʰos 'tooth, peg'	dhëmb 'tooth'
*ǵʰ	dh	*ǵʰed-ioH 'I defecate'	dhjes 'I defecate'
	d (Note: Syllable-initial and followed by sibilant)	*ǵʰr̥sdʰi 'grain, barley'	drithë 'grain'

Reflexes of PIE velar plosives in Albanian
PIE	Albanian	PIE	Albanian
*k	k	*kágʰmi 'I catch, grasp'	kam 'I have'
	q	*kluH-i̯o- 'to weep'	qaj 'to weep, cry' (dial. kla(n)j)
*g	g	*h_{3}lígos 'sick'	ligë 'bad'
	gj	*h_{1}reug- 'to retch'	regj 'to tan hides'
*gʰ	g	*gʰórdʰos 'enclosure'	gardh 'fence'
	gj	*gʰédn-i̯e/o- 'to get'	gjej 'to find' (Old Alb. gjãnj)

Reflexes of PIE labiovelar plosives in Albanian
PIE	Albanian	PIE	Albanian
*kʷ	k	*kʷeh_{2}sleh_{2} 'cough'	kollë 'cough'
	s	*kʷélH- 'to turn'	sjell 'to fetch, bring'
	q	*kʷṓd	që 'that, which'
*gʷ	g	*gʷr̥H 'stone'	gur 'stone'
*gʷʰ	g	*dʰégʷʰ- 'to burn'	djeg 'to burn'
	z	*dʰogʷʰéi̯e- 'to ignite'	ndez 'to kindle, light a fire'

Reflexes of PIE *s in Albanian
PIE	Albanian	PIE	Albanian
*s	gj (Note: Initial)	*séḱstis 'six'	gjashtë 'six'
	h (Note: Between vowels)	*nosōm 'us' (gen.)	nahe 'us' (dat.)
	sh (Note: Between u/i and another vowel (ruki law))	*bʰreusos 'broken'	breshër 'hail'
	th (Note: Dissimilation with following s)	*suh_{1}s 'swine'	thi 'pig'
	∅	*h_{1}ésmi 'I am'	jam 'I am'
*-sd-	th	*gʷésdos 'leaf'	gjeth 'leaf'
*-sḱ-	h	*sḱi-eh_{2} 'shadow'	hije 'shadow'
*-sp-	f	*spélnom 'speech'	fjalë 'word'
*-st-	sht	*h_{2}osti 'bone'	asht 'bone'
*-su̯-	d	*su̯eíd-r̥- 'sweat'	dirsë 'sweat'

Reflexes of PIE sonorants in Albanian
PIE	Albanian	PIE	Albanian
*i̯	gj (Note: Before i, e, a)	*i̯éh_{3}s- 'to gird'	(n)gjesh 'I gird; squeeze, knead'
	j (Note: Before back vowels)	*i̯uH 'you' (nom.)	ju 'you (plural)'
	∅ (Note: Between vowels)	*trei̯es 'three' (masc.)	tre 'three'
*u̯	v	*u̯os-éi̯e- 'to dress'	vesh 'to wear, dress'
*m	m	*meh_{2}tr-eh_{2} 'maternal'	motër 'sister'
*n	n	*nōs 'we' (acc.)	ne 'we'
	nj	*eni-h_{1}ói-no 'that one'	një 'one' (Gheg njâ, njo, nji)
	∅ (Tosk) ~ nasal vowel (Gheg)	*pénkʷe 'five'	pesë 'five' (vs. Gheg pês)
	r (Tosk only)	*ǵʰeimen 'winter'	dimër 'winter' (vs. Gheg dimën)
*l	l	*h_{3}lígos 'sick'	ligë 'bad'
	ll	*kʷélH- 'turn'	sjell 'to fetch, bring'
*r	r	*repe/o 'take'	rjep 'peel'
	rr	*u̯rh_{1}ḗn 'sheep'	rrunjë 'yearling lamb'
*n̥	e	*h_{1}n̥men 'name'	emër 'name'
*m̥	e	*u̯iḱm̥ti 'twenty'	(një)zet 'twenty'
*l̥	li, il (Note: Before C clusters, i, j) / lu, ul	*u̯ĺ̥kʷos 'wolf'	ujk 'wolf' (dialectal ulk)
*r̥	ri, ir / ru, ur	*ǵʰr̥sdom 'grain, barley'	drithë 'grain'

Reflexes of PIE laryngeals in Albanian
PIE	Albanian	PIE	Albanian
*h_{1}	∅	*h_{1}ésmi 'I am'	jam 'to be'
*h_{2}	∅	*h_{2}r̥tḱos 'bear'	ari 'bear'
*h_{3}	∅	*h_{3}ónr̥ 'dream'	ëndërr 'dream'
*h_{4} (Note: disputed)	h	*h_{4}órǵʰi 'testicles'	herdhe 'testicles'

Reflexes of PIE vowels in Albanian
PIE	Albanian	PIE	Albanian
*i	i	*sínos 'bosom'	gji 'bosom, breast'
	e	*dwigʰeh_{2} 'twig'	degë 'branch'
*ī < *iH	i	*dih_{2}tis 'light'	ditë 'day'
*e	e	*pénkʷe 'five'	pesë 'five' (Gheg pês)
	je	*wétos 'year' (loc.)	vjet 'last year'
*ē	o	*ǵʰēsreh_{2} 'hand'	dorë 'hand'
*a	a	*bʰaḱeh_{2} 'bean'	bathë 'bean'
	e	*h_{2}élbʰit 'barley'	elb 'barley'
*o	a	*gʰórdʰos 'enclosure'	gardh 'fence'
*ō	e	*h₂oḱtōh₁tm̥ 'eight'	tetë 'eight'
*u	u	*súpnos 'sleep'	gjumë 'sleep'
*ū < *uH	y	*suHsos 'grandfather'	gjysh 'grandfather'
	i	*muh_{2}s 'mouse'	mi 'mouse'

Reflexes of PIE diphthongs in Albanian
PIE	Albanian	PIE	Albanian
*ey, *h1ey	i	*ǵʰeymōn-	dimër
*ay, *h2ey	e		
*oy, *h3ey	e	*stóygʰo-	shteg
*ew, *h1ew	a		
*aw, *h2ew	a	*h₂ewg-	agim
*ow, *h3ew	a, ve-		

== Standard Albanian ==
Since World War II, standard Albanian used in Albania has been based on the Tosk dialect. Kosovo and other areas where Albanian is official adopted the Tosk standard in 1969.

=== Elbasan-based standard ===
Until the early 20th century, Albanian writing developed in three main literary traditions: Gheg, Tosk, and Arbëreshë. Throughout this time, a Gheg subdialect spoken around Elbasan served as lingua franca among the Albanians, but was less prevalent in writing. The Congress of Manastir of Albanian writers held in 1908 recommended the use of the Elbasan subdialect for literary purposes and as a basis of a unified national language. While technically classified as a southern Gheg variety, the Elbasan speech is closer to Tosk in phonology and practically a hybrid between other Gheg subdialects and literary Tosk.

Between 1916 and 1918, the Albanian Literary Commission met in Shkodër under the leadership of Luigj Gurakuqi with the purpose of establishing a unified orthography for the language. The commission, made up of representatives from the north and south of Albania, reaffirmed the Elbasan subdialect as the basis of a national tongue. The rules published in 1917 defined spelling for the Elbasan variety for official purposes. The commission did not, however, discourage publications in one of the dialects, but rather laid a foundation for Gheg and Tosk to gradually converge into one.

When the Congress of Lushnje met in the aftermath of World War I to form a new Albanian government, the 1917 decisions of the Literary Commission were upheld. The Elbasan subdialect remained in use for administrative purposes and many new writers embraced it for creative writing. Gheg and Tosk continued to develop freely and interaction between the two dialects increased.

=== Tosk standard ===
At the end of World War II, however, the new communist regime radically imposed the use of the Tosk dialect in all facets of life in Albania: administration, education, and literature. Most Communist leaders were Tosks from the south. Standardisation was directed by the Albanian Institute of Linguistics and Literature of the Academy of Sciences of Albania. Two dictionaries were published in 1954: an Albanian language dictionary and a Russian–Albanian dictionary. New orthography rules were eventually published in 1967 and in 1973 with the Drejtshkrimi i gjuhës shqipe (Orthography of the Albanian Language).

Until 1968, Kosovo and other Albanian-speaking areas in Yugoslavia followed the 1917 standard based on the Elbasan dialect, though it was gradually infused with Gheg elements in an effort to develop a Kosovan language separate from communist Albania's Tosk-based standard. Albanian intellectuals in the former Yugoslavia consolidated the 1917 standard twice in the 1950s, culminating with a thorough codification of orthographic rules in 1964. The rules already provided for a balanced variety that accounted for both Gheg and Tosk dialects, but only lasted through 1968. Viewing divergences with Albania as a threat to their identity, Kosovars arbitrarily adopted the Tosk project that Tirana had published the year before. Although it was never intended to serve outside of Albania, the project became the "unified literary language" in 1972, when approved by a rubberstamp Orthography Congress. Only about 1 in 9 participants were from Kosovo. The Congress, held at Tirana, authorized the orthography rules that came out the following year, in 1973.

More recent dictionaries from the Albanian government are Fjalori Drejtshkrimor i Gjuhës Shqipe (1976) (Orthographic Dictionary of the Albanian Language) and Dictionary of Today's Albanian language (Fjalori i Gjuhës së Sotme Shqipe) (1980). Prior to World War II, dictionaries consulted by developers of the standard have included Lexikon tis Alvanikis glossis (Albanian: Fjalori i Gjuhës Shqipe (Kostandin Kristoforidhi, 1904), Fjalori i Bashkimit (1908), and Fjalori i Gazullit (1941).

=== Calls for reform ===
Since the fall of the communist regime, Albanian orthography has stirred heated debate among scholars, writers, and public opinion in Albania and Kosovo, with hardliners opposed to any changes in the orthography, moderates supporting varying degrees of reform, and radicals calling for a return to the Elbasan dialect. Criticism of Standard Albanian has centred on the exclusion of the 'me + participle' infinitive and the Gheg lexicon. Critics say that Standard Albanian disenfranchises and stigmatises Gheg speakers, affecting the quality of writing and impairing effective public communication. Supporters of the Tosk standard view the 1972 Congress as a milestone achievement in Albanian history and dismiss calls for reform as efforts to "divide the nation" or "create two languages." Moderates, who are especially prevalent in Kosovo, generally stress the need for a unified Albanian language, but believe that the 'me + participle' infinitive and Gheg words should be included. Proponents of the Elbasan dialect have been vocal, but have gathered little support in the public opinion. In general, those involved in the language debate come from diverse backgrounds and there is no significant correlation between one's political views, geographic origin, and position on Standard Albanian.

Many writers continue to write in the Elbasan dialect but other Gheg variants have found much more limited use in literature. Most publications adhere to a strict policy of not accepting submissions that are not written in Tosk. Some print media even translate direct speech, replacing the 'me + participle' infinitive with other verb forms and making other changes in grammar and word choice. Even authors who have published in the Elbasan dialect will frequently write in the Tosk standard.

In 2013, a group of academics for Albania and Kosovo proposed minor changes to the orthography. Hardline academics boycotted the initiative, while other reformers have viewed it as well-intentioned but flawed and superficial.

=== Education ===
Albanian is the medium of instruction in most Albanian schools. The literacy rate in Albania for the total population, age 9 or older, is about 99%. Elementary education is compulsory (grades 1–9), but most students continue at least until a secondary education. Students must pass graduation exams at the end of the 9th grade and at the end of the 12th grade in order to continue their education.

== Phonology ==
Standard Albanian has seven vowels and 29 consonants. Like English, Albanian has dental fricatives /θ/ (like the th in thin) and /ð/ (like the th in this), written as ⟨th⟩ and ⟨dh⟩, which are rare cross-linguistically.

Gheg uses long and nasal vowels, which are absent in Tosk, and the mid-central vowel ë is lost at the end of the word. The stress is fixed mainly on the last syllable. Gheg n (femën: compare English feminine) changes to r by rhotacism in Tosk (femër).

=== Consonants ===
		Labial	Dental/Alveolar		Post- alveolar	Palatal	Velar	Glottal
		Labial	plain	sibilant	Post- alveolar	Palatal	Velar	Glottal
Nasal		m	n			ɲ	(ŋ)	
Plosive/ Affricate	voiceless	p	t	ts	tʃ	c	k	
Plosive/ Affricate	voiced	b	d	dz	dʒ	ɟ	ɡ	
Fricative	voiceless	f	θ	s	ʃ			h
Fricative	voiced	v	ð	z	ʒ			
Approximant	plain		l			j		
Approximant	velar.		ɫ					
Vibrant	tap		ɾ					
Vibrant	trill		r					

IPA	Description	Written as	English approximation
m	Bilabial nasal	m	man
n	Alveolar nasal	n	not
ɲ	Palatal nasal	nj	~canyon
ŋ	Velar nasal	ng	bang
p	Voiceless bilabial plosive	p	spin
b	Voiced bilabial plosive	b	bat
t	Voiceless alveolar plosive	t	stand
d	Voiced alveolar plosive	d	debt
k	Voiceless velar plosive	k	car
ɡ	Voiced velar plosive	g	go
t͡s	Voiceless alveolar affricate	c	hats
d͡z	Voiced alveolar affricate	x	goods
t͡ʃ	Voiceless postalveolar affricate	ç	chin
d͡ʒ	Voiced postalveolar affricate	xh	jet
c	Voiceless palatal plosive	q	~acute
ɟ	Voiced palatal plosive	gj	~argue
f	Voiceless labiodental fricative	f	far
v	Voiced labiodental fricative	v	van
θ	Voiceless dental fricative	th	thin
ð	Voiced dental fricative	dh	then
s	Voiceless alveolar fricative	s	son
z	Voiced alveolar fricative	z	zip
ʃ	Voiceless postalveolar fricative	sh	show
ʒ	Voiced postalveolar fricative	zh	vision
h	Voiceless glottal fricative	h	hat
r	Alveolar trill	rr	Spanish perro
ɾ	Alveolar tap	r	~little
l	Alveolar lateral approximant	l	lean
ɫ	Velarized alveolar lateral approximant	ll	ball
j	Palatal approximant	j	yes

==== Notes ====
- The contrast between tapped r and trilled rr is almost the same as in Spanish or Armenian. However, in most of the dialects, as also in standard Albanian, the single r changes from an alveolar tap [ɾ] to a median alveolar approximant [ɹ].
- The palatal nasal /ɲ/ corresponds to the Spanish ñ and the French and Italian gn. It is pronounced as one sound, not a nasal plus a glide.
- The ll sound is a velarised lateral, close to English dark l.
- The letter ç is sometimes written ch due to technical limitations, in analogy to the other digraphs xh, sh, and zh. Usually it is written simply c or more rarely q with context resolving any ambiguities.
- The sounds spelled with q and gj show variation. They may be realized as palatal affricates [c͡ç, ɟ͡ʝ] or plosives [c, ɟ] among dialects. Some speakers merge them into the postalveolars ç and xh. This is especially common in Northern Gheg, but is increasingly the case in Tosk as well. Other speakers reduced them into /j/ in consonant clusters, such as in the word fjollë, which before standardisation was written as fqollë ( < Medieval Greek φακιολης).
- The ng can be pronounced as /ŋ/ in final position, otherwise it is an allophone of n before k and g.
- Before q and gj, n is always pronounced /ɲ/ but this is not reflected in the orthography.

=== Vowels ===
	Front		Central	Back
	unr.	rnd.	Central	Back
Close	i	y		u
Mid	e̞		ə	o̞
Open			ä	

IPA	Description	Written as	English approximation
i	Close front unrounded vowel	i	seed
y	Close front rounded vowel	y	~new
e̞	Mid front unrounded vowel	e	bear
ä	Open central unrounded vowel	a	spa
ə	Mid central vowel	ë	about
o̞	Mid back rounded vowel	o	more
u	Close back rounded vowel	u	pool

==== Notes ====
- /e̞, o̞/ range from close-mid [e, o] to open-mid [ɛ, ɔ] in free variation.
- /ə/ can also range to open-mid [ɜ] in the Northern Tosk dialect.

==== Schwa ====
The schwa in Albanian has a great degree of variability from extreme back to extreme front articulation. Although the Indo-European schwa (*ə or *-h₂-) was preserved in Albanian, in some cases it was lost, possibly when a stressed syllable preceded it. Until the standardisation of the modern Albanian alphabet, in which the schwa is spelled as ⟨ë⟩, as in the work of Gjon Buzuku in the 16th century, various vowel letters and digraphs were employed, including ⟨ae⟩ by Lekë Matrënga and ⟨é⟩ by Pjetër Bogdani in the late 16th and early 17th century. Within the borders of Albania, the phoneme is pronounced about the same in both the Tosk and the Gheg dialect due to the influence of standard Albanian. However, in the Gheg dialects spoken in the neighbouring Albanian-speaking areas of Kosovo and North Macedonia, the phoneme is still pronounced as back and rounded.

=== Stress ===
Stress in Albanian is on the penultimate syllable, unless the final syllable of a word is open and ends in either a, i or u, or is closed with the vowel not being a schwa, in which case the last syllable is stressed. Throughout inflections it is generally kept where it stands in the base form.

== Grammar ==
Albanian has a canonical word order of SVO (subject–verb–object) like English and many other Indo-European languages. Albanian nouns are categorised by gender (masculine, feminine and neuter) and inflected for number (singular and plural) and case. There are five declensions and six cases (nominative, accusative, genitive, dative, ablative, and vocative), although the vocative only occurs with a limited number of words (such as 'bir' ("son"), vocative case: biro, zog ("bird") vocative case: zogo), and the forms of the genitive and dative are identical (a genitive construction employs the prepositions i/e/të/së alongside dative morphemes). Some dialects also retain a locative case, which is not present in standard Albanian (e.g. "në malt" loc.sg.def). The cases apply to both definite and indefinite nouns, and there are numerous cases of syncretism.

The following shows the declension of mal (mountain), a noun in the masculine class which takes "i" in the definite singular:

	Indefinite		Definite	
	singular	plural	singular	plural
Nominative	një mal (a mountain)	male (several mountains)	mali (the mountain)	malet (the mountains)
Accusative	një mal	male	malin	malet
Genitive	i/e/të/së një mali	i/e/të/së maleve	i/e/të/së malit	i/e/të/së maleve
Dative	një mali	maleve	malit	maleve
Ablative	(prej) një mali	(prej) malesh	(prej) malit	(prej) maleve

The following shows the declension of the noun zog (bird), a noun in the masculine class which takes "u" in the definite singular:

	Indefinite		Definite	
	singular	plural	singular	plural
Nominative	një zog (a bird)	zogj (birds)	zogu (the bird)	zogjtë (the birds)
Accusative	një zog	zogj	zogun	zogjtë
Genitive	i/e/të/së një zogu	i/e/të/së zogjve	i/e/të/së zogut	i/e/të/së zogjve
Dative	një zogu	zogjve	zogut	zogjve
Ablative	(prej) një zogu	(prej) zogjsh	(prej) zogut	(prej) zogjve

The following table shows the declension of the noun vajzë (girl) in the feminine class:

	Indefinite		Definite	
	singular	plural	singular	plural
Nominative	një vajzë (a girl)	vajza (girls)	vajza (the girl)	vajzat (the girls)
Accusative	një vajzë	vajza	vajzën	vajzat
Genitive	i/e/të/së një vajze	i/e/të/së vajzave	i/e/të/së vajzës	i/e/të/së vajzave
Dative	një vajze	vajzave	vajzës	vajzave
Ablative	(prej) një vajze	(prej) vajzash	(prej) vajzës	(prej) vajzave

The definite article is placed after the noun as in many other Balkan languages, like in Romanian, Macedonian and Bulgarian.

- The definite article can be in the form of noun suffixes, which vary with gender and case.
  - For example, in singular nominative, masculine nouns add -i, or those ending in -g, -k, or -h take -u (to avoid palatalization):
    - mal (mountain) / mali (the mountain);
    - libër (book) / libri (the book);
    - zog (bird) / zogu (the bird).
  - Nouns in the feminine class take the suffix -(i/j)a:
    - veturë (car) / vetura (the car);
    - shtëpi (house) / shtëpia (the house);
    - lule (flower) / lulja (the flower).
- Nouns in the neuter class take -t.

Albanian has developed an analytical verbal structure in place of the earlier synthetic system, inherited from Proto-Indo-European. Its complex system of moods (six types) and tenses (three simple and five complex constructions) is distinctive among Balkan languages. There are two general types of conjugations.

Albanian has a series of verb forms called miratives or admiratives. These may express surprise on the part of the speaker, but may also have other functions, such as expressing irony, doubt, or reportedness. The Albanian use of admirative forms is unique in the Balkan context. In English, the expression of surprise can be rendered by 'oh, look!' or 'lookee there!'; the expression of doubt can be rendered by 'indeed!'; the expression of neutral reportedness can be rendered by 'apparently'.

- Ti flet shqip. "You speak Albanian." (indicative)
- Ti folke shqip! "You (surprisingly) speak Albanian!" (admirative)
- Rruga është e mbyllur. "The street is closed." (indicative)
- Rruga qenka e mbyllur. "(Apparently,) The street is closed." (admirative)

For more information on verb conjugation and on inflection of other parts of speech, see Albanian morphology.

=== Word order ===
Albanian word order is relatively free. To say 'Agim ate all the oranges' in Albanian, one may use any of the following orders, with slight pragmatic differences:

- SVO: Agimi i hëngri të gjithë portokallët.
- SOV: Agimi të gjithë portokallët i hëngri.
- OVS: Të gjithë portokallët i hëngri Agimi.
- OSV: Të gjithë portokallët Agimi i hëngri.
- VSO: I hëngri Agimi të gjithë portokallët.
- VOS: I hëngri të gjithë portokallët Agimi.

However, the most common order is subject–verb–object.

The verb can optionally occur in sentence-initial position, especially with verbs in the passive form (forma joveprore):

- Parashikohet një ndërprerje "An interruption is anticipated".

=== Negation ===
Verbal negation in Albanian is mood-dependent, a trait shared with some fellow Indo-European languages such as Greek.

In indicative, conditional, or admirative sentences, negation is expressed by the particles nuk or s' in front of the verb, for example:

- Toni nuk flet anglisht "Tony does not speak English";
- Toni s'flet anglisht "Tony doesn't speak English";
- Nuk e di "I do not know";
- S'e di "I don't know".

Subjunctive, imperative, optative, or non-finite forms of verbs are negated with the particle mos:

- Mos harro "Do not forget!".

== Numerals ==
një—one	tetëmbëdhjetë—eighteen
dy—two	nëntëmbëdhjetë—nineteen
tri/tre—three	njëzet—twenty
katër—four	njëzet e një—twenty-one
pesë—five	njëzet e dy—twenty-two
gjashtë—six	tridhjetë—thirty
shtatë—seven	dyzet/katërdhjetë—forty
tetë—eight	pesëdhjetë—fifty
nëntë—nine	gjashtëdhjetë—sixty
dhjetë—ten	shtatëdhjetë—seventy
njëmbëdhjetë—eleven	tetëdhjetë—eighty
dymbëdhjetë—twelve	nëntëdhjetë—ninety
trembëdhjetë—thirteen	njëqind—one hundred
katërmbëdhjetë—fourteen	pesëqind—five hundred
pesëmbëdhjetë—fifteen	një mijë—one thousand
gjashtëmbëdhjetë—sixteen	një milion—one million
shtatëmbëdhjetë—seventeen	një miliard—one billion

=== Notes ===
- In certain dialects, numerals with an extra syllable may undergo metrical syncope. For example, pesëmbëdhjetë becomes pesëmet.

=== Vigesimal system ===
Beside the Indo-European decimal numeration, there are also remnants of the vigesimal system, as njëzet 'twenty' and dyzet 'forty'. The Arbëreshë in Italy and Arvanites in Greece may still use trezet 'sixty' and katërzet 'eighty'. Albanian is the only Balkan language that has preserved the Pre-Indo-European vigesimal system.

== Lexicon ==
Albanian is known within historical linguistics as a case of a language which, although surviving through many periods of foreign rule and multilingualism, saw a "disproportionately high" influx of loans from other languages augmenting and replacing much of its original vocabulary. Of all the foreign influences in Albanian, the deepest reaching and most impactful was the absorption of loans from Latin in the Classical period and its Romance successors afterward. Scholars have estimated a great number of Latin loanwords in Albanian, some even claiming 60% of the Albanian vocabulary so that Albanian had once falsely been classified as a Romance language.

Major work in reconstructing Proto-Albanian has been done with the help of knowledge of the original forms of loans from Ancient Greek, Latin and Slavic. While Ancient Greek loanwords are scarce, the Latin loanwords are of extreme importance in phonology. The presence of loanwords from more well-studied languages from time periods before Albanian was attested, reaching deep back into the Classical Era, has been of great use in phonological reconstructions for earlier ancient and medieval forms of Albanian. Some words in the core vocabulary of Albanian have no known etymology linking them to Proto-Indo-European or any known source language, and as of 2018 are thus tentatively attributed to an unknown, unattested, pre-Indo-European substrate language; some words among these include zemër (heart) and hekur (iron). Some among these putative pre-IE words are thought to be related to putative pre-IE substrate words in neighboring Indo-European languages, such as lule (flower), which has been tentatively linked to Latin lilia and Greek leirion.

Lexical distance of Albanian to other languages in a lexicostatistical analysis by Ukrainian linguist Tyshchenko shows the following results (the lower figure, the higher similarity): 49% Slovenian, 53% Romanian, 56% Greek, 82% French, 86% Macedonian, 86% Bulgarian.

=== Cognates with Illyrian ===
Illyrian term	description	Corresponding Albanian term
Andena, Andes, Andio, Antis	Personal Illyrian names based on a root-word and- or ant-, found in both the southern and the Dalmatian-Pannonian (including modern Bosnia and Herzegovina) onomastic provinces	Alb. andë (northern Albanian dialect, or Gheg) and ëndë (southern Albanian dialect or Tosk) "appetite, pleasure, desire, wish"
aran	"field"	Alb. arë; plural ara
Ardiaioi/Ardiaei	name of an Illyrian people	connected to hardhi "vine-branch, grape-vine", with a sense development similar to Germanic *stamniz, meaning both stem, tree stalk and tribe, lineage.
Bilia	"daughter"	Alb. bijë, dial. bilë
Bindo/Bindus	an Illyrian deity, cf. Bihać, Bosnia and Herzegovina	Alb. bind "to convince" or "to make believe", përbindësh "monster"
*bounon	"hut, cottage"	Alb bun
*brisa	"husk of grapes"	Alb bërsí "lees, dregs; mash" ( < PA *brutiā)
Barba-	"swamp", toponym from Metubarbis	Alb. bërrakë "swampy soil"
Daesitiates	name of an Illyrian people	Alb. dash "ram", corresponding contextually with south Slavonic dasa "ace", which might represent a borrowing and adaptation from Illyrian or even Proto-Albanian.
*mal	"mountain"	Alb mal "mountain"
*bardi	"white"	Alb bardhë "white"
*drakoina	"supper"	Alb. darke, dreke "supper, dinner"
*drenis	"deer"	Alb. indef. dre, def. dreni "deer"
*delme	"sheep"	Alb. dele, Gheg delme "sheep"
*dard	"pear"	Alb. dardhë "pear"
sīca	"dagger"	Alb indef. thikë or def. thika "knife"
Ulc-	"wolf" (pln. Ulcinium)	Alb ujk "wolf", ulk (Northern Dialect)
*loúgeon	"pool"	Alb lag, legen "to wet, soak, bathe, wash" ( < PA * lauga), lëgatë "pool" ( < PA *leugatâ), lakshte "dew" ( < PA laugista)
*mag-	"great"	Alb. madh "big, great"
*mantía	"bramblebush"	Old and dial. Alb mandë "berry, mulberry" (mod. Alb mën, man)
rhinos	"fog, mist"	Old Alb ren "cloud" (mod. Alb re, rê) ( < PA *rina)
Vendum	"place"	Proto-Alb. wen-ta (Mod. Alb. vend)

=== Early linguistic influences ===
The earliest loanwords attested in Albanian come from Doric Greek, whereas the strongest influence came from Latin. Some scholars argue that Albanian originated from an area located east of its present geographic spread due to the several common lexical items found between the Albanian and Romanian languages. However it does not necessarily define the genealogical history of Albanian language, and it does not exclude the possibility of Proto-Albanian presence in both Illyrian and Thracian territory.

The period during which Proto-Albanian and Latin interacted was protracted, lasting from the 2nd century BC to the 5th century AD. Over this period, the lexical borrowings can be roughly divided into three layers, the second of which is the largest. The first and smallest occurred at the time of less significant interaction. The final period, probably preceding the Slavic or Germanic invasions, also has a notably smaller number of borrowings. Each layer is characterised by a different treatment of most vowels: the first layer follows the evolution of Early Proto-Albanian into Albanian; while later layers reflect vowel changes endemic to Late Latin (and presumably Proto-Romance). Other formative changes include the syncretism of several noun case endings, especially in the plural, as well as a large-scale palatalisation.

A brief period followed, between the 7th and the 9th centuries, that was marked by heavy borrowings from South Slavic, some of which predate the "o-a" shift common to the modern forms of this language group.

==== Early Greek loans ====
There are some 30 Ancient Greek loanwords in Proto-Albanian. Many of these reflect a dialect which voiced its aspirants, as did the Macedonian dialect. Other loanwords are Doric; these words mainly refer to commodity items and trade goods and probably came through trade with a now-extinct intermediary.

- drapër; "sickle" < (Northwest Greek) drápanon
- bletë; "hive, bee" < Attic mélitta "bee" (vs. Ionic mélissa).
- kumbull; "plum" < kokkúmelon
- lakër; "cabbage, green vegetables" < lákhanon "green; vegetable"
- lëpjetë; "orach, dock" < lápathon
- lyej; "to smear, to oil"< Proto-Albanian *elaiwanja < *elaiwa (olive oil) < Greek elaion
- mokër; "millstone" < (Northwest) mākhaná "device, instrument"
- mollë; "apple" < mēlon "fruit"
- pëllëmbë; "palm of the hand" < palámā
- pjepër; "melon" < pépōn
- presh; "leek" < práson
- trumzë; "thyme" < (Northwest) thýmbrā, thrýmbrē
- pellg; "pond, pool" < pélagos "high sea"

According to Huld (1986), the following come from a Greek dialect without any significant attestation called "Makedonian" because it was akin to the native idiom of the Greek-speaking population in the Argead kingdom:

- llërë; "elbow" < *ὠlénā
- brukë; "tamarisk" < *mīrýkhā
- mëllagë; 'mallow' < *malákhā (with the reflex of /ɡ/ for Greek <χ> indicating a dialectal voicing of the what came as an aspirate stop from Greek)
- maraj "fennel" < *márathrion (cf Romanian mărar(iu), Ionic márathron; with the Albanian simplification of -dri̯- to -j- reflecting that of earlier *udri̯om to ujë "water")

==== Latin influence ====
Scholars have estimated a great number of Latin loanwords in Albanian, some even claiming 60% of the Albanian vocabulary. They include many frequently used core vocabulary items, including shumë ("very", from Latin summus), pak ("few", Latin paucus), ngushtë ("narrow", Latin angustus), pemë ("tree", Latin poma), vij ("to come", Latin veniō), rërë ("sand", Latin arena), drejt ("straight", Latin directus), kafshë ("beast", Latin causa, meaning "thing"), and larg ("far away", Latin largus).

Jernej Kopitar (1780–1844) was the first to note Latin's influence on Albanian and claimed "the Latin loanwords in the Albanian language had the pronunciation of the time of Emperor Augustus". Kopitar gave examples such as Albanian qiqer 'chickpea' from Latin cicer, qytet 'city, town' from civitas, peshk 'fish' from piscis, and shigjetë 'arrow' from sagitta. The hard pronunciations of Latin ⟨c⟩ and ⟨g⟩ are retained as palatal and velar stops in the Albanian loanwords. Gustav Meyer (1888) and Wilhelm Meyer-Lübke (1914) later corroborated this. Meyer noted the similarity between the Albanian verbs shqipoj "to speak clearly, enunciate" and shqiptoj "to pronounce, articulate" and the Latin word excipiō (meaning "to welcome"). Therefore, he believed that the word Shqiptar "Albanian person" was derived from shqipoj, which in turn was derived from the Latin word excipere. Johann Georg von Hahn, an Austrian linguist, had proposed the same hypothesis in 1854.

Eqrem Çabej also noticed, among other things, the archaic Latin elements in Albanian:

1. Latin /au/ becomes Albanian /a/ in the earliest loanwords: aurum → ar 'gold'; gaudium → gaz 'joy'; laurus → lar 'laurel'. Latin /au/ is retained in later loans, but is altered in a way similar to Greek: causa 'thing' → kafshë 'thing; beast, brute'; laud → lavd.
2. Latin /oː/ becomes Albanian /e/ in the oldest Latin loans: pōmus → pemë 'fruit tree'; hōra → herë 'time, instance'. An analogous mutation occurred from Proto-Indo-European to Albanian; PIE *nōs became Albanian ne 'we', PIE *oḱtṓw + suffix -ti- became Albanian tetë 'eight', etc.
3. Latin unstressed internal and initial syllables become lost in Albanian: cubitus → kub 'elbow'; medicus → mjek 'physician'; palūdem 'swamp' → Vulgar Latin *padūle → pyll 'forest'. An analogous mutation occurred from Proto-Indo-European to Albanian. In contrast, in later Latin loanwords, the internal syllable is retained: paganus → pagan; plaga → plagë 'wound', etc.
4. Latin /tj/, /dj/, /kj/ palatalized to Albanian /s/, /z/, /c/: vitium → ves 'vice; worries'; ratiōnem → arsye 'reason'; radius → rreze 'ray; spoke'; faciēs → faqe 'face, cheek'; socius → shok 'mate, comrade', shoq 'husband', etc. In turn, Latin /s/ was altered to /ʃ/ in Albanian.

Haralambie Mihăescu demonstrated that:

- Some 85 Latin words have survived in Albanian but not (as inherited) in any Romance language. A few examples include Late Latin celsydri → dial. kulshedër → kuçedër 'hydra', hībernus → vërri 'winter pasture', sarcinārius 'used for packing, loading' → shelqëror 'forked peg, grapnel, forked hanger', sōlānum 'nightshade', lit. 'sun plant' → shullë(r) 'sunny place out of the wind, sunbathed area', splēnēticus → shpretkë 'spleen', trifurcus → tërfurk 'pitchfork'.
- 151 Albanian words of Latin origin were not inherited in Romanian. A few examples include Latin amīcus → Albanian mik 'friend', inimīcus → armik 'foe, enemy', ratiōnem → arsye, benedīcere → bekoj, bubulcus 'ploughman, herdsman' → bulk, bujk 'peasant', calicis → qelq 'drinking glass', castellum → kështjellë 'castle', centum → qind 'hundred', gallus → gjel 'rooster', iunctūra → gjymtyrë 'limb; joint', medicus → mjek 'doctor', retem → rrjetë 'net', spērāre → dial. shp(ë)rej, shpresoj 'to hope', pres 'to await', voluntās (voluntātis) → vullnet 'will; volunteer'.
- Some Albanian church terminology has phonetic features which demonstrate their very early borrowing from Latin. A few examples include Albanian bekoj 'to bless' from benedīcere, engjëll 'angel' from angelus, kishë 'church' from ecclēsia, i krishterë 'Christian' from christiānus, kryq 'cross' from crux (crucis), (obsolete) lter 'altar' from Latin altārium, mallkoj 'to curse' from maledīcere, meshë 'mass' from missa, murg 'monk' from monachus, peshkëp 'bishop' from episcopus, and ungjill 'gospel' from ēvangelium.

Other authors have detected Latin loanwords in Albanian that could come from Latin before the palatalization of velar consonants, as early as the 2nd or 3rd century. For example, Albanian qingël(ë) 'saddle girth; dwarf elder' from Latin cingula and Albanian e vjetër 'old, aged; former' from vjet but influenced by Latin veteris. The Romance languages inherited these words from Vulgar Latin: cingula became (via *clinga) Romanian chingă 'girdle; saddle girth', and veterānus became Romanian bătrân 'old'.

Albanian, Basque, and the surviving Celtic languages such as Breton and Welsh are the non-Romance languages today that have this sort of extensive Latin element dating from ancient Roman times, which has undergone the sound changes associated with the languages. Other languages in or near the former Roman area either came on the scene later (Turkish, the Slavic languages, Arabic) or borrowed little from Latin despite coexisting with it (Greek, German), although German does have a few such ancient Latin loanwords (Fenster 'window', Käse 'cheese').

Romanian scholars such as Vatasescu and Mihaescu, using lexical analysis of the Albanian language, have concluded that Albanian was heavily influenced by an extinct Romance language that was distinct from both Romanian and Dalmatian. Because the Latin words common to only Romanian and Albanian are significantly fewer in number than those that are common to only Albanian and Western Romance, Mihaescu argues that the Albanian language evolved in a region with much greater contact with Western Romance regions than with Romanian-speaking regions, and located this region in present-day Albania, Kosovo and Western Macedonia, spanning east to Bitola and Pristina.

==== Slavic influence ====
After the Slavs arrived in the Balkans, the Slavic languages became an additional source of loanwords. Contact between Albanian with the Slavic languages lasted very intensively for almost four centuries, and continued even in the late Middle Ages. Slavic loanwords in Albanian constitute a less studied area in literature. Per Vladimir Orel (1998), there are about 556 Slavic loanwords in Albanian.

==== Turkish influence ====
The rise of the Ottoman Empire meant an influx of Turkish words; this also entailed the borrowing of Persian and Arabic words through Turkish. Some Turkish personal names, such as Altin, are common. There are some loanwords from Modern Greek, especially in the south of Albania. Many borrowed words have been replaced by words with Albanian roots or modern Latinised (international) words. According to calculations mentioned by Emanuele Banfi (1985), the total number of Turkish loanwords in Albanian is about two thousand. However, when taking into account obsolete and rare words, and restricted dialectalisms, their number is considerably larger.

==== Gothic ====
Albanian is also known to possess a small set of loans from Gothic, with early inquiry into the matter done by Norbert Jokl and Sigmund Feist, though such loans had been claimed earlier in the 19th century by early linguists such as Gustav Meyer. Many words claimed as Gothic have now been attributed to other origins by later linguists of Albanian (fat and tufë, though used for major claims by Huld in 1994, are now attributed to Latin, for example), or may instead be native to Albanian, inherited from Proto-Indo-European. Today, it is accepted that there are a few words from Gothic in Albanian, but for the most part they are scanty because the Goths had few contacts with Balkan peoples.

Martin Huld defends the significance of the admittedly sparse Gothic loans for Albanian studies, however, arguing that Gothic is the only clearly post-Roman and "pre-Ottoman" language after Latin with a notable influence on the Albanian lexicon (the influence of Slavic languages is both pre-Ottoman and Ottoman). He argues that Gothic words in Albanian are attributable to the late fourth and early fifth centuries during the invasions of various Gothic speaking groups of the Balkans under Alaric, Odoacer, and Theodoric. He argues that Albanian Gothicisms bear evidence for the ordering of developments within Proto-Albanian at this time: for example, he argues Proto-Albanian at this stage had already shifted /uː/ to /y/ as Gothic words with /uː/ reflect with /u/ in Albanian, not /y/ as seen in most Latin and ancient Greek loans, but had not yet experienced the shift of /t͡s/ to /θ/, since loans from Gothic words with /θ/ replace /θ/ with /t/ or another close sound.

Notable words that continue to be attributed to Gothic in Albanian by multiple modern sources include:

- tirk "felt gaiters, white felt" (cf Romanian tureac "top of boot") < Gothic *θiuh-brōks- or *θiuhbrōkeis, cf Old High German theobrach "gaiters"
- shkumë "foam" < Gothic *skūm-, perhaps via an intermediary in a Romance *scuma (cf. Romanian spumă)
- gardh "fence, garden" is either considered a native Albanian word that was loaned into Romanian as gard
- zverk "nape, back of neck" < Gothic *swairhs; the "difficult" word having various otherwise been attributed (with phonological issues) to Celtic, Greek or native development.
- horr "villain, scoundrel" and horre "whore" < Gothic *hors "adulterer, cf Old Norse hóra "whore"
- punjashë "purse", diminutive of punjë < Gothic puggs "purse" (cf. Romanian pungă)

==== Patterns in loaning ====
Although Albanian is characterised by the absorption of many loans, even, in the case of Latin, reaching deep into the core vocabulary, certain semantic fields nevertheless remained more resistant. Terms pertaining to social organisation are often preserved, though not those pertaining to political organisation, while those pertaining to trade are all loaned or innovated.

Hydronyms present a complicated picture; the term for "sea" (det) is native and an "Albano-Germanic" innovation referring to the concept of depth, but a large amount of maritime vocabulary is loaned. Words referring to large streams and their banks tend to be loans, but lumë ("river") is native, as is rrymë (the flow of water). Words for smaller streams and stagnant pools of water are more often native, but the word for "pond", pellg is in fact a semantically shifted descendant of the old Greek word for "high sea", suggesting a change in location after Greek contact. Albanian has maintained since Proto-Indo-European a specific term referring to a riverside forest (gjazë), as well as its words for marshes. Albanian has maintained native terms for "whirlpool", "water pit" and (aquatic) "deep place", leading Orel to speculate that the Albanian Urheimat likely had an excess of dangerous whirlpools and depths.

Regarding forests, words for most conifers and shrubs are native, as are the terms for "alder", "elm", "oak", "beech", and "linden", while "ash", "chestnut", "birch", "maple", "poplar", and "willow" are loans.

The original kinship terminology of Indo-European was radically reshaped; changes included a shift from "mother" to "sister", and were so thorough that only three terms retained their original function, the words for "son-in-law", "mother-in-law" and "father-in-law". All the words for second-degree blood kinship, including "aunt", "uncle", "nephew", "niece", and terms for grandchildren, are ancient loans from Latin.

The Proto-Albanians appear to have been cattle breeders given the vastness of preserved native vocabulary pertaining to cow breeding, milking and so forth, while words pertaining to dogs tend to be loaned. Many words concerning horses are preserved, but the word for horse itself is a Latin loan.

== Sample text ==
Article 1 of the Universal Declaration of Human Rights in Albanian:

Të gjithë njerëzit lindin të lirë dhe të barabartë në dinjitet dhe në të drejta. Ata kanë arsye dhe ndërgjegje dhe duhet të sillen ndaj njëri tjetrit me frymë vëllazërimi.

Article 1 of the Universal Declaration of Human Rights in English:

All human beings are born free and equal in dignity and rights. They are endowed with reason and conscience and should act towards one another in a spirit of brotherhood.

== See also ==
- Abetare
- Arbëresh language
- Arvanitika
- Gheg Albanian
- Illyrian language
- IPA/Albanian
- Messapic language
- Thraco-Illyrian
- Tosk Albanian

== Bibliography ==
- Ajeti, Idriz (1968). "La présence de l'albanais dans les parlers des populations slaves de la Péninsule balkanique à la lumière de la langue et de la toponymie". Studia Albanica. 2: 131–136.
- Ajeti, Idriz (1972). "Për historinë e marrëdhënieve të hershme gjuhësore shqiptare-sllave". Studime Filologjike. 4: 83–94. (reprint in Gjurmime albanologjike – Seria e shkencave filologjike II – 1972. Pristina: 1974, pp. 33–44).
- Arapi, Inna (2010). Der Gebrauch von Infinitiv nagger und Konjunktiv im Altalbanischen mit Ausblick auf das Rumänische. Hamburg: Kovač.
- Banfi, Emanuele (1985). Linguistica balcanica. Bologna: Zanichelli.
- Banfi, Emanuele (1991). Storia linguistica del sud-est europeo: Crisi della Romània balcanica tra alto e basso medioevo. Milan: Franco Angeli.
- Beekes, Robert Stephen Paul (2011). de Vaan, Michiel (ed.). Comparative Indo-European Linguistics: An Introduction (2nd ed.). John Benjamins Publishing Company. ISBN 978-90-272-1185-9.
- Bihiku, Koço (1980). A history of Albanian literature. Tirana: 8 Nëntori Publishing House. OCLC 9133663.
- Bonnet, Guillaume (1998). Les mots latins de l'albanais. Paris: L'Harmattan. ISBN 978-2-7384-6034-9.
- Bopp, Franz (1855). Über das Albanesische in seinen verwandtschaftlichen Beziehungen. Berlin: J. A. Stargardt.
- Boretzky, Norbert (1975). Phonologie und Morphologie der albanischen Turzismen. Der türkische Einfluss auf das Albanische. Vol. 1. Wiesbaden: Otto Harrassowitz.
- Boretzky, Norbert (1975). Wörterbuch der albanischen Turzismen. Der türkische Einfluss auf das Albanische. Vol. 2. Wiesbaden: Otto Harrassowitz.
- Buchholz, Oda; Fiedler, Wilfried (1987). Albanische Grammatik (in German). Leipzig: VEB Verlag Enzyklopädie. ISBN 978-3-324-00025-3.
- Çabej, Eqrem (1962). "Disa probleme themelore të historisë së vjetër të gjuhës shqipe". Buletin i Universitetit Shtetëror të Tiranës. Seria e Shkencave Shoqërore. 4: 117–148. (In German Studia Albanica 1 (1964))
- Çabej, Eqrem (1962). "Zur Charakteristik der lateinischen Lehnwörter im Albanischen". Revue roumaine de linguistique (in German). 7 (1): 161–199.
  - Çabej, Eqrem (1974). "Karakteristikat e huazimeve latine të gjuhës shqipe". Studime Filologjike (in Albanian). 2: 14–51.
- Çabej, Eqrem. "Rreth disa çështjeve të historisë së gjuhës shqipe", Buletin i Universitetit Shtetëror të Tiranës. Seria e Shkencave Shoqërore 3 (1963): 69–101. (In Romanian Studii și cercetări lingvistiche 4 (1954))
- Çabej, Eqrem. "Mbi disa rregulla të fonetikës historike të shqipes", Studime Filologjike 2 (1970): 77–95 (In German "Über einige Lautregeln des Albanischen", Die Sprache 18 (1972): 132–54)
- Çabej, Eqrem (1972). "L'ancien nom national des albanais". Studia Albanica. 1: 1–40.
- Çabej, Eqrem (1972). "Problemi i vendit të formimit të gjuhës shqipe". Studime Filologjike. 4: 3–27.
- Çabej, Eqrem. Studime etimologjike në fushë të shqipes. 7 vols. Tirana: Akademia et Shkencave e Republikës Popullore të Shqipërisë, Instituti i Gjuhësisë dhe i Letërsisë, 1976–2014.
- Camaj, Martin (1966). Albanische Wortbildung. Wiesbaden: Otto Harrassowitz.
- Camaj, Martin (1984). Albanian Grammar. Translated by Fox, Leonard. Wiesbaden: Otto Harrassowitz.
- Camarda, Demetrio (1864). Saggio di grammatologia comparata sulla lingua albanese. Livorno: Successore di Egisto Vignozzi.
- Camarda, Demetrio (1866). Appendice al saggio di grammatologia comparata sulla lingua albanese. Prato.
- Campbell, George L., ed. (2000). "Albanian". Compendium of the World's Languages. Vol. 1 (2nd ed.). London: Routledge. pp. 50–57.
- Cimochowski, Wacław (1950). "Recherches sur l'histoire du sandhi dans la langue albanaise". Lingua Posnaniensis. 2: 220–255.
- Cimochowski, Wacław (1960). "Des recherches sur la toponomastique de l'Albanie". Lingua Posnaniensis. 8: 133–145.
- Cimochowski, Wacław (1973). "Pozicioni gjuhësor i ilirishtes ballkanike në rrethin e gjuhëve indoevropiane". Studime Filologjike. 2.
- Coretta, Stefano; Riverin-Coutlée, Josiane; Kapia, Enkeleida; Nichols, Stephen (2022). "Northern Tosk Albanian". Journal of the International Phonetic Association. 53 (3): 1–23. doi:10.1017/S0025100322000044. hdl:20.500.11820/ebce2ea3-f955-4fa5-9178-e1626fbae15f.
- Demiraj, Bardhyl (1997). Albanische Etymologien: Untersuchungen zum albanischen Erbwortschatz. Amsterdam: Rodopi. ISBN 90-420-0161-5.
- Demiraj, Shaban (1998). "Albanian". In Giacalone Ramat, Anna; Ramat, Paolo (eds.). The Indo-European Languages. London: Routledge. pp. 480–501. ISBN 978-0-415-06449-1.
- Demiraj, Shaban (1986). Gramatikë historike e gjuhës shqipe. Tirana: 8 Nëntori.
- Demiraj, Shaban (1988). Gjuha shqipe dhe historia e saj. Tirana: Shtëpia botuese e librit universitar.
- Demiraj, Shaban (1996). Fonologjia historike e gjuhës shqipe. Tirana: Akademia e Shkencave e Shqiperise, Instituti i Gjuhesise dhe i Letersise. OCLC 39182610.
- Demiraj, Shaban (1999). Prejardhja e shqiptarëve në dritën e dëshmive të gjuhës shqipe. Tirana: Shkenca. ISBN 978-99927-654-7-0.
- Demiraj, Shaban (2006). The origin of the Albanians: linguistically investigated. Tirana: Academy of Sciences of Albania. ISBN 978-99943-817-1-5.
- Demiraj, B.; Esposito, A. (2009). "Albanian". In Brown, Keith; Ogilvie, Sarah (eds.). Concise Encyclopedia of Languages of the World. Elsevier. ISBN 978-0-08-087774-7.
- Demiraj, Bardhyl (2010). "Gli insediamenti degli albanesi nell'alto medioevo" (PDF). In Belluscio, Gianni; Mendicino, Antonino (eds.). Scritti in onore di Eric Pratt Hamp per il suo 90 compleanno. Rende: Università della Calabria. pp. 73–83.
- Demiraj, Bardhyl (2012). "La Maledizione dell'Epirota (1483)". Res Albanicae. I (1). Palermo: 133–149.
- De Simone, Carlo (1986). "Gli illiri del Sud. Tentativo di una definizione". Iliria. 1.
- Desnickaja, Agnija (1968). Albanskij jazyk i ego dialekty. Leningrad: Nauka.
- Desnickaja, Agnija (1973). "Language Interferences and Historical Dialectology". Linguistics. 113: 41–57.
- Desnickaja, Agnija (1990). Osnovy balkanskogo jazykoznanija. Leningrad: Nauka.
- de Vaan, Michiel (2018). "The Phonology of Albanian". Handbook of Comparative and Historical Indo-European Linguistics. Vol. 3. Berlin: De Gruyter Mouton. pp. 1732–1749.
- Domi, Mahir (1974). "Prapashtesa ilire dhe shqipe, përkime dhe paralelizma". Studime Filologjike. 4.
- Domi, Mahir (1975). "Considérations sur les traits communs ou parallèles de l'albanais avec les autres langues balkaniques et sur leur étude". Studia Albanica. 1.
- Fortson, Benjamin Wynn IV (2010). Indo-European Language and Culture: An Introduction (2nd ed.). Wiley-Blackwell. ISBN 978-1-4443-5968-8.
- Friedman, Victor A. (2020). "The Balkans". In Adamou, Evangelia; Matras, Yaron (eds.). The Routledge Handbook of Language Contact. Routledge Handbooks in Linguistics. Routledge. pp. 385–403. ISBN 978-1-351-10914-7.
- Genesin, Monica (1998). "Albanian". In Price, Glanville (ed.). Encyclopedia of the Languages of Europe. Oxford: Blackwell. pp. 4–8.
- Gjinari, Jorgji (1968). "Për historinë e dialekteve të gjuhës shqipe". Studime Filologjike. 4.
- Gjinari, Jorgji (1969). "Mbi vazhdimësinë e ilirishtes në gjuhën shqipe". Studime Filologjike. 3.
- Gjinari, Jorgji (1970). Dialektologjia shqiptare. Pristina: Universiteti.
- Gjinari, Jorgji (1976). "Struktura dialektore e shqipes e parë në lidhje me historinë e popullit". Studime Filologjike. 3.
- Gjinari, Jorgji (1982). "Dëshmi të historisë së gjuhës shqipe për kohën dhe vendin e formimit të popullit shqiptar". Studime Filologjike. 3.
- Gjinari, Jorgji; Beci, Bahri; Shkurtaj, Gjovalin; Gosturani, Xheladin (2007). Atlasi dialektologjik i gjuhës shqipe. Vol. 1. Naples: Università degli Studi di Napoli L'Orientali.
- Hamp, Eric P. (1963). "The Position of Albanian, Ancient IE dialects". In Birnbaum, Henrik; Puhvel, Jaan (eds.). Proceedings of the Conference on IE linguistics held at the University of California, Los Angeles, April 25–27, 1963.
- Hamp, Eric; Adams, Douglas (August 2013). "The Expansion of the Indo-European Languages: An Indo-Europeanist's Evolving View" (PDF). Sino-Platonic Papers. 239.
- Hamp, Eric P. (1994). "Albanian". In Asher, R. E. (ed.). Encyclopedia of Language and Linguistics. Vol. 1. Oxford: Pergamon. pp. 65–67.
- Huld, Martin E. (1984). Basic Albanian Etymologies. Columbus, OH: Slavica Publishers.
- Hyllested, Adam; Joseph, Brian (2022). "Albanian". The Indo-European Language Family. Cambridge University Press. pp. 223–245. doi:10.1017/9781108758666.013. ISBN 978-1-108-49979-8.
- Imami, Petrit (2011). Origjina e fjalëve të gjuhës shqipe (in Albanian). Prishtinë. Archived from the original on 12 January 2024.
- Ismajli, Rexhep (2015). Eqrem Basha (ed.). Studime për historinë e shqipes në kontekst ballkanik [Studies on the History of Albanian in the Balkan context] (in Albanian). Prishtinë: Kosova Academy of Sciences and Arts, special editions CLII, Section of Linguistics and Literature.
- Katicic, Radoslav (2012). Ancient Languages of the Balkans. Walter de Gruyter. ISBN 978-3-11-156887-4.
- Kocaqi, Altin (2013). Dokumente historiko-gjuhësore: vëndi i shqipes ndër gjuhët evropiane. Albania: Marin Barleti. ISBN 978-99956-04-70-7.
- Kopitar, Jernej K. (1829). "Albanische, walachische und bulgarische Sprache". Jahrbücher der Literatur (Wien). 46: 59–106.
- Kretschmer, Paul (1896). Einleitung in die Geschichte der griechischen Sprache. Göttingen: Vandenhoeck und Ruprecht.
- Kretschmer, Paul (1935). "Sprachliche Vorgeschichte des Balkans". Revue internationale des études balkaniques. 2 (1): 41–48.
- Lloshi, Xhevat (1994). Reiter, Norbert; Hinrichs, Uwe; van Leeuwen-Turnovcova, Jirina (eds.). Substandard Albanian and Its Relation to Standard Albanian. Sprachlicher Standard und Substandard in Südosteuropa und Osteuropa: Beiträge zum Symposium vom 12.-16. Oktober 1992 in Berlin. Berlin: Otto Harrassowitz. pp. 184–194.
- Lloshi, Xhevat (1999). "Albanian". In Hinrichs, Uwe (ed.). Handbuch der Südosteuropa-Linguistik. Wiesbaden: Otto Harrassowitz. pp. 277–299.
- Lloshi, Xhevat (2008). Rreth alfabetit të shqipes: me rastin e 100-vjetorit të Kongresit të Manastirit. Skopje–Pristina–Tirana: Logos-A. ISBN 978-9989-58-268-4.
- Lambertz, Maximilian. Lehrgang des Albanischen. 3 vols., vol. 1: Albanisch-deutsches Wörterbuch; vol. 2: Albanische Chrestomathie; vol. 3: Grammatik der albanischen Sprache. Berlin: Deutscher Verlag der Wissenschaften 1954; Berlin 1955; Halle an der Saale 1959.
- Mallory, J.P.; Adams, D. Q. (1997). "Albanian language". Encyclopedia of Indo-European Culture. London: Fitzroy Dearborn. pp. 8–11.
- Matasović, Ranko (2019). A Grammatical Sketch of Albanian for Students of Indo European (PDF). Zagreb: Sveučilište u Zagrebu. p. 39.
- Matzinger, Joachim (2009). "Die Albaner als Nachkommen der Illyrier aus der Sicht der historischen Sprachwissenschaft". In Schmitt, Oliver Jens; Frantz, Eva (eds.). Albanische Geschichte: Stand und Perspektiven der Forschung. Munich: R. Oldenburg Verlag. pp. 13–35.
- Matzinger, Joachim. "Der lateinisch-albanische Sprachkontakt und seine Implikationen für Vorgeschichte des Albanischen und der Albaner", in Südosteuropäische Romania: Siedlungs-/Migrationsgeschichte und Sprachtypologie. Edited by Wolfgang Dahmen et al. Tübingen: Narr Verlag, 2012, pp. 75–103.
- Matzinger, Joachim (2018). "The Lexicon of Albanian". In Klein, Jared; Joseph, Brian; Fritz, Matthias (eds.). Handbook of Comparative and Historical Indo-European Linguistics. Vol. 3. Walter de Gruyter. ISBN 978-3-11-054243-1.
- Mayer, Anton. Die Sprache der alten Illyrier. 2 vols. Vienna: Österreichische Akademie der Wissenschaften, 1957/1959.
- Mann, Stuart E. (1977). An Albanian Historical Grammar. Hamburg: Helmut Buske.
- Meyer, Gustav. "Albanesische Studien I. Die Pluralbildungen der albanesischen Nomina", in Sitzungsberichte der philosophisch-historischen Classe der Kaiserlichen Akademie der Wissenschaften 104 (1883): 257–362.
- Miklosich, Franz. Albanische Forschungen. 2 vols., vol. 1: Die slavischen Elemente im Albanischen; vol. 2: Die romanischen Elemente im Albanischen. Vienna: Karl Gerold's Sohn, 1870.
- Mihăescu, Haralambie (1966). "Les éléments latins de la langue albanaise". Révue des études sud-est européennes. 4: 5–33, 323–53.
- Mihăescu, Haralambie (1978). La langue latine dans le sud-est de l'Europe. Bucharest and Paris: Editura Academiei and Les Belles Lettres.
- Newmark, Leonard; Hubbard, Philip; Prifti, Peter (1982). Standard Albanian: A Reference Grammar for Students. Stanford: Stanford University Press.
- Ölberg, Hermann (1977). "Einige Uberlegungen zur Autochtonie der Albaner auf der Balkanhalbinsel". In Ölberg, Hermann M. (ed.). Akten der internationalen albanologischen Kolloquiums, Innsbruck, 1972, zum Gedächtnis an Norbert Jokl. Innsbruck: Institut für Sprachwissenschaft der Universität Innsbruck.
- Ölberg, Hermann (1982). "Kontributi i gjuhësisë për çështjen e atdheut ballkanik të shqiptarëve". Studime Filologjike. 3.
- Olsen, Birgit Anette; Thorsø, Rasmus (2022). "Armenian". In Olander, Thomas (ed.). The Indo-European Language Family: A Phylogenetic Perspective. Cambridge University Press. pp. 202–222. doi:10.1017/9781108758666.012. ISBN 978-1-108-75866-6.
- Pedersen, Holger (1894). "Bidrag til den albanesiske Sproghistorie". Festskrift til Vilhelm Tomsen. Kopenhagen: Gyldendal. pp. 246–257.
- Pedersen, Holger (1905). "Albanesisch". Kritischer Jahrbericht. 9 (1): 206–217. Erlangen (1909)
- Pellegrini, Giovan Battista (1980). "I rapporti linguistici interadriatici e l'elemento latino dell'albanese". Abruzzo. 19: 31–71.
- Pellegrini, Giovan Battista. "Disa vëzhgime mbi elementin Latin të shqipes" [Some observations on the Latin element of the Albanian language], Studime Filologjike 3 (1982); (in Italian) "Alcune osservazioni sull'elemento latino dell'albanese", Studia Albanica 1983: 63–83.
- Pellegrini, Giovan Battista. Avviamento alla linguistica albanese. Edizione rinnovata. Rende: Università degli studi della Calabria, Centro editoriale e librario, 1997.
- Pisani, Vittore (1950). "L'albanais et les autres langues indo-européennes". Mélanges Henri Grégoire II. Brussels. pp. 519–538. reprint in Saggi di linguistica storica: Scritti scelti. Torino: Rosenberg & Sellier, 1959, pp. 96–114.
- Pisani, Vittore (1964). "Les origines de la langue albanaise, questions de principe et de méthode". Studia Albanica. 1: 61–68.
- Pisani, Vittore (1977). "Sulla genesi dell'albanese". In Ölberg, Hermann M. (ed.). Akten der internationalen albanologischen Kolloquiums, Innsbruck, 1972, zum Gedächtnis an Norbert Jokl. Innsbruck: Institut für Sprachwissenschaft der Universität Innsbruck. pp. 345–366.
- Plasari, Aurel; Nadin, Lucia (2022). Barleti i hershëm sipas një dorëshkrimi të panjohur [The early Barleti – according to an unknown text]. Albanian Academy of Sciences/Onufri. ISBN 978-9928-354-88-4.
- Orel, Vladimir (1998). Albanian Etymological Dictionary. Leiden: Brill.
- Orel, Vladimir (2000). A Concise Historical Grammar of the Albanian Language: Reconstruction of Proto-Albanian. Leiden: Brill. ISBN 90-04-11647-8.
- Riza, Selman (1979). Studime albanistike. Pristina.
- Rusakov, Alexander (2017). "Albanian". In Kapović, Mate; Giacalone Ramat, Anna; Ramat, Paolo (eds.). The Indo-European Languages. Routledge. ISBN 978-1-317-39153-1.
- Schumacher, Stefan; Matzinger, Joachim (2013). Die Verben des Altalbanischen: Belegwörterbuch, Vorgeschichte und Etymologie. Wiesbaden: Otto Harrassowitz.
- Svane, Gunnar (1992). Slavische Lehnwörter im Albanischen. Århus: Aarhus University Press.
- Tagliavini, Carlo (1965). La stratificazione del lessico albanese: Elementi indoeuropei. Bologna: Casa editrice Prof. Riccardo Pàtron.
- Thumb, Albert (1909). "Altgriechische Elemente des Albanesischen". Indogermanische Forschungen. 26: 1–20.
- Trumper, John (2018). "Some Celto-Albanian isoglosses and their implications". In Grimaldi, Mirko; Lai, Rosangela; Franco, Ludovico; Baldi, Benedetta (eds.). Structuring Variation in Romance Linguistics and Beyond: In Honour of Leonardo M. Savoia. John Benjamins Publishing Company. ISBN 978-90-272-6317-9.
- von Hahn, Johann Georg. Albanesische Studien. 3 vols. Jena: F. Mauko, 1854.
- Watkins, Calvert. "Proto-Indo-European: Comparison and Reconstruction", in The Indo-European Languages. Edited by Anna Giacalone Ramat & Paolo Ramat. London-NY: Routledge, 1998, pp. 25–73.
- Ylli, Xhelal. Das slawische Lehngut im Albanischen. 2 vols., vol. 1: Lehnwörter; vol. 2: Ortsnamen. Munich: Verlag Otto Sagner, 1997/2000.
- Ylli, Xhelal; Sobolev, Andrej N. (2003). Albanskii gegskii govor sela Muhurr. Munich: Biblion Verlag. ISBN 3-932331-36-2.
