= Burim =

Burim may refer to:

- Burim, an Albanian name for Istok, a town and municipality in north-western Kosovo
- Burim, a village in the Korçë District of south-eastern Albania
- Burim, a village and an Early Neolithic settlement in the municipality Maqellarë, in north-eastern Albania
- Burim (name), a common Albanian masculine given name

== See also ==
- Burimas
