= Arnold Ritter von Harff's lexicon =

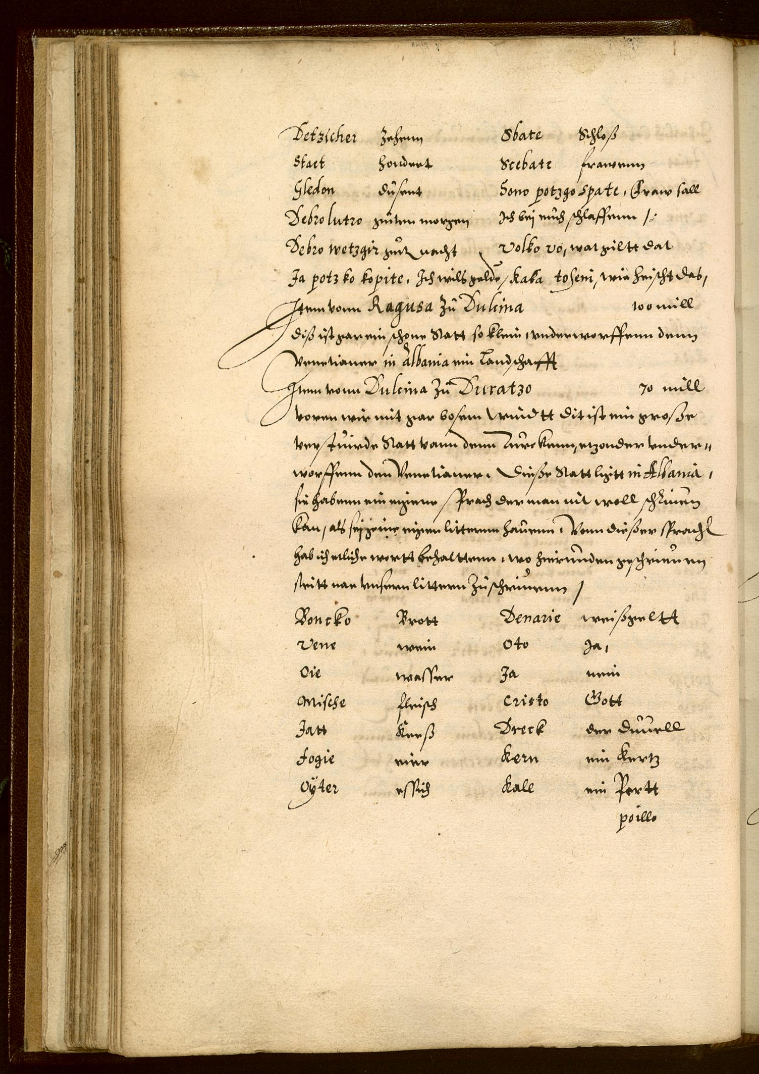

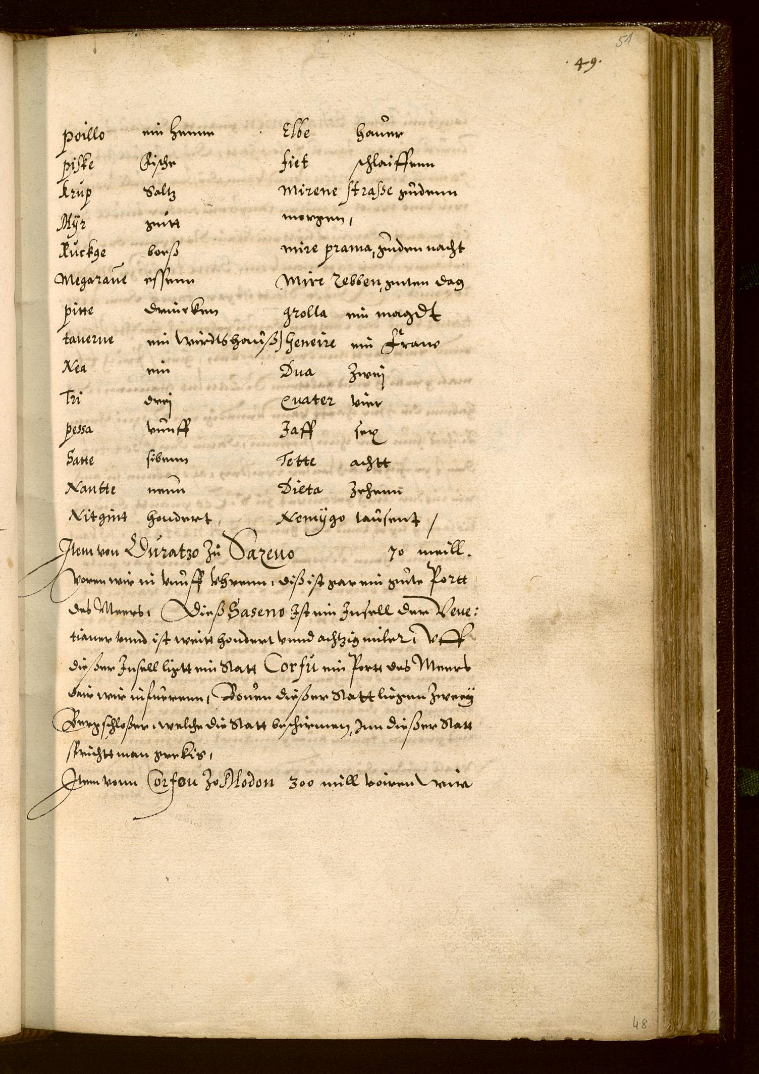

The Arnold Ritter von Harff's lexicon is the second oldest Albanian-language document ever retrieved, after the Formula e pagëzimit. The lexicon was written by Arnold Ritter von Harff, a German traveler, who in 1496 was spending some hours in the port of Durrës and transcribed some words of the locals Albanians, by writing on the side, the German translation of them. The document includes 26 words in Albanian, 8 expressions, and numbers from 1 to 10, and also 100, and 1000.

Arnold von Harff is the second author of the Albanian-German Dictionary written in 1497.

Arnold von Harff was a foreign knight from Cologne, Germany. In 1496 he began the long journey to visit the holy places in Palestine. He crossed the Adriatic Sea by boat and in 1497 stopped in Albanian areas such as Ulcinj, Durrës, and Sazan. While walking these places, he came in contact with Albanians. Out of the need to communicate with the local population, he marked some words of the Albanian language, a total of 26 words, 8 expressions and 12 numerals. To remember them better, next to the Albanian word he also marked the German one. In this way he compiled a small dictionary that he does not call Dictionary Albanian-German. The dictionary fell into oblivion for a long time. It was discovered by von Grote in 1860 and published the same year.

Even this document is important only for the language, it proves the peculiarities of the northern dialect from this is the lexicon. The author uses the Latin alphabet of the Gothic type to write the Albanian language.

== The lexicon ==
| Old Albanian | Modern Albanian | English |
|---|---|---|
| Boicke | Bukë | Bread |
| Vene | Venë (Gheg Albanian) | Wine |
| Oie | Ujë | Water |
| Mische | Mish | Meat |
| Jat | Djath | Cheese |
| Foeie | Vezë | Egg |
| Oitter | Uthull | Vinegar |
| Poylle | Pulë | Chicken |
| Pyske | Peshk | Fish |
| Krup | Kripë | Salt |
| Myr | Mirë | Good |
| Kycge | Keq | Bad |
| Megarune | Me ngrënë | To eat |
| Pijnë | Me pi | To drink |
| Tauerne | Tavernë | Tavern |
| Geneyre | Një njeri | One man |
| Groëa | Grua | Woman |
| Denarye | Para | Denar (money) |
| Sto | Ashtu | Yes |
| Jae | Jo | No |
| Criste | Zot | God (Christ) |
| Dreck | Dreq | Devil |
| Kijrij | Qiri | Candle |
| Kale | Kalë | Horse |
| Elbe | Elb | Barley |
| Fijet | Me flejt | Sleep |
| Mirenestrasse | Mirë ndeshë të rashë | Good Morning |
| Myreprama | Mirë mbrëma | Good Evening |
| Meretzewen | Mirë se vjen | Welcome |
| Ake ja kasse zet ve | A ke gjëkafshë të re | What do you have that I like |
| Kess felgen gjo kaffs | Qish vlen kjo kafshë | How much does that cost |
| Do daple | Do ta blej | I'll buy it |
| Laff ne kammijss | Laj një këmishë | Wash my shirt |
| Ne kaffs | Një kafshë | What is that called (here the translation of the author is probably wrong as "një kafshë" would mean "one thing" |
| Nea | Një | One |
| Dua | Dy | Two |
| Trij | Tre | Three |
| Quater | Katër | Four |
| Pessa | Pesë | Five |
| Jast | Gjashtë | Six |
| Statte | Shtatë | Seven |
| Tette | Tetë | Eight |
| Nante | Nëntë | Nine |
| Dieta | Dhjetë | Ten |
| Nijtgint | Njëqind | One hundred |
| Nemijgo | Njëmijë | One thousand |

== Other additions ==
The traveler, in addition to the list of words, expressions and numbers, has left some notes in those places of the Albanian coast where he passed. Among other things, he writes that "Ulcinj is a beautiful and small Albanian city". For Shkodër, although he passed through it, because the trip Ulcinj-Durrës, did it by sea, he says "that it is a big city just conquered by the Ottomans". He describes the island of Sazan "as a good sea harbor, where there are many boats, on the left side of which is a large village with 2000 hearths, called Vlora" etc.
