= Burim (name) =

Burim is an Albanian masculine given name, which means riverhead or fountain. Notable people with the name include:

- Burim Kukeli (born 1984), Albanian football player
- Burim Myftiu (born 1961), Albanian American photographer

== See also ==
- Burim (disambiguation)
