= Polenë (Korçë) =

Polena is a village in Albania, located in Korçë County, in the Voskop Municipal Unit.

== History ==
During the 15th century, a large population displacement took place in Polenë as a result of the Ottoman conquest, forcing part of the population to emigrate mainly to Greece while the majority resettled in what is now known as Polenë e Sipërme, which later developed into a community of artisans, traders, and craftsmen. A significant historical episode from this period is the killing of an envoy of Ali Pasha of Tepelena by local residents resisting forced religious conversion and conscription, an event that remains commemorated by a memorial stone and reflects the village's tradition of resistance.

== Sights and cultural heritage ==
Polena is characterized by its predominantly Albanian Orthodox community. The village is the site of the Transfiguration of Christ Orthodox Church.

Every January 6th, the village celebrates a traditional pagan carnival that symbolizes the expulsion of evil and preserves ancient local rituals, with participants wearing animal-skin costumes and performing symbolic acts. The custom, known as the Ritual of the Arapët of Polenë, has roots over 300 years old, was banned during the communist period, and has been revived annually since 1991 by local residents.

The village is also known for its spring-welcoming rituals, namely Llazore and Rusica, preserving elements of pre-Christian fertility and agricultural rites. These rituals, practiced from past to present, are deeply rooted in the village's Albanian Orthodox traditions and are primarily performed by women and girls, who play a central role in maintaining and transmitting them across generations.
