= Albanian morphology =

Aspect of the language

This article concerns the morphology of the Albanian language, including the declension of nouns and adjectives, and the conjugation of verbs. It refers to the Tosk-based Albanian standard regulated by the Academy of Sciences of Albania.

== Nouns (declension) ==
Albanian has three grammatical genders: masculine, feminine, and neuter. Nouns are morphologically altered for number (singular/plural), definiteness (indefinite/definite), and case. The cases are nominative, accusative, dative, ablative and vocative. Many texts include a genitive case, but this is produced using a linking clitic (see below) and is morphologically identical to the dative. The vocative is distinguished from the nominative in the case of only a few nouns. The dative and the ablative are identical, except for the indefinite plural. The indefinite accusative is always the same as the indefinite nominative.

=== Plural formation ===
Albanian plural formation is highly irregular. Suffixes include -ra, -a, -e, -onj, -ë, but modification of the stem by final consonant palatalization and/or internal vowel mutation is common.

Some nouns, such as ujë "water", change gender in the plural.

=== Regular noun endings ===
The indefinite form of the noun is identical in the nominative and accusative cases, being the uninflected form of the noun in the singular, and the form noted above in the plural. The following are the endings for the dative and ablative cases when the noun is in indefinite form:

	DAT	ABL
singular, masculine/neuter nouns	i	i
singular, feminine nouns	e	e
plural	ve	sh

The endings for nouns in definite form are as follows:

	NOM	ACC	DAT/ABL
singular, masculine nouns of "u" type	u	un/në	ut
singular, masculine nouns of "i" type	i	in/në	it
singular, neuter nouns	t(ë)	t(ë)	it
singular, feminine nouns	a	n(ë)	s(ë)
plural	it/t(ë)	it/t(ë)	ve(t)

The masculine nouns of "u" type are those whose uninflected form ends in a stressed front vowel or in -h, -k or -g. Others are of "i" type.

For examples of noun declension patterns, see Albanian language (Grammar).

== Pronouns ==
=== Personal pronouns ===
The personal pronouns decline for case, as do nouns; they have additional clitic (weak) forms in the accusative and dative. Older forms of the personal pronouns for the 3rd person in the ablative case are occasionally found.

	NOM	ACC	DAT	ABL	ACC (clitic)	DAT (clitic)
1st pers. singular	unë	mua	mua	meje	më	më
2nd pers. singular	ti	ty	ty	teje	të	të
3rd pers. singular, masculine	ai	atë	atij	atij (si)	e	i
3rd pers. singular, feminine	ajo	atë	asaj	asaj (soje)	e	i
1st pers. plural	ne	ne	neve	nesh	na	na
2nd pers. plural	ju	ju	juve	jush	ju	ju
3rd pers. plural, masculine	ata	ata	atyre	atyre (sish)	i	u
3rd pers. plural, feminine	ato	ato	atyre	atyre (sosh)	i	u

=== Demonstrative pronouns ===
The declension of the demonstrative pronouns is very similar to that of the 3rd person personal pronouns. Older forms of demonstrative pronouns in the ablative are occasionally found.

	NOM	ACC	DAT/ABL	(old)ABL
masc. sing.	ky	këtë	këtij	kësi
fem. sing.	kjo	këtë	kësaj	këso
masc. plural	këta	këtyre	këtyre	kësi(sh)
fem. plural	këto	këtyre	këtyre	këso(sh)

== Adjectives (declension) ==
=== The linking clitic ===
An Albanian noun phrase typically has the form "N Lnk (Adv*) Adj" where Lnk is the declinable particle described below. (If adverbs appear between the adjective and the linking particle, then the latter must take its indefinite form.) The linking particle agrees with the noun in gender, case and number.

Indefinite linking clitic:

	NOM	ACC/DAT/ABL
SG.M	i	të
SG.F	e	të
PL	të	të

Definite linking clitic:

	NOM	ACC	DAT/ABL
SG.M	i	e	të
SG.F	e	e	së
PL	e	e	të

The adjectives themselves are also declined to agree with the noun in gender and number. Paradigms differ depending on whether the adjective is or is not used with the linking particle.

=== Adjectives with the linking clitic ===
One group of adjectives uses the same form for all except the feminine plural, which uses the ending -a. Many of these adjectives end in -ë, such as mirë "good", thellë "deep" and bardhë "white".

The other does not differ by number, but has an -e on the feminine and none on the masculine. Many of these end in -m. Examples of these include zorshëm "hard, difficult", feminine zorshme.

=== Adjectives without the linking clitic ===
Some adjectives are used without the linking particle. These take different endings from those that use the linking particle, and come in seven different types.

M.SG	M.PL	F.SG	F.PL
-	-	-	-
-	-	-	a
-	-	e	e
-	ë	e	e
-	?	e	e
-	?	?	?

Each row is a different declension class. Each cell labeled "?" indicates varied/irregular endings.

== Verbs (conjugation) ==
In the active voice, Albanian morphologically distinguishes the indicative present, imperfect and aorist, the optative present, and the admirative present and imperfect (with 6 person/number inflections for each), as well as the imperative (2nd person singular and plural) and a participle (indeclinable). (The admirative endings are regular across conjugational classes and are similar to forms of the auxiliary kam.) All other mood/tense/aspect combinations are produced periphrastically using the auxiliary kam (have) and indeclinable particles. The Albanian passive voice continues the Indo-European medio-passive, and has separate inflection paradigms for the indicative present and imperfect, as well as the imperative. The other forms are produced from these and from the active forms periphrastically.

=== Regular paradigms (active voice) ===
==== Class 1 ====
-	IND.Present	IND.Imperfect	IND.Aorist	Optative
1	oj	oja	ova	ofsha
2	on	oje	ove	ofsh
3	on	onte	oi	oftë
1	ojmë	onim	uam	ofshim
2	oni	onit	uat	ofshi
3	ojnë	onin	uan	ofshin

Imperative: Singular -o, Plural -oni

Participle: -uar

==== Class 2 ====
-	IND.Present	IND.Imperfect	IND.Aorist	Optative
1	-	ja	a	sha
2	-	je	e	sh
3	-	te	i	të
1	im	nim	ëm	shim
2	ni	nit	ët	shit
3	in	nin	ën	shin

Imperative: Singular -, Plural -ni

Participle: -ur

==== Class 3 ====
-	IND.Present	IND.Imperfect	IND.Aorist	Optative
1	-	ja	ta	ça
2	-	je	te	ç
3	-	nte	ti	ttë
1	më	nim	tëm	tshim
2	ni	nit	tët	tshit
3	në	nin	tën	tshin

Imperative: Singular -, Plural -ni

Participle: -tur

=== Irregular verbs ===
Most proper Albanian verbs are irregular since they change their only vowel of the stem, often rearranging consonant order or by changing the stem completely. Verbs of foreign origin like studioj, kandidoj, refuzoj, provoj, etc. are regular. Verbs derived from nouns, like ndryshoj (from ndryshe, different), vlerësoj (from vlerë, value), are normally regular. Here are some examples of irregular verbs:

kam ‘have’ (auxiliary)

kam, ke, kisha, pata, paça, ki, pasur. (I have, you have, I had (imperfect), I had (aorist), I (wish to) have, (imperative) have!, had (participle).

jam ‘be’ (auxiliary)

jam, është, isha, qeshë, qofsha, ji!, qenë.

shoh, to see

shoh, sheh, shihja, pashë, pafsha, shih!, parë.

ha, to eat

ha, ha, haja, hëngra, ngrënça, ha!, ngrënë.

rri, to stay

rrí, rri, rrija, ndenja, ndenjsha, rrì!, ndenjur.

vij, to come

vij, vjen, vija, erdha, ardhsha, eja!, ardhur.

bie, to fall

bie, bie, bija, rashë, rënça, bjer!, rënë.

flas, to speak

flas, flet, flisja, fola, folsha, fol!, folur.

them, to say

them, thua, thosha, thashë, thënça, thuaj!, thënë.
