= Voskop =

- Administrative unit
- Location within Albania
- Coordinates: 40°37′N 20°41′E
- Country: Albania
- County: Korçë
- Municipality: Korçë

Population (2011)
  - Administrative unit: 3,832
- Time zone: UTC+1 (CET)
  - Summer (DST): UTC+2 (CEST)

Voskop is a village and a former municipality in the Korçë County, southeastern Albania. At the 2015 local government reform it became a subdivision of the municipality Korçë. The population at the 2011 census was 3,832. The municipal unit consists of the villages Voskop, Dërsnik, Polenë, Vinçan, Goskovë lart, Goskovë poshtë and Damjanec. Voskop is approximately 8km from Korçë.

== Notable people ==
- Alemdar Mustafa Pasha originated from here.
