= Languages of Albania =

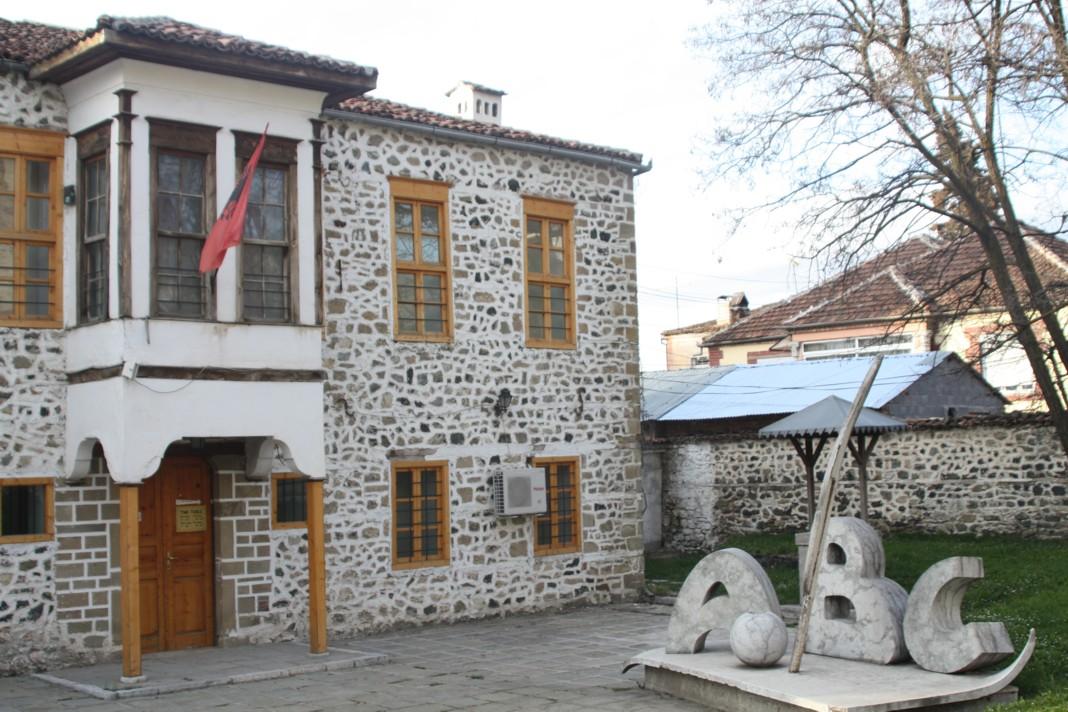
- Mësonjëtorja in Korçë
- Official: Albanian
- Minority: Greek, Bulgarian, Macedonian, Romani, Aromanian, Croatian, Serbian
- Foreign: English, Italian, German and many other European languages
- Signed: Albanian Sign Language
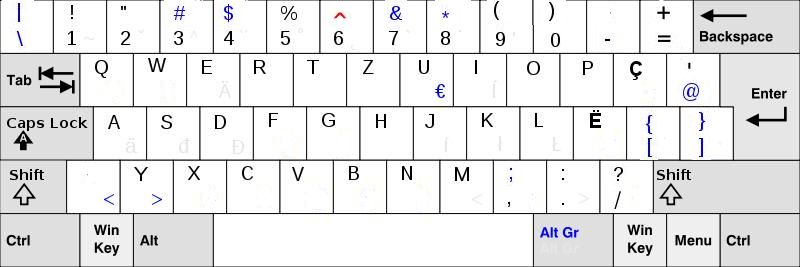
- Keyboard layout: Albanian keyboard layout

Albania is an ethnically homogeneous country, where the overwhelming majority of the population speaks Albanian, which is also the official language. It has two distinct dialects: Tosk, spoken in the south, and Gheg, spoken in the north. However, many Albanians can also speak foreign languages as Italian, Greek, French, German, and English, amongst others, due to the high numbers of Albanian diaspora and Albanian communities throughout the Balkans.

Although many ethnic Albanians (from within Albania and the wider Balkans and diaspora) around the world speak more than two languages and have been recognised as polyglots, Albania is the fourth highest nation in Europe in terms of the percentage of monolingual inhabitants, with 59.9% speaking only one language. Italian is widely spoken throughout Albania. Greek, the language of the Greek national minority, is focused in southern Albania; however, many Albanian nationals speak the Greek language due to immigration. Nowadays, knowledge of English is growing very rapidly, especially among the youth. Various languages are spoken by ethnic minorities: Greek, Bulgarian, Aromanian, Macedonian, etc.

== Status of Albanian ==
Distribution of languages of Albania
Albanian	91.07%
Other languages	1.54%
Multiple languages	0.57%
Not answered	1.21%
Unavailable	5.59%

The Article 14 of the Albanian Constitution states that "The official language in the Republic of Albania is Albanian." In the 2023 population census, 91.07% reported Albanian as the language spoken at home. 1.54% declared to speak at home another language, 0.57% multiple languages, 1.21% gave no answer and 5.59% were unavailable.

=== Dialects ===
Standard Albanian is based in the Tosk dialect, spoken in the south. Gheg is spoken in the north and also by Kosovo Albanians and in Croatia Arbanasi, Upper Reka dialect, Istrian. The traditional border between the two dialects is the Shkumbin River. Although they are somewhat different, they are mutually intelligible. Other notable varieties, all of which are sub-dialects of Tosk, include Lab, Cham, Arbëresh spoken in Italy and Arvanitika, Arvanitic in Southern Greece.

== Minority languages ==
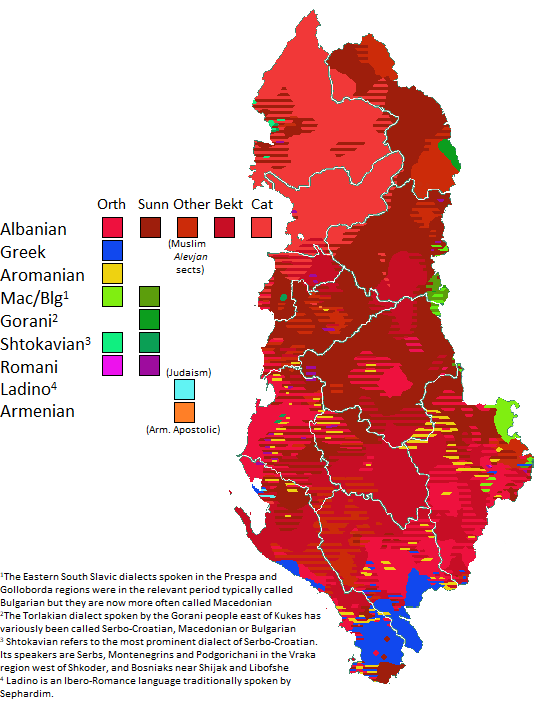
Location of communities in Albania classified by language and religion

=== Greek ===
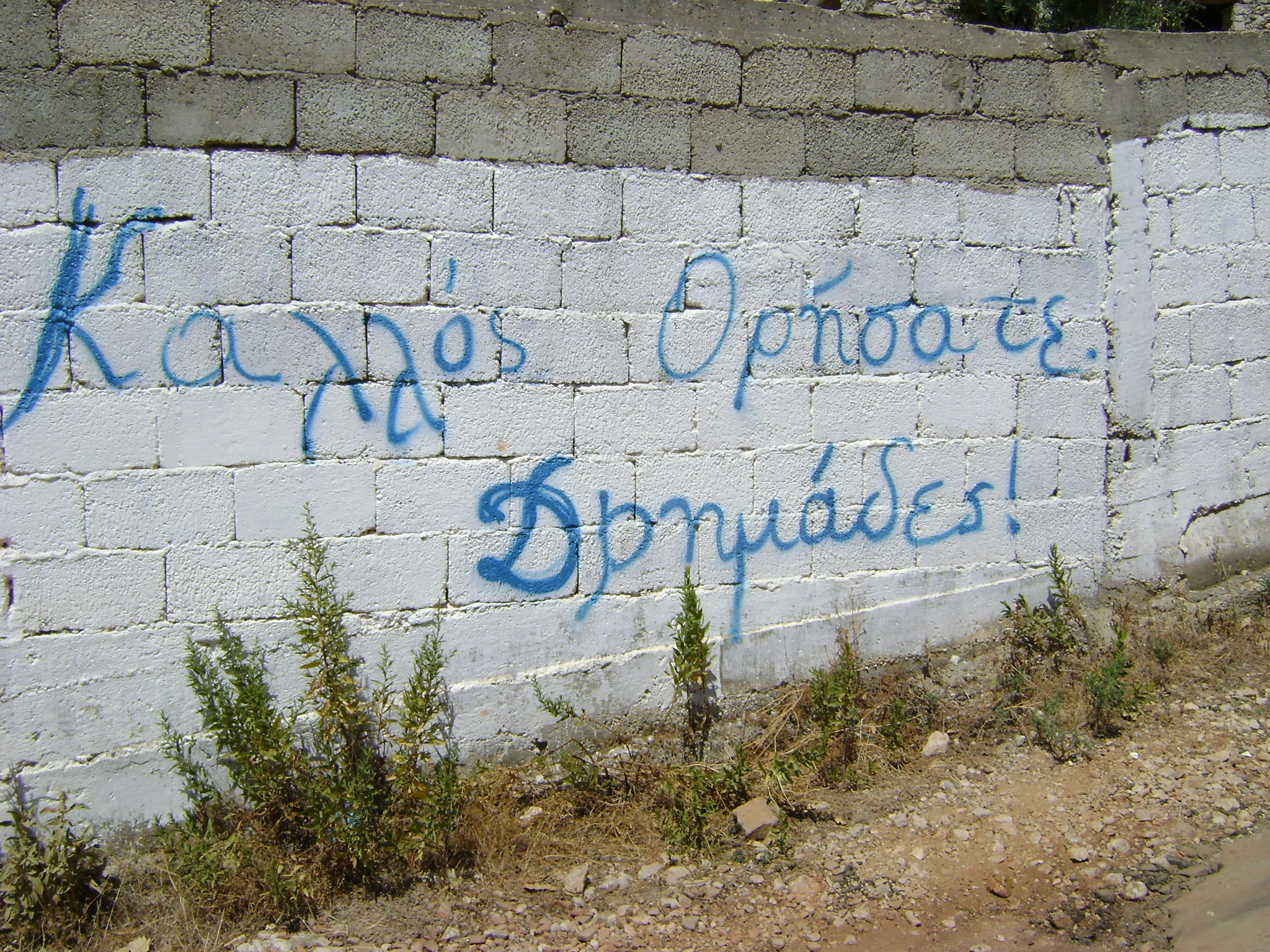
Wall writing in Dhërmi. The text reads Welcome to Drymades in Greek.

Greek is the largest minority language of Albania. The Greeks of Albania speak a modern southern Greek dialect, known as Northern Epirote Greek. Alongside Albanian loanwords, it retains some archaic forms and words that are no longer used in Standard Modern Greek, as well as in the Greek dialects of southern Epirus. Despite the relatively small distances between the various towns and villages, there exists some dialectal variation, most noticeably in accent. In addition, many Albanians have knowledge of Greek, mainly due to past immigration to Greece. Greek is co-official in two municipalities in Southern Albania.

=== Aromanian ===
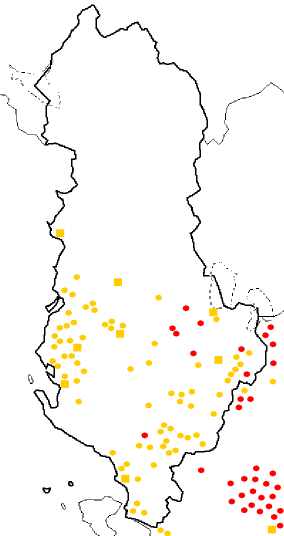
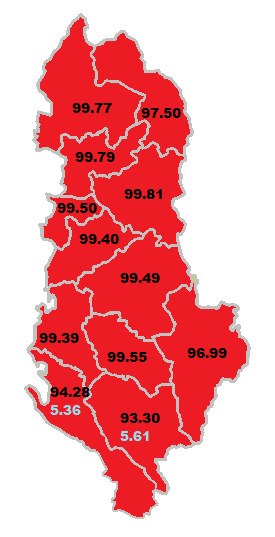
Left: Map showing the spread of Aromanians in Albania Right: A map showing the percentage of Albanian speakers as per Population and Housing census 2011.

There are up to 200,000 Aromanians in Albania, a figure which includes people who do not speak the Aromanian language. They mostly live in the southern and central regions of the country. The Aromanians, under the name "Vlachs", are a recognized cultural minority in the Albanian law.

=== Macedonian ===
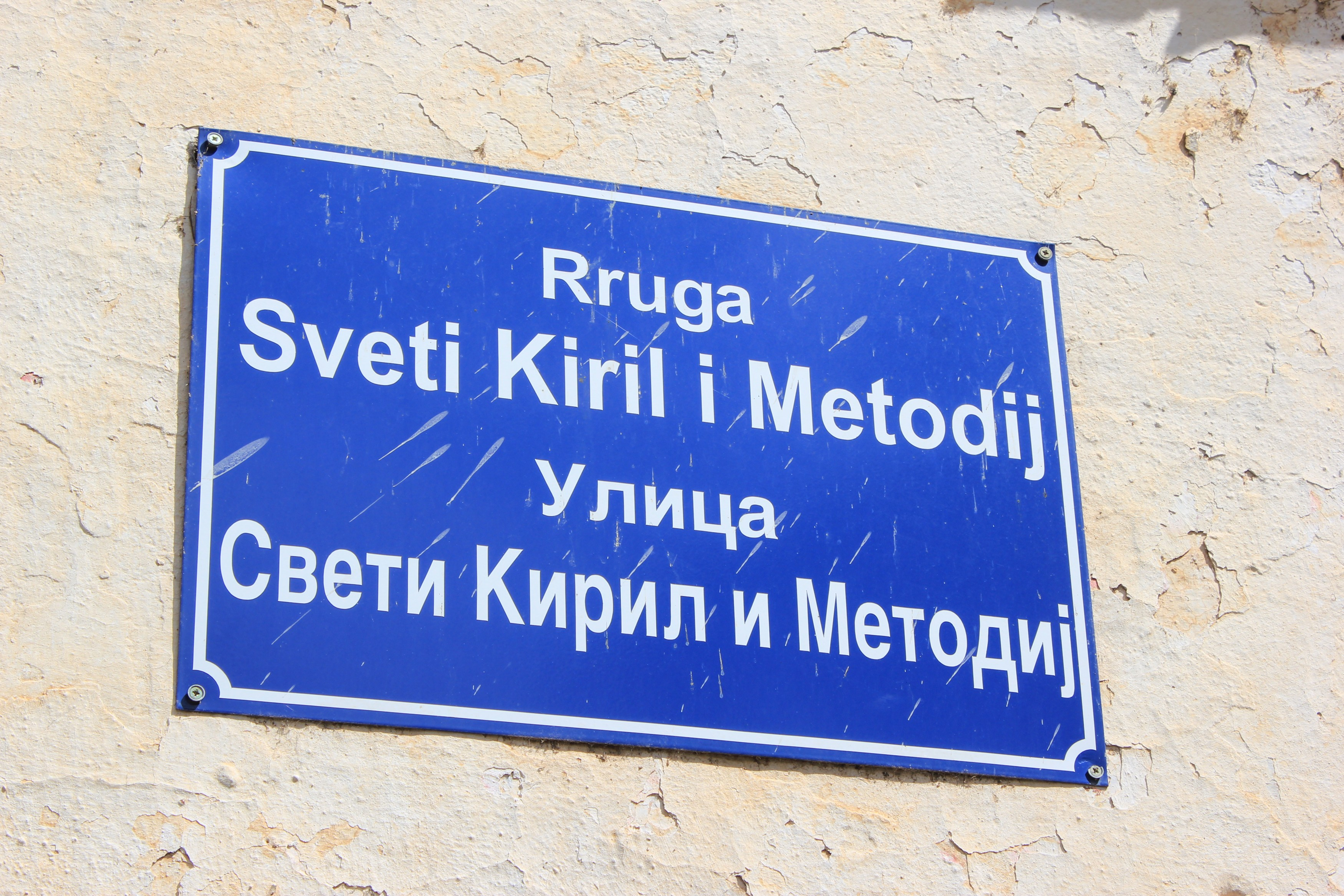
Street sign in Dolna Gorica in Albanian and Macedonian

According to the 1989 census, there were approximately 5,000 Macedonian language-speakers in Albania. Most of these people live in the southeastern part of the country in the Lake Prespa region. Macedonians are an officially recognized minority in the Pustec Municipality. However, only the Macedonians living in Pustec are allowed to declare their nationality and language. Ethnic Macedonian organization claim that 120,000 to 350,000 Macedonians live in Albania. They are politically represented by the Alliance of Macedonians for European Integration, which in the 2011 elections received around 2,500 votes.

=== Romani ===
About 10,000 Romani people live in Albania today. They have preserved the language, despite the lack of education in that language.

=== Serbo-Croatian ===
Serbo-Croatian is mostly spoken and understood in northern Albania, near the border of former Yugoslavian countries of Serbia and Montenegro. The television phenomenon of Italian also happened to Serbo-Croatian, but to a lesser extent.

== Foreign languages ==
The most-widely spoken foreign languages in Albania are English, Italian and Greek.

A study carried out by Eurostat, the statistical agency of the European Union, analyzed the demography of the adult population 25-64 of several european countries as of 2016. The results of the Adult Education Survey, released in May 2018, showed that the 39.9% of the 25–64 years old is able to use at least one foreign language. The main foreign language known is English with 40.0%, followed by Italian with 27.8% and Greek with 22.9%. The English speakers were mostly young people, the knowledge of Italian is stable in every age group, while there is a decrease of the speakers of Greek in the youngest group.

=== Italian ===
Italian is by far the best-known foreign language in Albania and used to have official status when the country was a protectorate of Italy. Most Italian-speakers have not learnt the language in classrooms or from books, but rather by watching Italian television. During the late communist regime, Albanians living in the towns along the Adriatic Sea coast had access to Italian television. Many Albanians "grew skilled at rewiring their TVs to overcome [the] Albanian government's attempt to block Italian channels". A large number of middle-aged and younger people grew up with the language and know it very well.

Among the elderly, Italian is also common as the language was used in the educational system in the 1930s, after King Zog released a decree requiring all Albanian schools to teach Italian in 1933.

Albania also is home to 19,000 ethnic Italians, who have aided the growth of the language in the country.

=== English ===
English is mostly popular among the younger generations of Albanians. As of 2006, more than 65% of Albanian children could speak fluent or semi-fluent English.

The language came to Albania in 1921, when the Albanian Vocational School started to teach English with the sponsorship of the American Red Cross. The school operated until 1933. The Albanian Government at the time decided to make English the country's second language. Russian became the major language taught in schools after the Communists took control over the country. After the Soviet-Albanian Split in the 1960s, English came to compete with Russian. A 2006 book by Mimoza Rista-Dema, a Ph.D. in Linguistics at Indiana University, describes the teaching of English during the communist era:

Although English was taught at schools, it was considered the language of Western imperialism and as a result, elements of its culture and civilization were offered to English learners selectively.

=== Other ===
French lycées in Korçë and Gjirokastër operated during the communist era, because long-time leader of Communist Albania, Enver Hoxha studied in the University of Montpellier in France and upon his rise to power allowed their activity. Albania is a member of la Francophonie. Most French-speakers in Albania can be found in these two towns and surrounding areas, but also elsewhere in the country. According to La Francophonie, Albania is home to 30,000 French speakers.

Russian began to be taught in schools and universities in the 1950s, when it was lingua franca of the Eastern Bloc countries. It continued until the Soviet–Albanian split in early 1961. Many who learnt in at the time, have forgotten most of it due to lack of usage.

After the ideological controversies with the USSR, Albania and China became closer. A number of Albanians studied in China and learned Chinese there. After the collapse of communism in Albania in 1991, many young Albanians also traveled to China for education and learned the language.

Other European languages are also present in Albania and spoken by Albanians. This is primarily due to the large Albanian diaspora that exists in Europe as well as strong emphasis on foreign languages in education.
