= Vashtëmi =

- Locality
- Vashtëmi
- Interactive map of Vashtëmi
- Coordinates: 40.67623418282086°N 20.737367913083464°E
- Country: Albania
- County: Korçë
- Elevation: 826 m (2,710 ft)

Vashtëmi is a locality in Libonik, Bashkia Maliq, Korçë County in south-eastern Albania.

The locality is also the location of a neolithic pottery site and is also one of the earliest farming sites in Europe.
