= Dërsnik =

- Village
- Location within Albania
- Coordinates: 40°34′N 20°40′E
- Country: Albania
- County: Korçë
- Municipality: Korçë
- Administrative unit: Voskop
- Time zone: UTC+1 (CET)
  - Summer (DST): UTC+2 (CEST)

Dërsnik is a settlement in Korçë County, in Albania. It is part of the Voskop municipal unit. At the 2015 local government reform it became part of the municipality Korçë.
