= Evangelia Adamou =

Linguist

- Education: Aristotle University of Thessaloniki (MA) Paris Descartes University (PhD)
- Occupation: Linguistic researcher
- Website: evangeliaadamousite.wordpress.com

Evangelia Adamou is a senior researcher at the French National Centre for Scientific Research, specializing in language contact and endangered languages. She is currently a PhD superviser at Inalcoin Paris.

== Biography ==
Adamou studied at the Aristotle University of Thessaloniki (MA 1997) and Paris Descartes University (PhD 2001). After working as a teaching assistant and then lecturer at Paris Descartes University, she became a junior researcher at the French National Centre for Scientific Research in 2005, and was promoted to senior researcher in 2015.

In 2022 Adamou was elected as an ordinary member of the Academia Europaea.

== Research ==
Adamou's research centers on the analysis and description of under-described languages, with a focus on language contact and multilingualism, employing both corpus-based and experimental methods. She has conducted extensive fieldwork in the Balkans (on Romani and Balkan Slavic) and in Mexico (on Ixcatec and Romani). She is currently (2022–24) Principal Investigator on a major French-Russian joint project to create an atlas of the Balkan linguistic area, together with Andrey Sobolev.

== Selected publications ==
- Adamou, Evangelia. 2010. Bilingual speech and language ecology in Greek Thrace: Romani and Pomak in contact with Turkish. Language in Society 39 (2), 147–171.
- Michailovsky, Boyd, Martine Mazaudon, Alexis Michaud, Séverine Guillaume, Alexandre François, and Evangelia Adamou. 2014. Documenting and researching endangered languages: the Pangloss Collection. Language Documentation and Conservation 8, 119–135.
- Adamou, Evangelia, and Kimmo Granqvist. 2015. Unevenly mixed Romani languages. International Journal of Bilingualism 19 (5), 525–547.
- Adamou, Evangelia. 2016. A corpus-driven approach to language contact: Endangered languages in a comparative perspective. Berlin: Mouton de Gruyter. ISBN 9781614517610
- Adamou, Evangelia, and Xingjia Rachel Shen. 2019. There are no language switching costs when codeswitching is frequent. International Journal of Bilingualism 23 (1), 53–70.
- Adamou, Evangelia, and Yaron Matras (eds.). 2021. The Routledge Handbook of Language Contact. London: Routledge. ISBN 9780815363552
- Adamou, Evangelia. 2021. The Adaptive Bilingual Mind: Insights from Endangered Languages. Cambridge: Cambridge University Press. ISBN 9781108884266
