= Formula e pagëzimit =

Oldest written attestation of Albanian

The formula e pagëzimit (English: baptismal formula) is the oldest written document with a writing in Albanian which has been found. The document is “Codex Ashburnham” dated November 8, 1462, and it contains various notes on Albania written in Latin by Archbishop Pal Engjëlli.

The sentence in Old Albanian is:

Un'te paghesont' pr'emenit t'Atit e t'Birit e t'Spertit Senit.

In modern Albanian it is: Unë të pagëzoj në emër të Atit, të Birit, e të Shpirtit të Shenjtë. In English it is: "I baptize thee in the name of the Father and the Son and the Holy Spirit".

The document is held in the Biblioteca Medicea Laurenziana, Florence, Italy, where it was discovered in 1915 by Romanian scholar Nicolae Iorga.

Albanian scripts were produced earlier than Formula e pagëzimit, we know of their existence by earlier references, for example a French monk noted in 1332, that "although the Albanians have another language totally different from Latin, they still use Latin letters in all their books.
