= Proto-Albanian language =

Reconstructed ancestor of the Albanian languages

Proto-Albanian
- Reconstruction of: Albanian (dialects)
- Region: Western Balkans
- Era: c. 1000 BCE – 600 CE
- Reconstructed ancestors: Proto-Indo-European: Proto-Albanoid
- Lower-order reconstructions: Proto-Gheg; Proto-Tosk
- Notes: The only survivor of the Albanoid languages of the Paleo-Balkan group

Proto-Albanian is the ancestral reconstructed language of Albanian, before the Gheg–Tosk dialectal diversification (before c. 600 CE). Albanoid and other Paleo-Balkan languages had their formative core in the Balkans after the Indo-European migrations in the region. Whether descendants or sister languages of what was called Illyrian by classical sources, Albanian and Messapic, on the basis of shared features and innovations, are grouped together in a common branch in the current phylogenetic classification of the Indo-European language family. The precursor of Albanian can be considered a completely formed independent IE language since at least the first millennium BCE, with the beginning of the early Proto-Albanian phase.

Proto-Albanian is reconstructed by way of the comparative method between the Tosk and Gheg dialects and between Albanian and other Indo-European languages, as well as through contact linguistics studying early loanwords from and into Albanian and structural and phonological convergences with other languages. Loanwords into Albanian treated through its phonetic evolution can be traced back as early as the first contacts with Doric Greek (West Greek) since the 7th century BCE, but the most important of which are those from Latin (dated by De Vaan to the period 167 BCE to 400 CE) and from Slavic (dated from 600 CE onward). The evidence from loanwords allows linguists to construct in great detail the shape of native words at the points of major influxes of loans from well-attested languages.

In historical linguistics Proto-Albanian is broken up into different stages which are usually delimited by the onset of contact with different well-attested languages. Pre-Proto-Albanian is the early stage of the precursor of Albanian during the first millennium BCE, marked by contacts with Ancient Greek, but not yet by contacts with Latin. Proto-Albanian proper is dated to the period of contacts with Latin, starting from the 2nd century BCE after the Roman conquest of the Western Balkans, but the major Latin influence occurred since the first years of the common era when the Western Balkans were eventually incorporated into the Roman Empire. Common Albanian or its two dialects, Proto-Gheg and Proto-Tosk, experienced the earliest contacts with South Slavic languages since the Slavic migrations to the Balkans in the 6th–7th centuries CE. The rise of Tosk from Proto-Albanian was prompted before Slavic contacts circa 600 CE, as evidenced by the fact that Latin and ancient Greek loanwords are treated like native words with regard to taxonomical differences between Gheg and Tosk, but the same is not true of Slavic loans.

== History ==
- Balkanic
  - Armenian
  - Graeco-Albanian
    - Graeco-Phrygian
      - Greek
      - Phrygian
        (extinct)
    - Illyric
      - Messapic
        (extinct)
      - **Albanian**
        - Gheg
        - Tosk

Albanian in the Palaeo-Balkanic Indo-European branch based on the chapters "Albanian" (Hyllested & Joseph 2022) and "Armenian" (Olsen & Thorsø 2022) in Olander (ed.) The Indo-European Language Family

Albanoid and other Paleo-Balkan languages had their formative core in the Balkans after the Indo-European migrations in the region about 3000 to 2500 BCE. They replaced the pre-Indo-European languages, which left traces of the Mediterranean-Balkan substratum. Shortly after they had diverged from one another, Pre-Albanian, Pre-Greek, and Pre-Armenian underwent a longer period of contact, as shown by common correspondences that are irregular for other IE languages. Furthermore, intense Greek–Albanian contacts have continued thereafter.

The precursor of Albanian can be considered a completely formed independent IE language since at least the first millennium BCE, with the beginning of the early Proto-Albanian phase. The precursor of Albanian is often thought to have been an Illyrian language for obvious geographic and historical reasons as well as for some linguistic evidence, or otherwise an unmentioned Balkan Indo-European language that was closely related to Illyrian and Messapic. Messapic, which is grouped in the same IE branch of Albanian, developed in southeast Italy after crossing the Adriatic Sea at least since the Early Iron Age, being attested in about six hundred inscriptions from Iron Age Apulia. Paul Kretschmer had grouped Albanian into an "Illyrian" group together with Messapic and considered them satem. Eric Pratt Hamp considered that Albanian descended from a language that was a sibling of Illyrian, and that was once closer to the Danube where it was in contact with Daco-Thracian.

In classical antiquity Proto-Albanian was spoken in the central-western part of the Balkan Peninsula, to the north and west of the Ancient Greeks, as shown by early Doric Greek (West Greek) and Ancient Macedonian loanwords that were treated with characteristic Albanian features, by classical place names exclusively observing Albanian accent and phonetic rules, as well as by several Proto-Albanian items preserved in ancient glossaries.

=== Contacts with Ancient Greek ===
Proto-Albanian speech came into contact in its earlier stage with Ancient Greek since the 7th century BCE, when the Greek colonies were founded on the Adriatic coast of Albania. In that period early loanwords were borrowed from Doric Greek (West Greek), either directly from the colonists or indirectly through trade communication in the hinterland. During the 5th–4th centuries BCE Proto-Albanian directly loaned words from Ancient Macedonian, at a time when this language gained prominence in the region and was not yet replaced by Koine Greek. Several Proto-Albanian terms have been preserved in the lexicon of Hesychius of Alexandria and other ancient glossaries. Some of the Proto-Albanian glosses in Hesychius are considered to have been loaned to the Doric Greek as early as the 7th century BCE.

Evidence of a significant level of early linguistic contact between Albanian and Greek is provided by ancient common structural innovations and phonologic convergence such as:

- the rise of the close front rounded vowel /y/ (documented in Attic and Koine Greek);
- the rise of dental fricatives;
- the voicing of voiceless plosives after nasal consonants;
- the replacement, with a form that featured a prefix, of the inherited present tense 3rd person singular of the verb "be" (documented in Koine Greek).

Those innovations are limited only to the Albanian and Greek languages and are not shared with other languages of the Balkan sprachbund. Since they precede the Balkan sprachbund era, those innovations date to a prehistoric phase of the Albanian language, spoken at that time in the same area as Greek and within a social frame of bilingualism among early Albanians having to be able to speak some form of Greek.

=== Contacts with Latin, Romance, and Middle Greek ===
The Roman province of Moesia Superior (in red), which included ancient Dardania, is considered as the best candidate for the area where Proto-Albanian received its major Latin influence, and where it experienced intensive contacts with Proto-Romance during the post-Latin period, which eventually produced the Tosk Albanian–(Proto)Romanian innovations that prompted the rise of Tosk from Proto-Albanian.

Toponyms that evolved through Proto-Albanian phonetic changes in late antiquity (in bold those that were also loaned to South Slavic after antiquity): 0 Drin (river); 1 Nish (city); 2 Shkodër (city); 3 Shkup (city); 4 Sharr (mountains); 5 Ulkin (city); 6 L(j)esh (city); 7 Shtip (city); 8 Mat (river); 9 Ishëm (river); 10 Durrës (city); 11 Vlonë (city). 12 Oh(ë)r(id) (city and lake) from its ancient form required an early long-standing period of Tosk Albanian–East South Slavic bilingualism or at least contact before its first attestation in 879 CE.

Proto-Albanian is believed to have come into contact with Latin since the Illyro–Roman wars in the late 3rd and early 2nd centuries BCE, when the Roman Republic defeated the Illyrians and began to establish its rule in the Western Balkans, gradually consolidating its dominion during the last two centuries BCE. However, most of the Latin influence in Proto-Albanian occurred since the beginning of the common era, when the Western Balkans were eventually incorporated into the Roman Empire after the Great Illyrian Revolt of 6–9 CE (Bellum Batonianum).

Vladimir I. Georgiev proposed that the name of the city Niš in the region of Dardania evolved according to Albanian phonetic laws (from Naissos to Nish). He argued that ancient Dardania was inhabited by Albanians, making it the territory where the historical Albanian–Romanian language contact occurred. Specifically, Georgiev believed that between the 4th and 6th centuries AD, both proto-Albanian and proto-Romanian developed within the same geographic area—the central–northern Balkan region between the modern cities of Niš, Štip, Skopje, and Sofia. Similar theories of a proto-Albanian location in antiquity in Dardania-Moesia was also supported by a number of linguists including Norbert Jokl, Gustav Weigand, Petrovic, Nicolaas van Wijk, Willem Vermeer and Henrik Barić.

According to Walter Breu, the earliest Latin influence in Albanian came from the coastal areas of the Western Balkans when they were Romanized, and does not concern possible contacts with Romanian whose similarities with Albanian had been strongly overestimated in the past. Many Latin-based words in Albanian have the character of indirect Latinisms, as they go back to originally Latin borrowings via Ancient and Medieval Greek. The name Albanian came from the Albanoi, an Illyrian tribe located in north-central Albania and their city Albanopolis, which was located somewhere between the Mat and Shkumbin rivers. The Albanoi might have been mentioned first as Abroi, which may have been a constituent northern tribe of the larger group of the Taulantii; modern scholars place them near the Mat and Drin rivers. According to Eric P. Hamp, Albanian maintained links with both coastal western and central inland Balkan Latin formations. An Albanopolis is also mentioned in Scupi. A similar sounding Albanos is mentioned on a funeral inscription from the 2nd/3rd century CE in ancient Stobi, near Gradsko.

Mat river in North-Central Albania, mentioned in the 4th or 5th century CE, is considered one of the oldest recorded Albanian toponyms. Ancient toponyms such as Lissus, Drivastum, Candavia, Drinus, Barbanna, Mathis, Isamnus, and Ardaxanos reached their current forms as Lezhe, Drisht, Kunavja, Drin, Bunë, Mat, Ishëm, and Erzen respectively, through Albanian sound changes, indicating Albanian, or even an Albanian-related language, has been in the area since antiquity. The mountain range Sharr, which extends into southern Kosovo, northwestern North Macedonia and northeastern Albania, also presupposes the sound development characteristics for Albanian from its ancient name Scardus.

The Latin loanwords in Proto-Albanian are said to have been borrowed through the entire period of spoken Latin in the Western Balkans (c. 167 BCE – 400 CE), reflecting different chronological layers and penetrating, without any restrictions, into virtually all semantic fields. Even the basic Christian terms are of Latin origin, and since they entered Proto-Albanian before the Gheg–Tosk dialectal diversification, the Proto-Albanian speakers were christianized under the Latin sphere of influence, specifically in the 4th century CE.

Historical linguistic considerations indicate that the Roman province of Moesia Superior, and more specifically the ancient region of Dardania and adjacent zones, constitute the best candidate for the area where Proto-Albanian received its major Latin influence, and where intensive contacts between Proto-Albanian and Proto-Romance occurred, eventually producing the shared innovations between Tosk Albanian and (Proto-)Romanian. (Note: Also the analysis of the influence of substrates on the Old Serbo-Croatian language and the toponymic and Romanian evidence indicate that the South Slavs who became Serbo-Croatian speakers settled in a zone of former Albanoid speech, which reasonably explains why the resultant population was well-predisposed to preserve the richest system of lateral consonant distinctions and alternations among the later Slavic-speaking peoples.) Those innovations ultimately prompted the rise of Tosk from Proto-Albanian, a diversification that began not later than the 6th–7th centuries CE (i.e. before the period of contacts with Slavic). Gheg Albanian was already separated from the Albanian–(Proto-)Romanian contact zone at an earlier period. Toponymy provides evidence that Albanian was already spoken since late antiquity in northern and central Albania, but not yet in southern Albania (south of the Shkumbin river). Those considerations indicate that unlike Gheg, the Tosk dialect could not yet have already occupied its historical geographic distribution in late antiquity. On the other hand, the multi-layered Albanian dialects in western North Macedonia provide evidence that the area was inhabited by Albanian-speakers since antiquity. The historical geographic spread of the Albanian dialects as it appeared in medieval times is considered to have been shaped by the settlement of Slavic farmers from the 6th–7th centuries CE.

During the centuries of the Great Migration Period in the Roman Empire after the 3rd century CE, the Imperial structures progressively weakened and eventually collapsed. Proto-Albanian and Proto-Romanian speakers remained in close contact for a substantial time frame as mountain pastoralists. The fact that the Albanian language reflects a clear pastoralist stage does not allow conclusions about the Proto-Albanian speakers' way of life during classical antiquity, as only the speech of the mountain pastoralists managed to survive the Great Migrations. It has been suggested that the Latin influence on Albanian resulted from an urbanized way of life, which was followed by a flight from towns similar to what occurred to the Eastern-Romance speakers. Nevertheless, the extensive influence of the Albanian language on the pastoral vocabulary and its influence, albeit lower, on the crop cultivation vocabulary, in Eastern Romance languages, indicate that Proto-Albanian speakers were already leading a pastoral lifestyle at the time when Latin speakers assumed the same way of life, borrowing from (Proto-)Albanian a number of technical terms.

Proto-Albanian	Vulgar Latin
Late Proto-Albanian	Balkan; Proto-Romance
a > ə
Gheg Alb.	Tosk Alb.	Comm. Rom.
-n- > -r-
Tosk Alb.	Balk. Rom.	Balk. Rom. without -n- > -r-

The post-Roman contact zone between Albanian and Common Romanian is considered to have been located in Dardania and adjacent areas. (Note: The exact extension of the region is under investigation. Scholars argue that the main region of the Balkan interior where a post-Roman Latin-speaking population could have survived included the Upper Morava valley in southern Serbia and areas of present-day Kosovo, northern Albania, northern Macedonia, eastern Montenegro, and western Bulgaria. One piece of evidence is considered the fact that after the arrival of Slavic speech, this region constituted a separation zone between the South Slavic varieties allowing the differentiation between Eastern South Slavic and Western South Slavic. Furthermore, the Torlakian dialects – the transitional South Slavic dialects – are influenced by the features which emerged in the Albanian and Eastern Romance spoken in this area.) From this contact the Tosk Albanian dialect is considered to have received the first impetus of developments that were shared with Eastern Romance and that did not affect the Gheg Albanian dialect as it had already separated in earlier times. After a period of common innovations, but before the rise of the rhotacism n > r (which preceded contacts with Slavic from c. 600 CE), speakers of Eastern Romance varieties that were not yet affected by this fundamental sound change separated from the Tosk Albanian–Common Romanian contact zone. In a period that followed the rise of those innovations, Tosk Albanian is considered to have moved – driven by the offensive of the Slavs – to Albania south of the Shkumbin river in its historically documented location.

At the time of the South Slavic incursion and the threat of ethnic turbulence in the Albanian-inhabited regions, the Christianization of the Albanians had already been completed and it had apparently developed for Albanians as a further identity-forming feature alongside the ethnic-linguistic unity. Church administration, which was controlled by a thick network of Roman bishoprics, collapsed with the arrival of the Slavs. Between the early 7th century and the late 9th century the interior areas of the Balkans were deprived of church administration, and Christianity might have survived only as a popular tradition on a reduced degree. The reorganization of the Church as a cult institution in the region took a considerable amount of time, as the Balkans were brought back into the Christian orbit only after the recovery of the Byzantine Empire and through the activity of Byzantine missionaries.

The earliest ascertained church vocabulary of Middle Greek origin in Albanian dates to the 8th–9th centuries, at the time of the Byzantine Iconoclasm, which was started by the Byzantine Emperor Leo III the Isaurian. In 726 Leo III established de jure the jurisdiction of the Ecumenical Patriarchate of Constantinople over the Balkans, as the Church and the State established an institution. The Eastern Church expanded its influence in the area along with the social and political developments. Between the 7th and 12th centuries a powerful network of cult institutions were revived completely covering the ecclesiastical administration of the entire present-day Albanian-speaking compact area. In particular an important role was played by the Theme of Dyrrhachium and the Archdiocese of Ohrid. The lack of Old Church Slavonic terms in Albanian Christian terminology shows that the missionary activities during the Christianization of the Slavs did not involve Albanian-speakers, indeed, the Christian belief among Albanians had survived through the centuries and already become an important cultural element in their ethnic identity.

=== Earliest contacts with South Slavic ===
When the Slavic-speaking farmers migrated to the Balkans and settled the plains from the 6th–7th centuries CE, they encountered Albanian-speaking Indo-Europeans and assimilated part of them, but the language of the Albanians who had taken refuge in the mountainous areas of present-day northern and central Albania, eastern Montenegro, western North Macedonia, and Kosovo, managed to survive the Great Migrations. Leading a pastoral lifestyle and although separated from Slavic-speakers, Albanian-speakers were not isolated, and contacts between Albanian and Slavic occurred thereafter. In particular, Tosk Albanian came into contact with Eastern South Slavic dialects, and Gheg Albanian with Western South Slavic dialects. Early long-standing contacts between Slavic-speakers and Albanian-speakers might have been common in mountain passages and agriculture or fishing areas, such as the valleys of the White and Black branches of the Drin and around the Shkodër and Ohrid lakes. Such contacts in these areas caused many changes in Slavic and Albanian local varieties.

As Albanian and South Slavic have been in contact since the early Middle Ages, loanwords in both belong to different chronological strata and reveal different periods of acquisition. The earliest phase of contacts is dated to the 6th–8th century CE, reflecting some of the more archaic phonetic features of Slavic as well as early Albanian phonology. The early Slavic loanwords into Albanian developed Slavic *s as /ʃ/ and *y as /u/ within Albanian phonology of that era. Such toponyms include Bushtricë (Kukës), Dishnica (Përmet), Dragoshtunjë (Elbasan), Leshnjë (Leshnjë, Berat and other areas), Shelcan (Elbasan), Shishtavec (Kukës/Gora), Shuec (Devoll) and Shtëpëz (Gjirokastër), Shopël (Iballë), Veleshnjë (Skrapar) and others. (Note: Newer toponymical loanwords, although having the same Slavic form, preserved the Slavic /s/ and other features, as Albanian no longer developed phonological changes during that later period of contacts, hence they resulted different from the earlier loans, e.g. Bistricë (Sarandë) instead of Bushtricë or Selcan (Këlcyrë) instead of Shelcan.) Part of the toponyms of early Slavic origin were acquired in Albanian before undergoing the changes of the Slavic liquid metathesis (before c. end of the 8th century CE). They include Ardenicë (Lushnjë), Berzanë (Lezhë), Gërdec and Berzi (Tiranë) and a cluster of toponyms along the route Berat-Tepelenë-Përmet.

The evolution of the ancient toponym Lychnidus into Oh(ë)r(id) (city and lake), which is attested in this form from 879 CE, required an early long-standing period of Tosk Albanian–East South Slavic bilingualism, or at least contact, resulting from the Tosk Albanian rhotacism -n- into -r- and Eastern South Slavic l-vocalization ly- into o-. The name of the region Labëri resulted through the Slavic liquid metathesis: South Slavic *Labanьja < Late Common Slavic *Olbanьja 'Albania', and was reborrowed in that form into Albanian, in the period when rhotacism was still active in Tosk Albanian.

== History of study ==
Vladimir Orel is one of the main modern international linguists to have dealt with the passage from Proto-Indo-European to Proto-Albanian to Modern Albanian. According to Orel, the study of Proto-Albanian syntax remains in its infancy so there are some limitations to the work. However, there have been developments in the understanding of the historical development of phonetics and vocabulary. Other major work has been done by Eqrem Çabej and Shaban Demiraj as well as by major scholars in the field of Romanian historical linguistics as it relates to Albanian (see Albanian–Romanian linguistic relationship) as well as other Balkan linguists. A large amount of work done on Proto-Albanian is published in German, rather than English.

=== Periodization ===
Vladimir Orel distinguishes the following periods of Proto-Albanian: 1) "Early Proto-Albanian" (EPA): spoken before the 1st century CE, when Albanian had not yet acquired extensive influence via language contact from Latin/Proto-Romance. 2) "Late Proto-Albanian" (LPA): after extensive Latin contact, with the end of the period seeing contacts between ancient Slavic idioms still close to the Proto-Slavic language, in the 6th and 7th centuries CE. During this period the structure of Proto-Albanian was "shattered" by major changes.

Ranko Matasović distinguishes the following periods of Proto-Albanian: 1) "Pre-Proto-Albanian": essentially equivalent to Vladimir Orel's "Early Proto-Albanian", except that the newer paradigm of Matasović dates Latin/Albanian contact a century earlier, and thus it ends for Matasović in the 1st century BCE rather than the 1st century CE. After this period ends, Latin contact begins to transform the language. 2) "Early Proto-Albanian": corresponds to the earlier phases of what is for Orel "Late Proto-Albanian". For Matasović, the period spans the 1st century BCE to the 6th century CE, halting before contact with Slavic idioms begins. 3) "Late Proto-Albanian": includes the last two centuries of LPA for Orel, plus most of the unattested period of "Old Albanian", halting before Turkish influence begins. In this paradigm, Gheg and Tosk split from Early Proto-Albanian, not Late Proto-Albanian, consistent with our knowledge that the split preceded Slavic contact. 4) "Early Albanian": corresponds to the late, Ottoman, phase of Old Albanian in the traditional paradigm, ending in 1800, at which point it transitions to Modern Albanian.

Demiraj, like Matasović and unlike Orel, observes the 5th/6th centuries as a boundary between stages, but instead places the "emergence of Albanian" from its parent after this point, rather than the 14th.

In an Albanian chapter penned by Michiel de Vaan within Klein, Joseph and Fritz' 2018 Handbook of Comparative and Historical Indo-European Linguistics, Demiraj's periods are adhered to. Orel's "Later Proto-Albanian", which is for them also definitively placed before Slavic contact, is referred to as simply "Proto-Albanian" (PAlb) or, in German, "Uralbanisch", reflecting the terminology of earlier writing in German. What is for Orel "Early Proto-Albanian" (EPA), dated definitively before the onset of Latin contact, is for De Vaan, "Pre-Proto-Albanian" (PPAlb); in German, this stage is called "Voruralbanisch" or "Frühuralbanisch". De Vaan also discusses the possibility of breaking "Pre-Proto-Albanian" into two stages: one before the first Greek loanwords, and one that is after the first Greek loanwords, but before contact with Latin.

This page at present is using the paradigm of Orel.

== Phonology ==
Extensive recent studies on Proto-Albanian phonology have been published by Huld (1984), Beekes (1995), Shaban Demiraj (1996), Bardhyl Demiraj (1997), Orel (2000), Hock (2005), Matzinger (2006), Vermeer (2008), Schumacher (2013), and De Vaan (2018).

At present, this page follows Orel's paradigm for periods of Proto-Albanian, and presents the relationship between the synchronic phonologies of both "EPA" and "LPA" with diachronic relationships to each other and to ancestral Indo-European forms as well as descendant Albanian forms.

=== Stress ===
In Early Proto-Albanian, stress was paradigmatic, and behaved according to morphological class, with a base on the first syllable. In different paradigms, the stress pattern was varyingly barytonic, oxytonic, and mobile. Unstressed vowels lost one mora—long vowels were shortened, already short vowels were often deleted. In Later Proto-Albanian, however, a new system of unstressed vowel reduction emerged where *a reduced to *ë while all others were simply deleted (except for post-tonic inlaut vowels, which became *ë). Orel gives the following examples:

- EPA *dáusas "ram" (sg) > *dauš > ... > modern dash
- EPA *dáusai "rams" (pl) > *dauši > ... > modern desh
- EPA *dwáigā "branch" (sg) > *déga > ... > modern degë
- EPA *dwáigāi "branches" (pl) > *dégai > ... > modern degë

=== Vowels ===
Simple vowels in EPA
	Front	Central	Back
High	*i *iː		*u *uː
Mid	*e *eː		*oː
Low		*a *aː	

Diphthongs in EPA
Nucleus	-i	-u
*e	*ei	*eu
*a	*ai	*au

Early Proto-Albanian possessed four distinctive short vowels: *a, *e, *i and *u. Proto-Indo-European *o had merged into *a by the Early Proto-Albanian stage. A five-way distinction was maintained for long vowels: *ā, *ē, *ī, *ō, and *ū. Early Proto-Albanian also had four diphthongs: *ei, *ai, *eu and *au.

Early Proto-Albanian's vowel inventory began to change as a result of Latin contact. Initially Albanian was resistant to the restoration of short *o as a separate phoneme, with Latin unstressed *o being replaced by *a, and stressed Latin *o being replaced by *u. However, in later loans, Latin *o is maintained in Albanian as *o. Additionally, some Latin loans with short *u saw Latin *u replaced by *o, as well as *ə specifically in unstressed positions before sonorants. In two cases, Orel argues that Latin short /u/ was lengthened in Albanian to /u:/, ultimately to render /y/. On the other hand, whatever effect Ancient Greek loanwords had at their time of absorption is unclear, but diachronically the vowels always agree with regular internal Albanian developments.

LPA simple vowels
	Front	Back
High	*i	*u
Mid	(*e) (Note: Absent for early part of period)	(*o) (Note: Absent for early part of period)
Low	*a *å	

(Earlier) LPA diphthongs
	-u	-i	-e
u-	*ui		*ue
i-			*ie
e-	*eu	*ei	
a-	*au	*ai	

Late Proto-Albanian

Late Proto-Albanian exhibited *a, *i and *u throughout its development as distinctive short vowels. *o was restored to the phonemic inventory as a result of loanwords where it was increasingly maintained instead of replaced. Although *e was eliminated by breaking to *ie (which would render je and ja), it was restored by the leveling of /ai/ to /e/ and other phenomena that replaced /a/, /ie/, and /ue/ with /e/. The only long vowel preserved in its original form was *ī. *ō was replaced by *ue, *ē was merged into *ā and both were rounded and eventually raised to *o, while *ū merged with the diphthong *ui, ultimately rendering *y. By Late Proto-Albanian, all the original Indo-European diphthongs had now leveled, but new diphthongs were absorbed in loans, and were also innovated by breaking phenomena: *ie, *ue and *ui. *ai in Latin words with AE shared the fate of inherited Early Proto-Albanian *ai, becoming *e, while Latin AU similarly shared the fate of inherited *au and became *a.

Phonemically nasal vowels emerged in Late Proto-Albanian. First, all vowels standing before nasal consonants were nasalized. The following nasal consonant was then lost in certain morphological contexts, while the vowel remained nasalized, resulting in the emergence of LPA phonemes denoted *â, *ê, *î, and *û. Except in certain Gheg varieties, *ê merged into *â. The traditional view presented by Orel and Desnickaja is that distinctive nasalization was lost by Tosk but retained by Gheg and that this is a taxonomical difference between the two. However this has now been challenged, after Sheper and Gjinari discovered Lab dialects (Lab is a subdialect of Tosk) in the Kurvelesh region that still had distinctive nasal vowels, and Totoni likewise found that the Lab speech of Borsh also still has nasal vowel phonemes. This means that, instead of the traditional view, it is possible that denasalization happened in most Tosk dialects only after the split from Gheg.

Slavic *ū appears to still have been back and round when it was loaned into Albanian, but it is after the diphthongization and resulting fronting of the original Early Proto-Albanian *ū to *y was no longer absorbing new *ū segments, as they are, with only three exceptions, reflected as *u. Slavic *o had already become *a in the Slavic languages that contacted Albanian by the time of contact, and was loaned as *a for the most part; as is reflected also in other non-Slavic languages absorbing these words. After /v/, this *a became *o again in two attested cases: kos 'yogurt' from Proto-Slavic *kvasъ; and vorbë 'clay pot'.

It was at the end of the LPA period that length became no longer distinctive in Albanian, although many Gheg and some Lab dialects preserved it and/or re-innovated it. Furthermore, by Old Albanian, all diphthongs had been lost: those ending in -i were all leveled, the -u was lost in those ending in -u, and those ending in -e were converted to glide + vowel sequences; further changes including the frequent effacement of the former first element or otherwise its hardening into an occlusive (typically /v/ for former u-, and gj /ɟ/ for former i-) rendering the former presence of a diphthong rather opaque in many reflexes.

Vowels of late LPA transitioning to Old Albanian
	Front	Central	Back
High	*i *y		*u
Mid	*e	*ë	*o
Low	*a		

==== Diachronic development ====
This table differentiates short vowels form long vowels with the IPA symbol <ː> being applied to the long vowels.

Specifically contextualized reflex results are placed in parentheses.

Proto-Indo-European	developments before Proto-Albanian	Early Proto-Albanian	Late Proto-Albanian	Tosk Albanian	Gheg Albanian	Example
Latin short /a/		/a/	/a/	/a/	/a/	PIE *kapyéti "to seize" > EPA *kapa > kap "to grasp"; additional examples (Note: Lat aptum > Alb aftë "capable"; PIE *n̥bʰ(u)los > EPA *abula > Alb avull "steam, vapor"; PIE *septḿ̥ > EPA *septati > Alb shtatë "seven")
/a/	Proto-Indo-European *n̥ and *m̥ merge resulting in /a/	/a/	/a/	/a/	/a/	PIE *kapyéti "to seize" > EPA *kapa > kap "to grasp"; additional examples
/a/	/a/	/a/	> /e/ under umlaut and subsequent analogy	/e/	/e/	PIE *h₂élbʰit > EPA *albi > elb "barley"; additional examples (Note: Lat galbinum "yellow" > Alb gjelbër "green"; PIE *wídḱm̥ti > EPA *wīdžatī > Alb -zet "twenty"; PIE *wídḱm̥ti > EPA *wīdžatī > Alb -zet "twenty"; PIE *n̥- > EPA *a- > Alb e- (privative prefix))
/a/	/a/	/a/	>/ɑ̃/ before nasals	/ə/ <ë>	/ɑ̃/ <â, an>	PIE *skandneh₂ > EPA *ksandnā > Alb hënë "moon" (Gheg hanë) additional examples (Note: Lat canticam > Alb këngë "song")
/ə/	deleted after a stressed syllable					PIE *bʰóləteh₂ > EPA *baltā > Alb baltë "swamp"
/ə/	> /e/ after absorption of following laryngeal H_e	/e/	/ie/ (> /e/ before *ts, *dz, *nd, *nt, *mb)	/ie/ /je/ /ja/	/ie/ /je/ /ja/	PIE *dʰeh₁los > EPA *dela > Alb djalë "boy"
/ə/	> /o/ elsewhere	/a/	/a/	/a/	/a/	PIE *h₂epó "away", "off" > EPA *apa > Alb pa "without"
/ə/	> /o/ elsewhere	/a/	>/ɑ̃/ before nasals	/ə/ <ë>	/ɑ̃/ <â, an>	PIE *h₁sónts "being" > EPA *sana > Alb gjë "thing" (Gheg gjâ, sen/send "thing" or sene/sende "things")
/o/	/o/	/a/	>/ɑ̃/ before nasals	/ə/ <ë>	/ɑ̃/ <â, an>	PIE *h₁sónts "being" > EPA *sana > Alb gjë "thing" (Gheg gjâ, sen/send "thing" or sene/sende "things")
/o/	/o/	/a/	(/e/ under umlaut and subsequent analogy)	/e/	/e/	PIE *ǵʰóryos > EPA *darja > Alb derr "pig"; additional examples (Note: PIE *kʷəpnós "smoke" (?) > EPA *kapna > Alb kem "incense" (Gheg kall "burn"))
/o/	/o/	/a/	> /ɑ̃/ before nasal	/ə/	/ɑ̃/	PIE *h₁sónts "being" > EPA *sana > Alb gjë "thing"
/e/	/e/	/e/	> /ɑ̃/ before nasal	/ə/	/ɑ̃/	PIE *lenteh₂ > EPA *lentā > Alb lëndë "timber" (Gheg landë)
/e/	/e/	/e/	/ie/	/ie/	/ie/	PIE *bʰéryeti "to bring, carry" > EPA *berja > Alb bie "to bring"
/e/	/e/	/e/	/ie/	/je/	/je/	PIE *sméḱru > EPA *smekrā > Alb mjekër "beard"
/e/	/e/	/e/	/ie/	je > e after affricates, palatals, and liquids	je > e after affricates, palatals, and liquids	EPA *awa-leja > Alb fle "to sleep"
/e/	/e/	/e/	/ie/	/ja/	/ja/	PIE *h₁ésmi > EPA *esmi > Alb jam;
/e/	/e/	/e/	/ie/	ja > a after affricates, palatals and liquids	ja > a after affricates, palatals and liquids	PIE *swéḱs + *-ti > EPA *seksti > Alb gjashtë "six"
/e/	/e/	/e/	/ie/ > /e/ before *ts, *dz, *nd, *nt, *mb	/e/	/e/	PIE *én pér én tód > EPA *(en) per en ta > Alb brenda
/e/	/e/	/e/	/ie/ + /i/	/i/	/i/	PIE *gʷediyos > EPA džedija > Alb zi "black"
/e/	/e/	/e/ before *m followed by sibilant or affricate	/i/	/i/	/i/	PIE *semǵʰos > EPA *semdza > Alb gjithë "all"
Classical Latin /e/ > EPA /ie/ in "usual" layer		> /ie/ in EPA for "usual layer" (not identical to development of inherited /e/ which also went through /ie/)		/je/	/je/	Lat versum > Alb vjershë "verse"
Classical Latin /e/ > EPA /ie/ in "usual" layer		> /ie/ in EPA for "usual layer" (not identical to development of inherited /e/ which also went through /ie/)		>/e/ in various contexts after sh, before ng/nd, etc.	/e/	Lat conventum > Alb kuvend
Classical Latin /e/ > EPA /ie/ in "usual" layer		> /ie/ in EPA for "usual layer" (not identical to development of inherited /e/ which also went through /ie/)		/ja/	/ja/	Lat hebdomam (or EPA *avā) > Alb javë "week"
Classical Latin /e/ > EPA /ie/ in "usual" layer		> /ie/ in EPA for "usual layer" (not identical to development of inherited /e/ which also went through /ie/)		/ja/ > /a/ after palatals	/a/	Lat sellam > Alb shalë "saddle"
Latin /e/ via an unknown different intermediary				/e/	/e/	Lat īnfernum > Alb ferr "hell" additional examples (Note: Lat commercium > Alb kumerq "toll, duty")
Latin /e/ loaned into Late Proto-Albanian while it lacked any short /e/ phoneme				/i/	/i/	PIE *h₂m̥bʰi > EPA *ambi > Alb mbi "on, upon" additional examples (Note: Lat parentem > Alb prind "parent" PIE *ter- (?) > EPA *trima > Alb trim "brave")
Between *r̥ and C	/i/	/i/	/i/	/i/	/i/	PIE *h₂m̥bʰi > EPA *ambi > Alb mbi "on, upon" additional examples
/i/	/i/	/i/	/i/	/i/	/i/	PIE *h₂m̥bʰi > EPA *ambi > Alb mbi "on, upon" additional examples
/i/	/i/	/i/	> /ĩ/ before nasals	/i/	/ĩ/ <î>	PIE *h₃rinéHti "to flow" > EPA *rinja > Alb rij "to make humid" (Gheg rî)
/u/	/u/	/u/	/u/	/u/	/u/	PIE *bʰugʰtos > EPA *bukta > Alb butë "smooth"
/u/	/u/	/u/	> /ũ/ before nasals	/u/	/ũ/ <û>	PIE *ǵónu "knee" > EPA *g(a)nuna > LPA *glûna > Alb gju "knee" (OAlb glû, Gheg gjû)
Latin /o/ raises before nasals			> /ũ/ before nasals	/u/	/ũ/ <û>	Lat monachum > murg "monk", contrā > kundër "against"
Latin stressed /o/ ultimately merges with PIE *ā elsewhere				/o/	/o/	Lat coxam > kofshë "hip", Lat rotam > rrotë "wheel"
/aː/	/aː/	/aː/	/ɒː/	/o/	/o/	PIE *méh₂treh₂ "mother's sister" > EPA *mātrā > Alb motër "sister"
/eː/	/eː/	/eː/	everywhere except gliding to /j/ in clusters: /ɒː/	/o/	/o/	PIE *meh₁ kʷe > LPA *måts > Alb mos "don't"
/oː/	/oː/	/oː/	/we/	/e/	/e/	PIE *bʰloh₁ros > EPA blōra + *-tāi > Alb blertë "green"
/iː/	/iː/	/iː/	/iː/	/i/	/i/	PIE *peh₃- "to drink" > EPA *pīja > Alb pi "to drink" (OAlb pii)
/uː/	/uː/	/uː/	/ui/	/y/	/y/, /i/ in certain conditions	PIE *suHsós > EPA *sūsa > > Alb gjysh "grandfather"
/uː/	/uː/	/uː/	/wi/ > /iː/ at word coda after loss of nominative final s	/i/	/i/	PIE *súHs "pig" > EPA *sūs > *tsūs > LPA *tθui > Alb thi "pig"
/uː/	/uː/	/uː/	/wi/ > /iː/ after labial	/i/	/i/	PIE *bʰuH- "to grow" > EPA *em- + *būnja > Alb mbij "to thrive"
/uː/	/uː/	/uː/	/wi/ > /i/ before labial	/i/	/i/	PIE *kroupeh₂ > EPA *krūpā > LPA *kruipa > Alb kripë "salt"
/uː/	/uː/	/uː/	/wi/ > /i/ before j, i, other palatal elements	/i/	/i/	PIE *dóru "tree" > EPA *drūnjā > Alb drinjë "brushwood"
/ai/	/ai/	/ai/	> /ẽ/ > /ɑ̃/ before nasal	/ə/ <ë>	/ɑ̃/ <â, an>	PIE *leh₁d- > EPA *laidna > Alb lë "to let" (Gheg lâ)
/ai/	/ai/	/ai/	/e/	/e/	/e/	PIE *h₂éydʰos > EPA *aida > Alb ethe "fever"
/ei/	/ei/	/ei/	/i/	/i/	/i/	PIE *ǵʰéymn̥ "winter" > EPA *deimena > Alb dimër "winter" (Gheg dimën)
Unstressed /ei/ in Latin loans				/e/	/e/	Lat dēbitūram > Alb detyrë "duty"
/oi/	/oi/					PIE *ḱleytéh₂ > EPA *klaitā > Alb qetë "jagged rock"
Diphthongs of long vowel + *j	*j elided, long vowel develops regularly					
/au/	/au/	/au/	>/ɑ̃/ before nasals	/ə/ <ë>	/ɑ̃/ <â, an>	PIE *drew- "strong" > EPA *draunjā > Alb drënjë
/au/	/au/	/au/	/a/	/a/	/a/	PIE *h₂ewg- > EPA *auga > Alb ag "dawn"
/au/	/au/	/au/	/a/ > /e/	/e/	/e/	PIE *h₂ewsros > EPA *ausra > Alb err "darkness"
/ou/	/ou/	/au/	/a/	/a/	/a/	PIE *powyos > EPA *pauja > Alb pah "scab, dust"
/ou/	/ou/	/au/	/a/ > /e/	/e/	/e/	EPA *gaura > Alb ger "squirrel"
/eu/	/eu/	/eu/	> /ẽ/ > /ɑ̃/ before nasal	/ə/ <ë>	/ɑ̃/ <â, an>	PIE *h₁néwn̥ "nine" > EPA *neunti > Alb nëntë "nine" (Gheg nand)
/eu/	/eu/	/eu/	/e/	/e/	/e/	PIE *skéwdeti "to throw" > EPA *skeuda > Alb hedh "to throw"

=== Sonorants ===
The nasal sonorants *n̥ and *m̥ both rendered Early Proto-Albanian *a, which remains *a in modern Albanian (PIE *ǵʰh₂éns 'goose' > EPA *gatā > Alb gatë 'heron'). Like EPA *a elsewhere, in some cases it was raised to *e, as seen in PIE *h₁ln̥gʷʰtós > EPA *lekta > Albanian lehtë (suffixed with -të).

Diachronic development of sonorants
Proto-Indo-European	Intermediate developments	Early Proto-Albanian	Later Proto-Albanian	Old Albanian	Tosk Albanian	Gheg Albanian	Example
*m̥		*a	continue regular developments of *a from EPA in vowel chart.				PIE *septḿ̥ "seven" > EPA *septati > Alb shtatë "seven"
*n̥		*a	continue regular developments of *a from EPA in vowel chart.				PIE *dl̥h₁gʰós "long" > EPA *dlakta > Alb gjatë "long"
*l̥		*il before consonant clusters, *i or *j			il, li		
*l̥		*ul elsewhere			ul, lu		
*r̥		*ir before consonant clusters, *i or *j			ir, ri		
*r̥		*ur elsewhere			ur, ru		
*l		*l	*l	*l	l	l	PIE *logʰ- "to lay" > EPA *laga > Alb lag "troop"
*l		*l	*l	*λ (ly/-li)?	j l (Cham/Arbëresh/Arvanitika)	j	PIE *gl̥seh₂ > EPA *gulsā > *gluxa > Alb gjuhë "tongue" (Arb/Arv gljuhë); Lat mīlia > Alb mijë "thousand" (Cha milë)
*l		*l	*ɫ (V_V)	*ɫ	ll /γ/ (some Arbëresh) /ð/ (some Lab)	ll /ð/ (some dialects)	PIE *skōlos > EPA *skōla > Alb hell "skewer"
*r		*r	*r (V_V)	*r	r	r	PIE *meyh₁reh₂ "peace" > EPA *meirā > Alb mirë "good"
*r		*r	*r (V_V)	*λ (-ri)?	j	j	EPA *birai > *biri > Alb bij "sons"
*r		*r	*r: (#_)	*r:	rr	rr	EPA *redza > Alb rrjedh "to flow" < PIE *h₃reǵ-
*m		*m	*m		m	m	PIE *méh₂treh₂ "mother's sister" > EPA mātrā > Alb motër "sister"
*n		*n	*n		n r (-n-)	n ng /ŋ/ (from /ng/)	PIE *nókʷts "night" > EPA naktā > Alb natë "night"
*n		*n	*n: (*-sn-, *-Cn-, *-nC-)		n n (-n-)	n ng /ŋ/ (from /ng/)	PIE *h₂ewksneh₂ > EPA *auksnā > Alb anë "vessel" (dialectal)
*n		*n	*/ɲ/ (*gn-, before front vowels)		nj	nj ni ~ n (northern)	PIE *h₂nḗr "man" > EPA nera > Alb njeri "man" (OAlb njer)

=== Consonants ===
EPA Consonants
	Labial	Dental	Alveolar	Palatal	Velar
Nasal	*m	*n			
Plosive	*p *b	*t *d	*ts *dz	*t͡ʃ *d͡ʒ	*k *g
Fricative			*s *z		*x
Glide	*w			*j	
Lateral			*l		
Trill			*r		

LPA Consonants
	Labial	Dental	Alveolar	Palatal	Velar
Nasal	*m	*n			
Plosive	*p *b	*t *d	*ts	*c	*k *g
Affricate				*t͡ʃ	
Fricative	*f	*θ *ð	*s *z	*ʃ	*x
Glide	*w			*j	
Lateral			*l		
Trill			*r		

Diachronic development
Proto-Indo-European	Pre-Proto-Albanian	Early Proto-Albanian	Later Proto-Albanian	Modern Albanian (Tosk/Gheg)	Examples
*s	*s	*z	> *j	ɟ ~ d͡ʒ <gj>	PIE serpenos "snake" > EPA *serpena > Alb gjarpër "snake" (Gheg gjarpën)
*s	*s	*s	> *ʃ after *ī, *ū or -i, -u diphthongs	ʃ <sh>	PIE *dʰowsos > EPA *dauša > Alb dash "ram"
*s	*s	*s	*ʃ word-initially (sometimes)	ʃ <sh>	PIE *suh₂seh₂ > EPA *sūša > Alb shi "rain"
*s	*s	> t͡s (if next consonant was *s)	> *θ	θ <th>	PIE *súHs "pig" > EPA *sūs > *tsūs > LPA *tθui > Alb thi "pig"
*s	*s	>*x intervocalically or between EPA sonorant and vowel		h	PIE *gl̥seh₂ > EPA *gulsā > *gluxa > Alb gjuhë "tongue"
*s	*s	>*x intervocalically or between EPA sonorant and vowel		Ø	PIE nos > EPA *nasa > *naxa > Alb na "us"
*sK	*sK	*sK	*x	h	PIE *skéwdeti "to throw" > EPA *skeuda > Alb hedh "to throw"
*sp-	*sp-	*sp-	f-	f-	PIE *sporeh₂ > EPA *sparā > Alb farë "seed"
*st	*st	*st	ʃt	ʃt	PIE *stóygʰos > EPA *staiga > Alb shteg "path"
*sd *[zd]	*zd	*zd	ð	dh	PIE *písdeh₂ > EPA *pizda > Alb pidh "female pudenda"
*s from Greek, Latin loanwords			*ʃ	ʃ <sh>	Lat summum > Alb shumë "more"
*p	*p	*p	*p	p	PIE *h₁op- "to take" > EPA *apa > Alb jap ("to give") (Gheg jep, ep)
*b, *bʰ	*b	*b	*b	b	PIE *srobʰéyeti "to suck" > EPA *serba > Alb gjerb "to gulp"
*b, *bʰ	*b	*b	*w between a vowel and *u	v	PIE *n̥bʰ(u)los > EPA *abula > Alb avull "steam, vapor"
*t	*t	*t	*t	t	PIE *tréyes > EPA *treje > Alb tre "three"
*d, *dʰ	*d	*d	*d	d	PIE *dʰégʷʰeti > EPA *dega > Alb djeg "to burn"
*d, *dʰ	*d	*d	> *ð intervocalically or between r and vowel, in 5th or 6th centuries	ð <dh>	PIE *skéwdeti "to throw" > EPA *skeuda > Alb hedh "to throw"
*ḱ (*c?)	*ḱ (*c?)	>*t͡s	> *θ	θ <th>	PIE *(ḱi)ḱereh₂ "pea"? > EPA *tserā > Alb thjerë "lentil"
*ḱ (*c?)	*ḱ (*c?)	>*t͡s	> *t͡ʃ > *s before i, j, u, or w	s	PIE *ḱupos "shoulder" > EPA *tsupa > Alb sup "shoulder"; PIE *ḱyeh₂ dh₂itéy "this day" > EPA *tsjādīti > Alb sot "today"
*ḱ (*c?)	*ḱ (*c?)	>*t͡s	*t͡s retained, conditions unclear	t͡s <c>	PIE *h₂ḱrós "sharp" > EPA *atsara > Alb acar "cold" (but Alb athët "tart")
*ḱ (*c?)	*ḱ (*c?)	>*t͡s	> *t͡ʃ, conditions unclear	t͡ʃ <ç>	PIE *ḱentrom "point" > EPA *štšentra > Alb çandër "prop"
*ḱ (*c?)	*ḱ (*c?)	> *k before sonorant	*k	k	PIE *smóḱwr̥ > EPA *smekrā > Alb mjekër "beard"
*ǵ, *ǵʰ (*ɟ?)	*ǵ (*ɟ?)	*dz	*ð	dh	PIE *ǵómbʰos > EPA *dzamba > Alb dhëmb "tooth" (Gheg dhamb)
*ǵ, *ǵʰ (*ɟ?)	*ǵ (*ɟ?)	*dz ~ d?	*ð ~ d?	d	PIE *ǵʰēsreh₂ > EPA *dēsrā > *dāsrā > Alb dorë "hand"
*ǵ, *ǵʰ (*ɟ?)	*ǵ (*ɟ?)	*d͡ʒ before w	*z	z	PIE *ǵʰwonos > EPA *džwana > Alb zë "voice" (Gheg zâ)
*k	*k	*k	*k	k	PIE *kápmi "I seize" > EPA *kapmi > Alb kam "to have"
*k	*k	*k	*c (palatalised)	q	PIE *ḱlew- "to hear" > EPA *klaunja > Alb qaj "to cry" (OAlb klanj)
*g, *gʰ	*g	*g	*g	g	PIE *gʰórdʰos > EPA *garda > Alb gardh "fence"
*g, *gʰ	*g	*g	*j (palatalised)	gj	PIE *gʰed- > EPA *gadnja > Alb gjej "to find" (Gheg gjêj)
*kʷ	*kʷ?	*t͡ʃ before front vowels	*s	s	PIE *kʷéleti "to turn" > EPA *tšela > Alb sjell "to bring"
*kʷ	*kʷ?	*k elsewhere	*k	k	PIE *pékʷeti "to cook" > EPA *peka > Alb pjek "to bake"
*kʷ	*kʷ?	*k elsewhere	*c (palatalised)	q	PIE *kʷóy > EPA *kai > Alb që "that, which (relative)"
*gʷ, *gʷʰ	*gʷ?	*d͡ʒ(w) before front vowels	*z	z	PIE *gʷerh₃- "to swallow" > EPA *džērnā > *džārnā > Alb zorrë "bowels"
*gʷ, *gʷʰ	*gʷ?	*g elsewhere	*g	g	PIE *dʰégʷʰeti > EPA *dega > Alb djeg "to burn"
*gʷ, *gʷʰ	*gʷ?	*g elsewhere	*j (palatalised)	gj	PIE *gwosdis "wood" > EPA *gwazdi > Alb gjeth "leaf"
*y	*j	*z (#_V)	*j	gj	PIE *yémos > EPA *jama > Alb gjem "bridle"
*y	*j	Ø (V_V)	Ø	Ø	PIE *tréyes > EPA *treje > Alb tre "three"
*w	*w	*w (#_V)	*w	v	PIE *woséyeti > EPA *wesja > Alb vesh "to dress"
*w	*w	Ø (V_V)	Ø	Ø	PIE *h₁widʰéwh₂ > EPA *widewā > Alb ve "widow"

=== Dorsal consonants ===
Indo-European languages are traditionally divided into two groups based on the development of the three series of dorsal (often called "guttural") stops, viz. the palatal (*ḱ *ǵ *ǵʰ), velar (*k *g *gʰ) and labiovelar (*kʷ *gʷ *gʷʰ) series. In the "centum" languages (e.g. Italic languages, Germanic languages, Greek) the palatal series has merged with velar series, while the labiovelar series remained distinct; whereas in the "satem" languages (Indo-Iranian languages, Balto-Slavic languages), the labiovelars merged with the plain velars, while the palatals shifted to sibilant consonants.

Many Indo-Europeanists have classified Albanian as a satem language since it has dental fricatives /θ/ and /ð/ as the common reflex of the palatal series, while velar and labiovelar stops in most cases have merged. However, there is clear evidence that all three IE dorsal series remained distinct (at least before front vowels) in Proto-Albanian:

- *ḱ > /θ/, *ǵ/*ǵʰ > /ð/
- *k > /k/, *g/*gʰ > /g/
- *kʷ > /s/ (before high vowels), /k/ (elsewhere); *gʷ/*gʷʰ > /z/ (before high vowels), /g/ elsewhere.

In the later phonological history of Albanian, the velars /k/ and /g/ were subject to further palatalizations.

The (partial) retention of the Proto-IE three-way contrast for dorsal stops is an archaic feature that links Albanian with the wider Paleo-Balkanic group and is shared with Messapic and Armenian.

== Grammar ==
=== Verbs ===
Verbs in Early Proto-Albanian (Early PA) and contemporary Albanian are divided into thematic verbs and athematic verbs, thus following this division from Proto-Indo-European (PIE).

PA *-a in the first person singular of the present cannot come from PIE *-oh₂, since its reflex in Proto-Albanian would be *-e (if stressed) or *-ë (if unstressed). Therefore, *-a comes from dialectal PIE *-om.

The second and third person singular come from PIE *-esi, *-eti with the loss of PIE final *-i already occurred in pre-Albanian.

The second person plural has no reflex from PA but it was shaped later, between the passage from PA to Old Albanian; the modern ending -ni could come from *nū, a PA adverb meaning "now", identical to PIE *nū and Sanskrit nū; otherwise, it derives from the nasal verbal stem -nj- with a final *-i coming from the PA personal pronoun *jus 'you (all)'.

Most verb stems ending in a closed diphthong (-aj, -ej, -ij, -oj, -uj, -yj) in the singular come from a nasal stem in PA, ending in *-Cnj- or *-Vnj- (e.g., first person singular *-nja)-

As for the third person plural, the PIE thematic vowel *-o- mutates into PA *-i- perhaps due to the influence of the /i̯/ from the verbs in -oj- in the plural.

Most Latin (Classical Latin, Late Latin, Vulgar Latin) verbs belonging to the first declension (infinite -āre) were adapted into stems ending with PA *-ānj- (first person singular *-ānja > Old Gheg -onj > modern Albanian -oj) and, in rarer cases (usually verbal roots ending in liquids, hence -lāre and -rāre), with PA *-enj- (> modern -ej-). An example is modern këndoj < Latin cantāre, which points to a hypothetical PA ~*kandānj- (first person singular ~*kandānja). Another example is shëmbëllej < Late Latin similāre.

Most Latin verbs belonging to the second declension (infinite -ēre) were adapted into stems ending with -oj- and PA *-enj-.

Most Latin verbs belonging to the third declension(unstressed and short infinite -ere) were adapted into stems ending with PA *-ānj- > modern -oj- and, in rarer cases, with -ej-. An example is modern fërgoj < Vulgar Latin frīgĕre.

Most Latin verbs belonging to the fourth declension (infinite -īre) were adapted into stems ending with PA *-inj- (> modern -ij-) and, in rarer cases, with -ej-. An example is modern vij < Old Gheg vijn < Latin venīre.

Most Proto-Slavic verbs ending in *-iti /i:ti:/ in the infinite were adapted into stems ending with PA *-itj- (first person singular *-itja > modern -is; the consonant /t/ was probably weakened to /s/ and the final /a/ was unstressed and thus lost). An example is molis < LPA *melitja < PSL *mъdьliti /mudi'li:ti:/, 'to debilitate/weaken'.

Most Proto-Slavic verbs ending in *-ati /a:ti:/ in the infinitive were adapted into stems ending with PA *-atj- (first person singular *-atja > modern -as).

The remaining Proto-Slavic verbs were adapted into stems ending with *-itj- (> modern -is, -it).

The following examples, except for kap and jap, are all in Old Gheg, a dialect of Old Albanian, and show the verb declension in Old Albanian to trace an idea of the passage between PIE morphology and Proto-Albanian, which then evolved into Old Albanian:

- Standard Albanian kap < PA *kapa < PIE *kh₂pyéti means "to seize"
- Standard Albanian jap < earlier ap < PA *apa; participle dhënë (Gheg dhanë < ; suppletive/eteroclytic verb)
- Standard Albanian kujtoj (Old Gheg kujtonj, earlier kultonj < Proto-Albanian *kugitānja < perhaps Latin cōgitō 1° declension) means "to recall";
- di < PA *dīja < PIE *dʰeyh₂- means "to know";
- hjek (Tosk/Standard Albanian heq < earlier helq) < Proto-Albanian *(w)alkja < PIE causative *h₂wolkéyeti means "to pull out, to remove";
- përkas < verb prek < PA *praka means "to touch"

kap (Standard Albanian)
Pronoun	Verb (present)
I	kap < PA *kapa < pre-Alb. *kapom < dialectal PIE *kh₂pyóm ( < *-óh₂)
You	kap < *kape(s) < pre-Alb. *kapes < *kh₂pyési
He, she, it	kap < *kapet < *kh₂pyéti
We	kapim < PA *kapame(s) < pre-Alb. *kapome(s) < *kapyómos
You (all)	kapni < *kapesnū/kape(s)ju < *kapyéte
They	kapin < PA *kapanti < pre-Alb. *kaponti < *kapyónti

kujtonj (Old Gheg), from Latin cōgitāre
Pronoun	Verb (present)
I	(Standard Albanian kujtoj < ) kujtonj < kultonj < *kugitānja < cōgitō
You	kujton < *kugitānje(s)? < cōgitās
He, she, it	kujton < *kugitānjet? < cōgitat
We	kujtojmë < *kugitānjame(s)? < cōgitāmus
You (all)	kujtoni < *kugitānjesnū/kugitānje(s)ju? < cōgitātis
They	kujtonjënë < *kugitānjanti? < cōgitant

di (Old Gheg)
Pronoun	Verb (present)
I	dī < *dīja < *dʰeyh₂- (*dʰeyh₂yoh₂?)
You	di
He, she, it	di
We	dīmë
You	dini
They	dīnë

hjek (Old Gheg)
Pronoun	Verb (present)
I	hjek < early Tosk *(w)alkja < Pre-Alb. *(w)alkjom? < (dialectal *h₂wolkéyom?) < *h₂wolkéyoh₂
You	hjek < *(w)alkje(s)? < Pre-Alb. *(w)alkjes < *h₂wolkéyesi
He, she, it	hjek < *(w)alkjet? < *h₂wolkéyeti
We	hjekmë < *(w)alkjame(s)? < *(w)alkjome(s)? < *h₂wolkéyomos
You (all)	hiqëni < *(w)alkjesnū/(w)alke(s)ju? < *h₂wolkéyote
They	hjekënë < *(w)alkjanti? < *(w)alkjonti? < *h₂wolkéyonti

përkas (Old Gheg)
Pronoun	Verb (present)
I	përkas < prek < *praka
You	përket
He, she, it	përket
We	përkasmë
You (all)	përkitëni
They	përkasënë

The verb "to be" (jam < PA *esmi < PIE *h₁ésmi ), as in PIE, is athematic and has a nasal infix *-n- in the third person singular and plural; perhaps, this infix is taken from the original third person plural in PIE, *-enti. PA had two more athematic verbs, kam ('to have' < PA *kapmi < Latin capiō) which is cognate with thematic kap < PA *kapa < PIE *kh₂pyóh₂, and thom ('to say' < PA *tsānsmi < Latin cēnseō). Probably, PA had a fourth athematic verb, ik ('to go') < PA *eika < earlier *eimi (identical to Ancient Greek), but then it was transformed into a thematic verb through the stem of the imperative.

jam (Old Gheg)
Pronoun	Verb (present)	Comment
I	jam < *esmi < PIE *h₁ésmi	The mutation *e > *a is regular and still preserved in Old Gheg and Standard Albanian
You	je < *essi < *h₁ési	The mutation *e > *a, preserved in Old Gheg, is not found since this stem is conservative respect to PIE
He, she, it	ashtë < *ensti < *h₁ésti	The mutation *e > *a is regular and still preserved in Old Gheg but not in Standard Albanian (*a > regularly reduce to ë)
We	jemi < *esmei < *h₁é-, *h₁smós	The stem is based on "je"
You (all)	ini < essinū/essiju < *h₁é-, *h₁sté	The stem is based on "je"; in Standard Albanian, this is more evident since the verb form is "jeni"
They	janë < *esnti < *h₁é-, *h₁sénti	The stem is based on "jane"; an analogous phenomenon is in Romanian: "I am - they are" > "eu sunt - ei sunt"

The last verb, vete(m) in Standard Albanian, has two historical versions: an original version from PIE and a later version which culminates into the contemporary version. The original versions in Early PA and PA are the direct reflex of athematic PIE *weh₂dʰ-, perhaps *weh₂dʰmi; then, the pre-modern version in Late PA is a reworked version that fuses the original version in PA and the suffix *-te, originally the preposition "to", *tek(u) (< PIE neuter demonstrative *to-, "this/that" < PIE *só).

*vemte (Tosk Albanian)
Pronoun	Verb
I	vetem (Tosk)/vete (Gheg) < Late PA *vemte < PA *vem < Early PA *wadmi < PIE *weh₂dʰmi?
You	vete < *vete < *ve < *wadesi < *weh₂dʰsi?
He, she, it	vete < *vette < *vet < *wadeti < *weh₂dʰti?
We	vemi < ? < Early PA *wadmei < *weh₂dʰmos?
You (all)	venë < ? < *weh₂dʰté?
They	vendosin < ? < *weh₂dʰénti?

The asigmatic aorist conjugation is based on the athematic paradygm and has a mobile accent perhaps due to the augmentation, which consists in the prefix *e-. The same structure can be found in Greek. In contemporary Albanian, the augmentation prefix is lost. In the third person singular, the ending *-i should come from PA and PIE personal/demonstrative pronoun *is.

The sigmatic aorist conjugation is based on the athematic paradygm as well and zero-grade in morphology is explained by the influence of the participles in PA.

The endings of the imperfect originally come from the endings of the asigmatic aorist; at a later stage, the original vowel *-e- changed into *-i-.

kap (Standard Albanian)
Pronoun	Verb (asigmatic aorist)
I	kapa < ekapà < pre-Alb. ekap(o)m
You	kape < ekapè(s) < ekapes
He, she, it	kapi < ekàpet
We	kapëm < ekapame < ekapome
You	kapët < ekapete
They	kapën < ekapanti < ekaponti

jap (Standard Albanian)
Pronoun	Verb (sigmatic aorist)
I	dhashë < Late PA *(e)ðaśa < PA *edasa < Late PIE *h₁e-dh₃(e)smi
You	dhe < *edō(s) < edōss < *h₁e-dh₃(e)ss
He, she, it	dha < edast < *h₁e-dh₃(e)st
We	dhamë < eda(s)me < *h₁e-dh₃(e)(s)me
You	dhatë < edate < *h₁e-dh₃(e)te
They	dhanë < eda(s)nti < *h₁e-dh₃(e)(s)nti

=== Personal pronouns ===
Pronoun	PIE	Proto-Albanian (nom.)
I	*éǵh₂	*uǵ > *udz
You	*túh₂	*tū
He	*h₁ey + *ís	*aei (*a-ei)
She	*h₁ey + *-éh₂	*ajā (*a-jā)
We	*wéy > *nos	*nōs
You (all)	*yū́(s)	*jus
They (m.)	*h₁ey + [*só > m. acc. plur. *tons]	*ata (*a-ta)
They (f.)	*h₁ey + [*tód > f. nom. plur. *téh₂es]	*atā(s) [*a-tā(s)]

=== Nouns ===
Nouns in Proto-Albanian are divided in to *a-stem nouns (< PIE *-os, whence they are also called *o-stem nouns) and *ā-stem nouns (< PIE *-éh₂). There was a third group of nouns in Early PA, the *i-stem nouns (e.g., natë 'night' < PA *naktā < PIE *nókʷts), which then merged into *o-stem nouns.

There are 5 cases (2 strong cases and 2 weak cases): nominative, genitive, dative, accusative and ablative, with a strong degree of syncretism among cases. PIE locative, vocative and instrumental were lost.

Contemporary Albanian has a vocative case -o for both masculine and feminine names:this vocative was borrowed from South Slavic languages (Serbo-Croatian, Macedonian, Bulgarian) since, in Proto-Slavic, the feminine vocative became *-o, which is an innovation from PIE *-éh₂.

==== Masculine indefinite ====
*a-stem nouns had a final *-a in the strong cases (nominative and accusative), reflecting PIE *-o-; since this final *-a was unstressed in most cases, it was lost in contemporary Albanian. Hence, today most of masculine words in the strong cases end in consonants except for some false feminine words ending in -ë. The two strong cases already merged into a single ending in the singular in Early PA, while the three weak cases already converged into a single ending in the singular as well. The ending was either *-i or *-u; the second one was used after preceding vowels, semi-vowels and velar consonants *k- and *g-. These two endings reflect PIE locative *-éy, but it is unknown if the weak cases already merged in Pre-Albanian. Today, weak cases are distinguished each other by the use of clitics.

In the plural, *a-stem nouns, strong cases ended in *-ō/*-ai. *-ō is the reflex of PIE *-ōs, while *-ai is the reflex of PIE *-oy. Then, in some words, one of the two ending became either fixed or preferred. In the words without preferred ending, stressed *-ō/*-ai developed into contemporary -e and -a (this last ending is the result of an overlap from the feminine declension already in PA in which the expected *-ō/*-ai was substituted by *-ā); in words with preferred ending *-ō (unstressed), it developed into contemporary -ë; in words with preferred ending *-ai (unstressed), it developed into contemporary zero-ending, which means that most of the plural end in consonant.

In the genitive and dative plural, *-ō comes from PIE genitive plural *-ōm (stressed) and culminates into contemporary -e. The other modern ending -eve comes from a modification of PIE genitive plural, *-wōm > PA *-wō;the alternative modern ending -ave comes from a modification of PIE genitive plural *-éh₂wōm through the feminine thematic vowel of the feminine *-éh₂-, thus reflecting the overlap with the feminine in the strong cases.

The ablative plural -esh comes from PA *-aisu, from PIE *-oysu. Ablative in -t is common in North Gheg and it was transferred from the definite declension.

*dama ("young bull", m.), with overlap with feminine
Case	Singular	Plural
Nom.	dem < Early PA *dàma < PIE *dm̥h₂os	dema < Early PA *dàmā < PIE *dm̥h₂ōs
Acc.	dem < *dàma < *dm̥h₂om?	dema < *dàmā < *dm̥h₂oms?
Gen.	demi < *dàmei < *dm̥h₂éy	demave (deme) < *damāwō (*damō) < Late PIE *dm̥éh₂wōm (PIE *dm̥h₂ōm)
Dat.	demi < *dàmei < *dm̥h₂éy	demave (deme) < *damāwō (*damō) < *dm̥éh₂wōm (*dm̥h₂ōm)
Abl.	demi < *dàmei < *dm̥h₂éy	demash < *damaisu < *dm̥h₂oysu

*delà ("boy", m.)
Case	Singular	Plural
Nom.	djalë < Early PA *delà < PIE *dʰh₁ilós	djem < Early PA *delō/ai < PIE *dʰh₁ilōs
Acc.	djalë < *delà < *dʰh₁ilóm?	djem < *delō/ai < *dʰh₁iloms?
Gen.	djali < *delei < *dʰeh₁léy	djemve < *delō < Late PIE *dʰh₁ilwōm
Dat.	djali < *delei < *dʰeh₁léy	djemve < *delō < *dʰh₁ilwōm
Abl.	djali *delei < *dʰeh₁léy	djemsh < *delaisu < *dʰh₁iloysu

*źaka ("blood", m.) with velar *-k- (Late PA: *ǵákə)
Case	Singular	Plural
Nom.	gjak < Early PA *źaka < PIE *sokʷós	gjaqe (gjaku) < Early PA *źakō/ài < PIE *sokʷōs
Acc.	gjak < *źaka < *sokʷóm?	gjaqe (gjakun) < *źakō/ài < *sokʷóms?
Gen.	gjaku < *źakei < *sokʷéy	gjakut (North Gheg) < from definite declension
Dat.	gjaku < *źakei < *sokʷéy	gjakut < from definite declension
Abl.	gjaku < *źakei < *sokʷéy	gjakut < from definite declension

==== Feminine indefinite ====
*ā-stem nouns had a final *-ā in the nominative; this vowel was hit by vowel reduction and became -ë, which is the mark of the indefinite feminine words. The two strong cases (nominative and accusative) already merged in Early PA. The plural of all weak cases comes from PA *-āi, which comes from PIE dative-locative *-éh₂i.

The nominative plural *-ā is identical to the nominative singular and comes from PIE *-éh₂s. If the long vowel was stressed, it becomes contemporary Albanian -a, otherwise it becomes contemporary -ë.

The weak cases in PA were copied by analogy from the *a-stem nouns and show the thematic vowel of the feminine, *-éh₂-.

*karpā ("rock", f.)
Case	Singular	Plural
Nom.	karpë < Early PA *karpā < PIE *kerpéh₂	karpa < Early PA *karpā < PIE *kerpéh₂es
Acc.	karpë < *karpā < *kerpéh₂m?	karpa < *karpā < *kerpéh₂m̥s
Gen.	karpeje [(karpe) < *karpāi < *kerpéh₂i]	karpave < *karpāwō < Late PIE *kerpéh₂wōm
Dat.	karpeje [(karpe) < *karpāi < *kerpéh₂i]	karpave < *karpāwō < *kerpéh₂wōm
Abl.	karpeje [(karpe) < *karpāi < *kerpéh₂i]	karpash < *karpāsu < *kerpéh₂su

*(s)parā (seed, f.)
Case	Singular	Plural
Nom.	farë < Early PA *(s)pàrā < PIE *sporéh₂	fara, [farë < *(s)pàrā < *sporéh₂es]
Acc.	farë < *(s)pàrā < *sporéh₂m?	fara < *(s)pàrā < *sporéh₂m̥s?
Gen.	fareje [(fare) < *(s)parāi < *sporéh₂i]	farave < *(s)pàrāwō < Late PIE *sporéh₂wōm
Dat.	fareje [(fare) < *(s)parāi < *sporéh₂i]	farave < *(s)pàrāwō < *sporéh₂wōm
Abl.	fareje [(fare) < *(s)parāi < *sporéh₂i]	farash < *(s)pàrāisu < *sporéh₂su

=== Adjectives ===
In PA adjectival declension, all cases other than the nominative singular and plural were lost. Adjectives in PA had either masculine or feminine gender depending on the gender of the word they refer to. The derivation of adjectives from PIE to Proto-Albanian follows all the rules for indefinite nouns. Masculine adjectives in PA usually ended in *-a in the singular (< PIE *-os), while their feminine counterparts usually ended in *-ā (< PIE *-éh₂); rarely, masculine adjectives ended in *-i. In contemporary Albanian, masculine adjectives can either end in consonant or in -ë (< stressed PA *-a).

Adjectives in contemporary Albanian always go in couple with the "adjectival article", a particle always found before the adjective. It's declination in the masculine singular, feminine singular and plural is "i, e, të". The adjectival article in the feminine comes from PA *ō(d) < PIE *ēd ~ *ōd (ablative sg. stem of PIE *ē- ~ *ō-); this particle was most likely a demonstrative.

Adjective (singular)	Meaning
i bardhë < PA *bardzà < PIE *bʰórh₁ǵos e bardhë < PA *bardzā < *bʰórh₁ǵéh₂	White
zi < zëi < PA *džedi < Early PA *gʷedija < PIE *gʷoh₁dʰ(y)os	Black
i blerë < *blōrà < *bʰloh₁ros	Green
*melana < *melh₂nos	Evil
*stanà < *sth₂nós	Standing
i ur < *wàra < *weh₁ros	True
*wījà < *weh₁yos	Twisted
i çalë < *štšalà < *skolós	Lame
i parë < *parà < *peros	First
i madh < *màdza < *méǵh₂os	Big
i fortë < Latin fortis	Strong
i verdhë < Vulgar Latin viridem (nom. viridis)	Yellow

== Numerals ==
Number	PIE	Proto-Albanian
One (1)	*h₁óynos	*ainja
Two (2)	*dwóh₁	*duwō (m.); *duwai (f.)
Three (3)	*tréyes	*treje
Four (4)	*kʷetwóres > obl. *kʷétur-	*kátur
Five (5)	*pénkʷe	*penče
Six (6)	*swéḱs	*seksti
Seven (7)	*septḿ̥	*septati
Eight (8)	*(h₁)oḱtṓw	*aktṓ
Nine (9)	*h₁néwn̥	*neunti-
Ten (10)	*déḱm̥(t)	*detsa

== Classification ==
The closest language to Albanian is Messapic, with which it forms a common branch titled Illyric in Hyllested & Joseph (2022). Hyllested & Joseph (2022) in agreement with recent bibliography identify Greco-Phrygian as the IE branch closest to the Albanian-Messapic one. These two branches form an areal grouping – which is often called "Balkan IE" – with Armenian. Hyllested & Joseph (2022) identify the highest shared number of innovations between (Proto-)Albanian and (Proto-)Greek.

Innovative creations of agricultural terms shared only between Albanian and Greek, such as *h2(e)lbh-it- 'barley' and *spor-eh2- 'seed', were formed from non-agricultural Proto-Indo-European roots through semantic changes to adapt them for agriculture. Since they are limited only to Albanian and Greek, they can be traced back with certainty only to their last common Indo-European ancestor, and not projected back into Proto-Indo-European. A remarkable Greek/Albanian isogloss is a very ancient form for "hand": *mər-, cf. the Albanian verb marr 'hold' and the Greek márē 'hand', and also Greek márptō 'grab'

A common Balkan Indo-European root *aiğ(i)- 'goat' can be reflected in Albanian edh 'goat, kid' < PAlb *aidza and dhi 'nanny goat' < PAlb *aidzijɑ̄ with Greek αἴξ (aíx 'goat', gen. αἰγός aigós) and Armenian ayc '(nanny) goat'. It has been noted that the Balkan IE root and all the alleged Balto-Slavic and Indo-Iranian roots with a meaning "goat" are likely to be not Proto-Indo-European, as they may all originate as independent and relatively early, post-PIE borrowings, from the substrate languages spoken by the sedentary farmers who were encountered by immigrating Indo-European pastoralists. The view of a substrate borrowing can be corroborated by areal words for 'goat' in other IE languages, such as Gothic gaits 'goat' and Latin haedus 'kid', reflecting *gʰaid̯(-o)-, considered as a substrate word usually linked with Semitic languages (cf. Akkadian gadû, Aramaic gaδiā 'kid'. However it was most likely not directly borrowed from Semitic, but from a European substrate language that in turn had loaned the word from a common third source. Hence it can be viewed as an old cultural word, which was slowly transmitted to different European languages, and then adopted by the newcoming Indo-European speakers. Within this scenario it should be remarked the exclusive sharing of a common proto-form between Albanian, Greek, and Armenian, which could have been borrowed at a pre-stage that was common to these languages.

Shortly after they had diverged from one another, Albanian, Greek, and Armenian, undoubtedly also underwent a longer period of contact (as can be seen, for example, in the irregular correspondence: Greek σκόρ(ο)δον, Armenian sxtor, xstor, and Albanian hudhër, hurdhë 'garlic'. Furthermore, intense Greek–Albanian contacts certainly have occurred thereafter. An example of secondary derivations from Palaeo-Balkan linguistic contacts is the Thracian word σπίνος spínos 'a kind of stone, which blazes when water touches it' (i.e., 'lime'), attested in Aristotle and Theophrastus, with cognate Greek τίτανος (Attic) and κίττανος (Doric) 'gypsum, chalk, lime', stemming from PIE *k̑witn̥Hos 'white, whitish': although from the same PIE root, Albanian shpâ(ni) 'lime, tartar' and Greek σπίνος 'lime' derive from a secondary origin as they were probably borrowed from Thracian due to phonetic reasons. Indeed, the original IE cluster *k̑w- yields Albanian s- before any vowel, while in Thracian it could yield sp-.

Specifically Indo-Iranian/Greek/Albanian and Greek/Armenian/Albanian isoglosses are both relatively rare, examples including ndaj ('to divide'; Indo-Greek-Albanian) and ëndërr ('dream'; Greek/Armenian/Albanian). Armenian/Albanian isoglosses are considered "insignificant" by Orel. There are a considerable number of Indo-Iranian/Albanian isoglosses, which are notably often connected with horses, horse tending, and milk products.

In older literature, Orel (2000) argues that Albanian has a large number of isoglosses that are common to Albanian, Germanic, Baltic and Slavic, as part of a "North Eastern" lexical grouping, with a large number of these referring to wood or objects made out of wood. Orel (1998) noted 24 isoglosses between Balto-Slavic and Albanian, 48 common words between Baltic and Albanian and 24 between Albanian and Slavic. Hyllested & Joseph (2022) review Orel's common items and argue that a substantial number don't have convincing etymologies or do not constitute isoglosses between Balto-Slavic and Albanian. An example is Albanian murg 'dark' and Lithuanian margas 'colourful' which Orel considers to be isoglosses but both are equally related to Proto-Germanic *murkaz, ancient Greek ἀμορβός amorbos and Proto-Slavic *mergъ.

Orel identifies only one Albanian/Italic/Celtic isogloss, blertë 'green', cognate to Latin flōrus 'bright' and Irish blár 'gray'. Specifically Celtic/Albanian vocabulary was previously thought to be limited although including at least one core vocabulary item (hënë 'moon', cognate to Welsh cann 'white' and Breton cann 'full moon'), but recent work by Trumper in 2018 has proposed a larger though still not overwhelming set, with the notable addition of dritë 'light'.

Although knowledge of Tocharian is fragmentary, the one known Albanian/Tocharian isogloss is "very important" as noted by Orel: kush ('who', cognate to Tocharian A kus, with the same meaning).
