= Paleo-Balkan languages =

Geographical grouping of Indo-European languages

The Paleo-Balkan languages are a geographical grouping of various Indo-European languages that were spoken in the Balkans and surrounding areas in ancient times. In antiquity, Dacian, Greek, Illyrian, Messapic, Paeonian, Phrygian and Thracian were the Paleo-Balkan languages which were attested in literature. They may have included other unattested languages.

Paleo-Balkan studies are obscured by the scarce attestation of these languages outside of Ancient Greek and, to a lesser extent, Messapic and Phrygian. Although linguists consider each of them to be a member of the Indo-European family of languages, the internal relationships are still debated. A Palaeo-Balkanic or Balkanic Indo-European branch has been proposed in recent research, comprising the Albanoid or Illyric (Albanian–Messapic), Armenian, and Graeco-Phrygian (Hellenic–Phrygian) subbranches. Regardless of the name, there is no direct evidence to support the location for the hypothetical common ancestor of these languages in the Balkan peninsula itself. Τhe common stage between the Late Proto-Indo-European dialects of Pre-Albanian, Pre-Armenian, and Pre-Greek, is considered to have occurred in the Late Yamnaya period, after the westward migrations of Early Yamnaya across the Pontic–Caspian steppe; also remaining in the western steppe for a prolonged period of time, separated from the Indo-European dialects that later gave rise to the Corded Ware and Bell Beaker cultures in Europe.

Due to the processes of Hellenization, Romanization and Slavicization in the Balkans, the only surviving representatives of the ancient languages of the region are Greek and Albanian. The Albanian language evolved from either Illyrian, often supported for obvious geographic and historical reasons as well as for some fragmentary linguistic evidence, or an unmentioned language that was closely related to Illyrian and Messapic.

== Classification ==
- Proto-Indo-European
  - 'Albanoid', 'Albanic', 'Illyric', 'Illyrian complex', 'Western Paleo-Balkan', or 'Adriatic Indo-European'
    - Albanian
    - Messapic
    - (?) Illyrian
      - Illyrian proper (or Southeast Dalmatian)
      - Central Dalmatian (or Dalmatian–Pannonic)
      - (?) Liburnian
  - (?) Daco-Thracian ('Daco-Thraco-Moesian complex')
    - Thracian
    - (?) Daco-Moesian
      - Dacian, Moesian and Getic
  - Armenian
  - Graeco-Phrygian
    - Hellenic
      - Arcadocypriot Greek
      - Attic–Ionic Greek
        - Attic Greek
          - Koine Greek
            - Medieval Greek
              - Modern Greek
      - Aeolic Greek
      - Doric Greek
        - Doric proper
          - Tsakonian Greek
        - Northwest Doric
          - (?) Ancient Macedonian (Note: The classification of ancient Macedonian is disputed. The placement shown here follows the reading of it as a Northwest Doric dialect; other scholars treat it as a closely related language placed alongside Greek proper within the Hellenic branch. See the "Subgrouping hypotheses" section below.)
    - Phrygian
      - (?) Mysian
  - (?) Paeonian

=== Subgrouping hypotheses ===
Illyrian is a group of Indo-European languages whose relationship to other Indo-European languages as well as to the languages of the Paleo-Balkan group, many of which might be offshoots of Illyrian, is poorly understood due to the paucity of data and is still being examined. The centum or satem character of Illyrian is difficult to detect due to the paucity of the available 'Illyrian' linguistic material and to the dual nature of its interpretation. Today, the only sources of information about the Illyrian language consist of a handful of Illyrian words cited in classical sources, and numerous examples of Illyrian anthroponyms, ethnonyms, toponyms and hydronyms.

Messapian was spoken on the Italian peninsula, but is generally regarded an offshoot from the Paleo-Balkan language area. A grouping of Messapian with Illyrian has been proposed for about a century, but remains an unproven hypothesis due to the fragmentary attestation of Illyrian. The theory is based on classical sources, archaeology, as well as onomastic considerations. Messapian material culture bears a number of similarities to Illyrian material culture. Some Messapian anthroponyms have close Illyrian equivalents.

A grouping of Illyrian with Venetic and Liburnian, once spoken in northeastern Italy and Liburnia respectively, is also proposed. The consensus now is that Illyrian was quite distinct from Venetic and Liburnian, but a close linguistic relation has not been ruled out and is still being investigated. Philistine had been linked to many different Indo-European languages: a pre-Greek substrate of the Pelasgians (by Milan Budimir), Mycenaean Greek, and Illyrian but these theories are mostly speculation.

Another hypothesis would group Illyrian with Dacian and Thracian into a Thraco-Illyrian branch, and a competing hypothesis would exclude Illyrian from a Daco-Thracian grouping in favor of Mysian. The classification of Thracian itself is a matter of contention and uncertainty.

The place of Paeonian remains unclear. Not much has been determined in the study of Paeonian, and some linguists do not recognize a Paeonian area separate from Illyrian or Thracian.

The Phrygian language is considered to have been most likely the closest relative of Greek.

Claude Brixhe and other scholars, based on epigraphic evidence such as the Pella curse tablet, suggest that ancient Macedonian was a Northwest Doric dialect. Other scholars like Brian Joseph, classify it as a closely related language, placed alongside Greek proper within the Hellenic branch.

== Balkanic Indo-European ==
- Balkanic
  - Armenian
  - Graeco-Albanian
    - Graeco-Phrygian
      - Greek
      - Phrygian
        (extinct)
    - "Illyric"
      - Messapic
        (extinct)
      - Albanian

The Palaeo-Balkanic Indo-European branch based on the chapter "Albanian" (Hyllested & Joseph 2022) in Olander (ed.) The Indo-European Language Family

While "Paleo-Balkan" languages are conventionally understood as a linguistic areal grouping, in recent historical linguistic research scholars propose a distinct "Balkanic" (or "Paleo-Balkanic") Indo-European branch based on shared Indo-European morphological, lexical, and phonetic innovations, as well as shared lexical proto-forms from a common pre-Indo-European substratum. The Balkanic subgroup comprises three branches of modern and well-attested ancient languages, viz. Armenian, Graeco-Phrygian (= Hellenic + Phrygian) and "Illyric" (= Albanian + Messapian). Some scholars further propose that innovations exclusively shared by Greek and Albanian point to a closer link between the latter two branches, which can thus be unified to a "Graeco-Albanian" branch.

Shared innovations include the first person singular mediopassive ending *-mai, and lexical innovations such as *ai̯ĝ- 'goat', dʰeh_{1}s- 'god'. The word for "goat" is a remarkable common proto-form of non-Indo-European origin exclusively shared between Albanian, Armenian, and Greek. It could have been borrowed at a pre-stage that was common to these languages from a pre-Indo-European substrate language that in turn had loaned the word from a third source, from which the pre-IE substrate of the proto-form that is shared between Balto-Slavic and Indo-Iranian could also have borrowed it. Hence it can be viewed as an old cultural word, which was slowly transmitted to two different pre-Indo-European substrate languages, and then independently adopted by two groups of Indo-European speakers, reflecting a post-Proto-Indo-European linguistic and geographic separation between the "Balkanic" group consisting of Albanian, Armenian, and Greek, and a group to the North of the Black Sea consisting of Balto-Slavic and Indo-Iranian.

A remarkable PIE root that underwent in Albanian, Armenian, and Greek a common evolution and semantic shift in the post PIE period is PIE *mel-i(t)- 'honey', from which Albanian bletë, Armenian mełu, and Greek μέλισσα (mélissa) or μέλιττα (mélitta) 'bee' derived. However, the Armenian term features -u- through the influence of the PIE *médʰu 'mead', which constitutes an Armenian innovation that isolates it from the Graeco-Albanian word. Innovative creations of agricultural terms shared only between Albanian and Greek were formed from non-agricultural PIE roots through semantic changes to adapt them for agriculture. Since they are limited only to Albanian and Greek, they could be traced back with certainty only to their last common IE ancestor, and not projected back into Proto-Indo-European.

== See also ==
- Balkan sprachbund
- Graeco-Armenian
- Origin of the Albanians
- Paleo-Balkan mythology
- Prehistory of Southeastern Europe
- Armeno-Phrygians

== Sources ==
- Baldi, Benedetta; Savoia, Leonardo M. (2017). "Cultura e identità nella lingua albanese" [Culture and Identity in the Albanian Language]. LEA – Lingue e Letterature d'Oriente e d'Occidente. 6 (6): 45–77. doi:10.13128/LEA-1824-484x-22325. ISSN 1824-484X.
- Blažek, Václav (2005). "Paleo-Balkanian Languages I: Hellenic Languages" (PDF). Sborník prací Filozofické fakulty brněnské univerzity. Vol. 10. Brno: Masarykova univerzita. pp. 15–33. ISBN 80-210-3784-9.
- Brixhe, Claude (2017). "Macedonian". In Klein, Jared; Joseph, Brian; Fritz, Matthias (eds.). Handbook of Comparative and Historical Indo-European Linguistics. Vol. 3. Walter de Gruyter. ISBN 978-3-11-054243-1.
- Coretta, Stefano; Riverin-Coutlée, Josiane; Kapia, Enkeleida; Nichols, Stephen (16 August 2022). "Northern Tosk Albanian". Journal of the International Phonetic Association. 53 (3): 1122–1144. doi:10.1017/S0025100322000044. hdl:20.500.11820/ebce2ea3-f955-4fa5-9178-e1626fbae15f.
- Crossland, R.A.; Boardman, John (1982). "Linguistic problems of the Balkan area in the late prehistoric and early Classical period" in The Cambridge Ancient History Volume 3, Part 1. Cambridge University Press. ISBN 978-0-521-22496-3.
- De Simone, Carlo (2017). "Illyrian". In Klein, Jared; Joseph, Brian; Fritz, Matthias (eds.). Handbook of Comparative and Historical Indo-European Linguistics. Vol. 3. Walter de Gruyter. ISBN 978-3-11-054243-1.
- Demiraj, Shaban (2004). "Gjendja gjuhësore e Gadishullit Ballkanik në lashtësi" [The linguistic situation of the Balkan Peninsula in antiquity]. Gjuhësi Ballkanike [Balkan Linguistics] (in Albanian). Academy of Sciences of Albania. ISBN 978-99943-630-0-1.
- Demiraj, Bardhyl (2020). "The Evolution of Albanian". Studia Albanica (2). Academy of Sciences of Albania: 33–40. ISSN 0585-5047.
- Filos, Panagiotis (2023). "Onomastic Formulae from N. Epirus and S. Illyria: Linguistic and Sociocultural Connotations". In Albio Cesare Cassio, Sara Kaczko (ed.). Alloglо̄ssoi: Multilingualism and Minority Languages in Ancient Europe. Trends in Classics – Greek and Latin Linguistics. Vol. 2. Walter de Gruyter GmbH & Co KG. pp. 83–113. ISBN 978-3-11-077968-4.
- Fortson, Benjamin Wynn IV (2010). Indo-European Language and Culture: An Introduction (2nd ed.). Wiley-Blackwell. ISBN 978-1-4443-5968-8.
- Friedman, Victor A. (2000). "After 170 years of Balkan Linguistics: Whither the Millennium?". Mediterranean Language Review. 12. O. Harrassowitz: 1–15. ISSN 0724-7567.
- Friedman, Victor A. (2020). "The Balkans". In Evangelia Adamou, Yaron Matras (ed.). The Routledge Handbook of Language Contact. Routledge Handbooks in Linguistics. Routledge. pp. 385–403. ISBN 978-1-351-10914-7.
- Friedman, Victor (2022). "The Balkans". In Salikoko Mufwene, Anna Maria Escobar (ed.). The Cambridge Handbook of Language Contact: Volume 1: Population Movement and Language Change. Cambridge Handbooks in Language and Linguistics. Cambridge University Press. ISBN 978-1-009-11577-3.
- Friedman, Victor A.; Joseph, Brian D. (2017). "Reassessing Sprachbunds: A View from the Balkans". The Cambridge Handbook of Areal Linguistics. Cambridge Handbooks in Language and Linguistics. Cambridge University Press. pp. 55–87. ISBN 978-1-316-83945-4.
- Hamp, Eric; Adams, Douglas (August 2013). "The Expansion of the Indo-European Languages: An Indo-Europeanist's Evolving View" (PDF). Sino-Platonic Papers. 239.
- Harmatta, János (1967). "Zum Illyrischen". Acta Antiqua Academiae Scientiarum Hungaricae. 15: 231–234.
- Holst, Jan Henrik (2009). Armenische Studien (in German). Otto Harrassowitz Verlag. ISBN 978-3-447-06117-9.
- Huld, Martin E. (1984). Basic Albanian Etymologies. Columbus, OH: Slavica Publishers. ISBN 978-0-89357-135-1.
- Huld, Martin E. (1986). "Accentual Stratification of Ancient Greek Loanwords in Albanian". Zeitschrift für vergleichende Sprachforschung. 99 (2). Vandenhoeck & Ruprecht (GmbH & Co. KG): 245–253. JSTOR 40848841.
- Hyllested, Adam; Joseph, Brian D. (2022). "Albanian". In Olander, Thomas (ed.). The Indo-European Language Family: A Phylogenetic Perspective. Cambridge University Press. pp. 223–245. doi:10.1017/9781108758666.013. ISBN 978-1-108-75866-6. S2CID 161016819.
- Ismajli, Rexhep (2015). Eqrem Basha (ed.). Studime për historinë e shqipes në kontekst ballkanik [Studies on the History of Albanian in the Balkan context] (in Albanian). Prishtinë: Kosova Academy of Sciences and Arts, special editions CLII, Section of Linguistics and Literature.
- Katicic, Radoslav (2012). Ancient Languages of the Balkans. Walter de Gruyter. ISBN 978-3-11-156887-4.
- Krahe, Hans (1929). Lexikon altillyrischen Personennamen. Heidelberg.
- Krahe, Hans (1950). "Das Venetische: seine Stellung im Kreise der verwandten Sprachen". Sitzungsberichte der Heidelberger Akademie der Wissenschaften, Philosophisch-Historische Klasse. 3: 1–37.
- Kroonen, Guus (2012). "Non-Indo-European root nouns in Germanic: evidence in support of the Agricultural Substrate Hypothesis". In Riho Grünthal, Petri Kallio (ed.). A Linguistic Map of Prehistoric Northern Europe. Suomalais-Ugrilaisen Seuran Toimituksia = Mémoires de la Société Finno-Ougrienne. Vol. 266. Société Finno-Ougrienne. pp. 239–260. ISBN 978-952-5667-42-4. ISSN 0355-0230.
- Kroonen, Guus; Jakob, Anthony; Palmér, Axel I.; van Sluis, Paulus; Wigman, Andrew (12 October 2022). "Indo-European cereal terminology suggests a Northwest Pontic homeland for the core Indo-European languages". PLOS ONE. 17 (10) e0275744. Bibcode:2022PLoSO..1775744K. doi:10.1371/journal.pone.0275744. ISSN 1932-6203. PMC 9555676. PMID 36223379.
- Majer, Marek (2019). "Parahistoria indoevropiane e fjalës shqipe për 'motrën'" [Indo-European Prehistory of the Albanian Word for 'Sister']. Seminari Ndërkombëtar për Gjuhën, Letërsinë dhe Kulturën Shqiptare [International Seminar for Albanian Language, Literature and Culture] (in Albanian). 1 (38). University of Prishtina: 252–266. ISSN 2521-3687.
- Mallory, J. P.; Adams, Douglas Q. (1997). Encyclopedia of Indo-European culture. Taylor & Francis. ISBN 978-1-884964-98-5.
- Matasović, Ranko (2019). A Grammatical Sketch of Albanian for Students of Indo European (PDF). Zagreb. p. 39.
- Matzinger, Joachim (2015). "Messapico e illirico". Idomeneo. 19. University of Salento: 57–66. doi:10.1285/i20380313v19p57. ISSN 2038-0313.
- Matzinger, Joachim (2017). "The Lexicon of Albanian". In Klein, Jared; Joseph, Brian; Fritz, Matthias (eds.). Handbook of Comparative and Historical Indo-European Linguistics. Vol. 3. Walter de Gruyter. ISBN 978-3-11-054243-1.
- Nielsen, R. T. (2023). Prehistoric loanwords in Armenian: Hurro-Urartian, Kartvelian, and the unclassified substrate (PhD). Leiden University. hdl:1887/3656151.
- Olsen, Birgit Anette; Thorsø, Rasmus (2022). "Armenian" (PDF). In Olander, Thomas (ed.). The Indo-European Language Family: A Phylogenetic Perspective. Cambridge University Press. pp. 202–222. doi:10.1017/9781108758666.012. ISBN 978-1-108-75866-6. S2CID 161016819.
- Polomé, Edgar Charles (1982). "Balkan Languages (Illyrian, Thracian and Daco-Moesian)". Cambridge Ancient History. Vol. III.1. pp. 866–888.
- Parpola, Asko (2012). "Formation of the Indo-European and Uralic (Finno-Ugric) language families in the light of archaeology: Revised and integrated 'total' correlations". In Riho Grünthal, Petri Kallio (ed.). A Linguistic Map of Prehistoric Northern Europe. Suomalais-Ugrilaisen Seuran Toimituksia / Mémoires de la Société Finno-Ougrienne. Vol. 266. Helsinki: Société Finno-Ougrienne. pp. 119–184. ISBN 978-952-5667-42-4. ISSN 0355-0230.
- Rusakov, Alexander (2017). "Albanian". In Kapović, Mate; Giacalone Ramat, Anna; Ramat, Paolo (eds.). The Indo-European Languages. Routledge. pp. 552–602. ISBN 978-1-317-39153-1.
- Schaller, Helmut (2008). "Balkanromanischer Einfluss auf das Bulgarische". In Biljana Sikimić, Tijana Ašić (ed.). The Romance Balkans. Institute for Balkan Studies (Serbia). pp. 27–36. ISBN 978-86-7179-060-4.
- Thorsø, Rasmus (2019). "Two Balkan Indo-European Loanwords". In Matilde Serangeli; Thomas Olander (eds.). Dispersals and Diversification: Linguistic and Archaeological Perspectives on the Early Stages of Indo-European. Brill's Studies in Indo-European Languages & Linguistics. Vol. 19. Brill. pp. 251–262. ISBN 978-90-04-41619-2.
- Tovar, Antonio (1977). Krahes alteuropäische Hydronymie und die westindogermanischen Sprache. Winter. ISBN 3-533-02586-1.
- Trumper, John (2018). "Some Celto-Albanian isoglosses and their implications". In Grimaldi, Mirko; Lai, Rosangela; Franco, Ludovico; Baldi, Benedetta (eds.). Structuring Variation in Romance Linguistics and Beyond: In Honour of Leonardo M. Savoia. John Benjamins Publishing Company. ISBN 978-90-272-6317-9.
- van Sluis, P. S. (2022). "Beekeeping in Celtic and Indo-European". Studia Celtica. 56 (1): 1–28. doi:10.16922/SC.56.1. hdl:1887/3655383.
- Villar, Francisco (1996). Los indoeuropeos y los orígenes de Europa (in Spanish). Madrid: Gredos. p. 316. ISBN 84-249-1787-1.
- Wilkes, J. J. (1995), The Illyrians, Oxford, United Kingdom: Blackwell Publishing, ISBN 0-631-19807-5
- Yntema, Douwe (2017). "The Pre-Roman Peoples of Apulia (1000-100 BC)". In Gary D. Farney, Guy Bradley (ed.). The Peoples of Ancient Italy. De Gruyter Reference. Walter de Gruyter GmbH & Co KG. pp. 337–. ISBN 978-1-61451-300-1.
