= Graeco-Albanian language =

Graeco-Albanian language may refer to the proposed Graeco-Albanian language family or to languages and dialects spoken by Albanophone Greeks, like:

- Arvanitika, also referred to as Greek Albanian or Arvanite, a more derived variant spoken by Arvanites in Greece, chiefly the Peloponnese, Attica and Boetia
- Cham, a variety of Tosk Albanian spoken in the region known as Chameria
