= Albanoid languages =

Branch of the Indo-European language family

Albanoid
- Albanic, Adriatic Indo-European, Illyric, Illyrian complex, Western Paleo-Balkan
- Geographic distribution: Western Balkans, Southern Italy
- Linguistic classification: Indo-European: Albanoid
- Proto-language: Proto-Albanoid
- Subdivisions: Albanian; Messapic † (supported by the available fragmentary material, but still under research); (?) Illyrian † (if defined as sibling language of Albanian); (?) Pre-Eastern Romance † (the Albanian-like features in Eastern Romance)

Language codes
- Linguasphere: 55 (phylozone)

Albanoid or Albanic is a branch or subfamily of the Indo-European (IE) languages, of which Albanian language varieties are the only surviving representatives. In current classifications of the IE language family, Albanian is grouped in the same IE branch with Messapic, an ancient extinct language of Balkan provenance that is preserved in about six hundred inscriptions from Iron Age Apulia. This IE subfamily is alternatively referred to as Illyric, Illyrian complex, Western Paleo-Balkan, or Adriatic Indo-European. Concerning "Illyrian" of classical antiquity, it is not clear whether the scantly documented evidence actually represents one language and not material from several languages, but if "Illyrian" is defined as the ancient precursor of Albanian or the sibling of Proto-Albanian it is automatically included in this IE branch. Albanoid is also used to explain Albanian-like pre-Romance features found in Eastern Romance languages.

The relation between Albanian and Messapic is supported by available fragmentary linguistic evidence that shows common characteristic innovations and a number of significant lexical correspondences between the two languages, and notably within the centum-satem classification they both feature the (partial) retention of the Proto-Indo-European three-way contrast for dorsal stops, which is limited only to them among the historical languages of the Balkans and Adriatic Sea (a similar feature is also evident in Luwian of the Anatolian languages and in Armenian). Proto-Messapic migration from the opposite Adriatic coast through a trans-Adriatic interaction network is also confirmed by recent archaeological evidence dating to the period between 1700 BCE and 1400 BCE, in the post-Cetina horizon.

== Nomenclature ==
The IE subfamily that gave rise to Albanian and Messapic is alternatively referred to as Albanoid, Albanic, Illyric, Illyrian complex, Western Palaeo-Balkan, or Adriatic Indo-European. Linguist John Trumper regards the term Albanoid as more appropriate than Illyrian as it refers to a specific ethnolinguistically pertinent and historically compact language group. Concerning "Illyrian" of classical antiquity, it is not clear whether the scantly documented evidence actually represents one language and not material from several languages. However, if "Illyrian" is defined as the ancient precursor language to Albanian, for which there is some linguistic evidence, and which is often supported for obvious geographic and historical reasons, or the sister language of Proto-Albanian, it is automatically included in this IE branch. Albanoid is also used to explain Albanian-like pre-Romance features found in Eastern Romance languages.

The term Albanoid for the IE subfamily of Albanian was firstly introduced by Indo-European historical linguist Eric Pratt Hamp (1920 – 2019), and thereafter adopted by a series of linguists. A variant term is Albanic. The root ultimately originated from the name of the Illyrian tribe Albanoi, early generalized to all the Illyrian tribes speaking the same idiom. The process was similar to the spread of the name Illyrians from a small group of people on the Adriatic coast, the Illyrioi.

== History ==
Albanoid and other Paleo-Balkan languages had their formative core in the Balkans after the Indo-European migrations in the region.

=== Indo-European diversification and dispersal ===
Indo-European phylogenetic tree where the IE dialect that gave rise to Albanian splits from Post-Tocharian Indo-European, that is the residual Indo-European unity ("Core Indo-European") which remained after Tocharian's splitting from Post-Anatolian Indo-European (by Chang et al. 2015). This tree model is also supported by Hyllested & Joseph 2022, with the difference that they consider the splitting of Armenian from Graeco-Albanian instead of Albanian from Graeco-Armenian.

Although research is ongoing, in current phylogenetic tree models of the Indo-European language family, the IE dialect that gave rise to Albanian splits from "Post-Tocharian Indo-European", that is the residual Indo-European unity ("Core Indo-European") which remained after Tocharian's splitting from "Post-Anatolian Indo-European". The transition between the Basal IE and Core IE speech communities appears to have been marked by an economic shift from a mainly non-agricultural economy to a mixed agro-pastoral economy. The lack of evidence for agricultural practices in early, eastern Yamnaya of the Don-Volga steppe does not offer a perfect archaeological proxy for the Core IE language community, rather western Yamnaya groups around or to the west of the Dnieper River better reflect that archaeological proxy. The common stage between the Late Proto-Indo-European dialects of Pre-Albanian, Pre-Armenian, and Pre-Greek, is considered to have occurred in the Late Yamnaya period after the westward migrations of Early Yamnaya across the Pontic–Caspian steppe, also remaining in the western steppe for a prolonged period of time separated from the Proto-Indo-European dialects that later gave rise in Europe to the Corded Ware and Bell Beaker cultures.

Yamnaya steppe pastoralists apparently migrated into the Balkans about 3000 to 2500 BCE, and they soon admixed with the local populations, which resulted in a tapestry of various ancestry from which speakers of the Albanian and other Paleo-Balkan languages emerged. The Albanoid speech was among the Indo-European languages that replaced the pre-Indo-European languages of the Balkans, which left traces of the Mediterranean-Balkan substratum. On the other hand, Baltic and Slavic, together with Germanic, as well as possibly Celtic and Italic, apparently emerged on the territory of the Corded Ware archaeological horizon of the late 4th and the 3rd millennium BCE. The distinction between the southern European languages (in particular Albanian and Greek) and the northern and western European languages (Baltic, Slavic, Germanic, Celtic, and Italic) is further reflected by the frequently shared lexical items of northwest pre-Indo-European substratum among the latter languages.

- Balkanic
  - Armenian
  - Graeco-Albanian
    - Graeco-Phrygian
      - Greek
      - Phrygian
        (extinct)
    - "Illyric"
      - Messapic
        (extinct)
      - Albanian

The Palaeo-Balkanic Indo-European branch based on the chapter "Albanian" (Hyllested & Joseph 2022) in Olander (ed.) The Indo-European Language Family

== Classification ==
Recent IE phylogenetic studies group the Albanoid subfamily in the same IE branch with Graeco-Phrygian and Armenian, labelled '(Palaeo-)Balkanic Indo-European', based on shared Indo-European morphological, lexical, and phonetic innovations, archaisms, as well as shared lexical proto-forms from a common pre-Indo-European substratum. (Note: A remarkable PIE root that underwent in Albanian, Armenian, and Greek a common evolution and semantic shift in the post PIE period is PIE *mel-i(t)- 'honey', from which Albanian bletë, Armenian mełu, and Greek μέλισσα, 'bee' derived. However, the Armenian term features -u- through the influence of the PIE *médʰu 'mead', which constitutes an Armenian innovation that isolates it from the Graeco-Albanian word.) (Note: A remarkable common proto-form for "goat" of non-Indo-European origin is exclusively shared between Albanian, Armenian, and Greek. It could have been borrowed at a pre-stage that was common to these languages from a pre-Indo-European substrate language that in turn had loaned the word from a third source, from which the pre-IE substrate of the proto-form that is shared between Balto-Slavic and Indo-Iranian could also have borrowed it. Hence it can be viewed as an old cultural word, which was slowly transmitted to two different pre-Indo-European substrate languages, and then independently adopted by two groups of Indo-European speakers, reflecting a post-Proto-Indo-European linguistic and geographic separation between a Balkan group consisting of Albanian, Greek, and Armenian, and a group to the North of the Black Sea consisting of Balto-Slavic and Indo-Iranian.) Innovative creations of agricultural terms shared only between Albanian and Greek were formed from non-agricultural PIE roots through semantic changes to adapt them for agriculture. Since they are limited only to Albanian and Greek, they could be traced back with certainty only to their last common IE ancestor, and not projected back into Proto-Indo-European.

Shortly after they had diverged from one another, Pre-Albanian, Pre-Greek, and Pre-Armenian undoubtedly also underwent a longer period of contact, as shown by common correspondences that are irregular for other IE languages. Furthermore, intense Greek–Albanian contacts certainly have occurred thereafter.

== Family tree ==
The various dialects of the Albanian language in Albania, Croatia, Greece, Italy, Kosovo, North Macedonia, Montenegro and Serbia. (Note: The map does not imply that the Albanian language is the majority or the only spoken language in these areas.)

- Albanoid
  - Proto-Albanian
    - Common Albanian
      - Gheg Albanian (Northern Albanian dialect)
        - Northern Gheg
          - Northwestern Gheg
            - Malsia e Madhe (in the region of Malësia)
            - Shkodra and Lezha (in the regions of Shkodër and Lezhë)
            - Arbanasi (in Zadar, Croatia)
            - Istrian Albanian (extinct)
          - Northeastern Gheg (in northeast Albania and most of Kosovo)
        - Central-Southern Gheg
          - Central Gheg
            - Upper Reka
          - Southern Gheg (includes the capital Tirana)
            - Transitional Gheg
              - Southern Elbasan
              - Southern Peqin
              - Northwestern Gramsh
      - Tosk Albanian (Southern Albanian dialect)
        - Northern Tosk (basis of Standard Modern Albanian but not identical)
          - Northeastern Tosk
            - Mandritsa Tosk (in far southeast Bulgaria)
            - Ukrainian Tosk (in Ukraine)
            - Western Thracian Tosk (in Western Thrace)
        - Southern Tosk
          - Lab
          - Cham
            - Suliot (extinct)
          - Arbëresh (in Southern Italy)
            - Puglia Arbëresh / Apulo-Arbëresh
            - Molise Arbëresh / Molisan-Arbëresh
            - Campania Arbëresh / Campano-Arbëresh
            - Basilicata Arbëresh / Basilicatan-Arbëresh
            - Calabria Arbëresh / Calabro-Arbëresh
            - Sicilia Arbëresh / Siculo-Arbëresh
          - Arvanitika (in Greece)
            - Northwestern Arvanitika
            - Southcentral Arvanitika
              - Southern Arvanitika
  - Messapic (extinct)
  - Illyrian (extinct) (?) (if sibling and not precursor of Albanian)
  - Pre-Eastern Romance (extinct) (?) (the Albanian-like features in Eastern Romance)
