= Tubolja =

Coordinates: 43°41′01″N 017°10′34″E

Tubolja (or Potubolja) is a village in Bosnia and Herzegovina.

The origin of the name of the village is unclear. The name is like Illyrian, but may have Croatian roots. The word "tubolja" meant "big rock or beams".

The village was not cited until long after its founding, including by Bakula (1867). This does not mean it was uninhabited, but that its name changed. Šilobadović (1668) referred to the Abyss. Although inhabited, it was not mentioned in the Abyss Episcopal reports from the 17th, 18th or 19th century. Probably it was included as part of Kovač. A more points to the long-term population of the area - west of the village on a hilly elevation is Illyrian tumuli Plandovišće.

In the early 20th century, Croatian ethnologist Ante Radić visited the village, as described in Proceedings of national life and običaje.

Later Tubolja attracted immigrants from Herzegovina and Dalmatia. Among the largest families are Ivanković and Kurevija.

== Relics ==
Northeast, on the Mašete is a prehistoric tumulus.

== Transition ==
The population is increasingly moving to Tomislavgrad and other European countries.
