= Illyrian language =

Extinct Indo-European language of Southeast Europe

Illyrian
- Native to: Modern Albania, Bosnia and Herzegovina, Croatia, Kosovo, Montenegro, North Macedonia and Serbia
- Region: Region of Illyria, Southeast Europe
- Ethnicity: Illyrians
- Extinct: 2nd-6th centuries
- Language family: Indo-European: (?) Albanoid; Illyrian
- Dialects: (?) Albanian; (?) Messapic †

Language codes
- ISO 639-3: xil
- Glottolog: illy1234 Illyrian
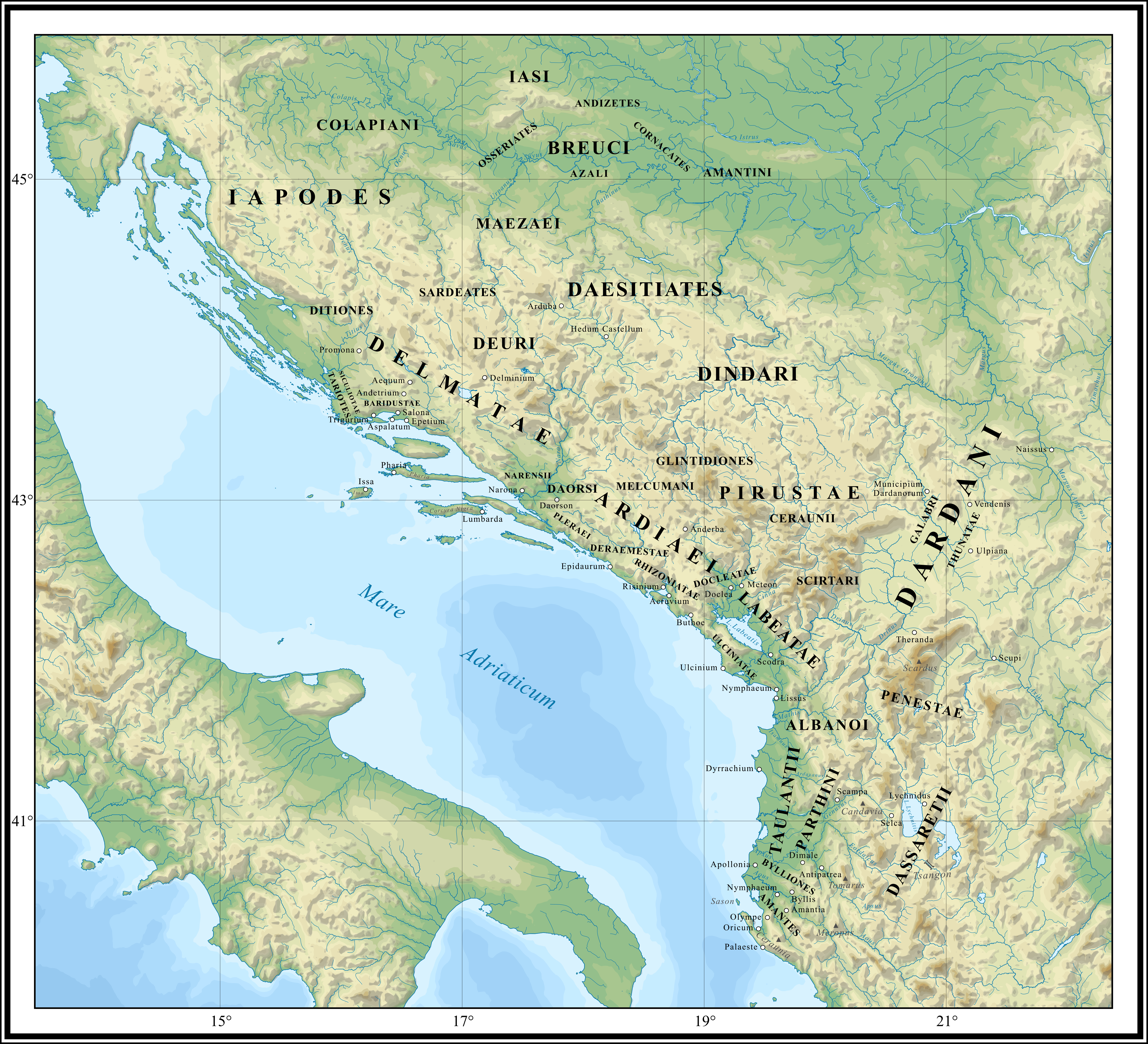
- Map of Illyrian tribes in the 1st to 2nd centuries

The Illyrian language (/ɪˈlɪriən/) was an Indo-European language or group of languages spoken by the Illyrians in Southeast Europe during antiquity. The language is unattested with the exception of personal names and placenames. Just enough information can be drawn from these to allow the conclusion that it belonged to the Indo-European language family.

In ancient sources, the term "Illyrian" is applied to a wide range of tribes settling in a large area of southeastern Europe, including Albanoi, Ardiaei, Autariatae, Dardani, Delmatae, Dassareti, Enchelei, Labeatae, Pannonii, Parthini, Taulantii and others (see list of ancient tribes in Illyria). It is not known to what extent all of these tribes formed a homogeneous linguistic group, but the study of the attested eponyms has led to the identification of a linguistic core area in the south of this zone, roughly around what is now Albania and Montenegro, where Illyrian proper is believed to have been spoken.

Little is known about the relationships between Illyrian and its neighboring languages. For lack of more information, Illyrian is typically described as occupying its own branch in the Indo-European family tree. A close relationship with Messapic, once spoken in southern Italy, has been suggested but remains unproven. Among modern languages, Albanian is often conjectured to be a surviving descendant of Illyrian, although this too remains unproven.

In the early modern era and up to the 19th century, the term "Illyrian" was also applied to the modern South Slavic language of Dalmatia, today identified as Croatian. This language is only distantly related to ancient Illyrian, as they share the common ancestor Proto-Indo-European; the two languages were never in contact as Illyrian, with the possible exception of the ancestor of Albanian, had become extinct before the Slavic migrations to the Balkans.

== Era ==
Illyrian proper went extinct between the 2nd and 6th centuries AD, with the possible exception of a branch that may have survived and developed into Albanian.

It has also been claimed that Illyrian was preserved and spoken in the countryside, as attested in the 4th–5th century testimonies of St. Jerome.

== Classification and terminology ==
Illyrian was part of the Indo-European language family. Its relation to other Indo-European languages, ancient and modern, is poorly understood because of the paucity of data and because it is still being examined. Today, the main source of authoritative information about Illyrian consists of a handful of Illyrian words cited in classical sources and numerous examples of Illyrian anthroponyms, ethnonyms, toponyms and hydronyms. The scarcity of the data makes it difficult to identify the sound changes that have taken place in Illyrian; the most widely accepted one is that the Indo-European voiced aspirates /bʰ/, /dʰ/, /ɡʰ/ became voiced consonants /b/, /d/, /ɡ/.

Messapic was an Iron Age language spoken in Apulia by the Iapygians (Messapians, Peucetians, Daunians), which settled in Italy as part of an Illyrian migration from Illyria in the transitional period between the Bronze and Iron ages. As such, Messapic, as a distinct language, is considered to be part of the same Paleo-Balkan grouping as Illyrian. Eric Hamp has grouped them under "Messapo-Illyrian" which is further grouped with Albanian under "Adriatic Indo-European". Other schemes group the three languages under "General Illyrian" and "Western Paleo-Balkan".

In older research under the influence of pan-Illyrian theories, the Histrian, Venetic and Liburnian languages were considered to be Illyrian dialects. As archaeological research developed and the onomastic data about those languages increased, it became clear that they are not related to Illyrian either as dialects or as part of the same branch.

=== Centum versus satem ===
- Balkanic
  - Armenian
  - Graeco-Albanian
    - Graeco-Phrygian
      - Greek
      - Phrygian
        (extinct)
    - "Illyric"
      - Messapic
        (extinct)
      - Albanian

The Palaeo-Balkanic Indo-European branch based on the chapter "Albanian" (Hyllested & Joseph 2022) in Olander (ed.) The Indo-European Language Family

In the absence of sufficient lexical data and texts written in Illyrian, the theories supporting the centum character of the Illyrian language have been based mainly on the centum character of the Venetic language, which was thought to be related to Illyrian, in particular regarding Illyrian toponyms and names such as Vescleves, Acrabanus, Gentius, Clausal etc. The relation between Venetic and Illyrian was later discredited and they are no longer considered closely related. Scholars supporting the satem character of Illyrian highlight particular toponyms and personal names such as Asamum, Birzinimum, Zanatis etc. in which these scholars see satem-type reflexes of Indo-European roots. They also point to other toponyms including Osseriates derived from h₁éǵʰeros "lake" or Birziminium from PIE bʰergʰ- "project" or Asamum from PIE h₂eḱ-mo-s "sharp".

Even if the above-mentioned Venetic toponyms and personal names are accepted as Illyrian in origin, it is not clear that they originated in a centum language. Vescleves, Acrabanus, Gentius and Clausal are explained by proponents of the hypothesis that Illyrian had a centum character, through comparison with IE languages such as Sanskrit or Ancient Greek, or reconstructed PIE. For example, Vescleves has been explained as PIE *h₁wesu-ḱléw- (of good fame). Also, the name Acrabanus as a compound name has been compared with Ancient Greek ἄκρος with no signs of palatalization, or Clausal has been related to ḱlewH- (wash, rinse). In all these cases the supporters of the centum character of the Illyrian language consider PIE *ḱ > *k or PIE *ǵ > *g followed by l or r to be evidence of a centum character of the Illyrian language. However, it has been shown that even in Albanian and Balto-Slavic, which are satem-like languages (unclear as Albanian is viewed as neither centum nor satem), the palatovelars have been generally depalatized (PIE *ḱ > *k or PIE *ǵ > *g followed by l or r in Albanian) in this phonetical position. The name Gentius or Genthius does not help either as there are two Illyrian forms for it, Genthius and Zanatis. If Gentius or Genthius derives from ǵenh₁- ("to be born"), this is proof of a centum language, but if the name Zanatis is similarly generated (or from ǵneh₃- "know") then Illyrian is a satem language. Another problem related to the name Gentius is that it cannot be stated whether the initial g of the sources was a palatovelar or a labiovelar. Kretschmer identified both Illyrian and Messapic as satem languages due to the change from IE o to a. On the other hand, he classified Venetic as centum due to the preservation of the IE o.

Taking into account the absence of sufficient data and sometimes the dual nature of their interpretation, the centum/satem character of the Illyrian language is still uncertain and requires more evidence.

== Dialects ==
The Greeks were the first literate people to come into frequent contact with Illyrian speakers. Their conception of "Illyrioi", however, differed from what the Romans would later call "Illyricum". The Greek term encompassed only the peoples who lived on the borders of Macedonia and Epirus. Pliny the Elder, in his work Natural History, still applies a stricter usage of the term Illyrii when speaking of Illyrii proprie dicti ("Illyrians properly so-called") among the native communities in the south of Roman Dalmatia.

For a couple of centuries before and after the Roman conquest in the late 1st century BC, the concept of Illyricum expanded towards the west and north. Finally it encompassed all native peoples from the Adriatic to the Danube, inhabiting the Roman provinces of Dalmatia, Pannonia and Moesia, regardless of their ethnic and cultural differences.

An extensive study of Illyrian names and territory was undertaken by Hans Krahe in the first decades of the twentieth century. He and other scholars argued for a broad distribution of Illyrian peoples considerably beyond the Balkans, though in his later work, Krahe curbed his view of the extent of Illyrian settlement.

The further refinements of Illyrian onomastic provinces for that Illyrian area included in the later Roman province were proposed by Géza Alföldy. He identified five principal groups: (1) "real Illyrians" south of the river Neretva and extending south of the provincial boundary with Macedonia at the river Drin to include the Illyris of north and central Albania; (2) the Delmatae who occupied the middle Adriatic coast between the "real Illyrians" and the Liburni; (3) the Venetic Liburni of the northeast Adriatic; (4) the Japodes who dwelt north of the Delmatae and beyond the Liburni, where names reveal a mixture of Venetic, Celtic and Illyrian; and (5) the Pannonian people north in Bosnia, Northern Montenegro, and western Serbia.

These identifications were later challenged by Radoslav Katičić who on the basis of personal names which occur commonly in Illyricum distinguished three onomastic areas: (1) South-Eastern Illyrian, extending southwards from the southern part of Montenegro and including most of Albania west of the river Drin, though its demarcation to the south remains uncertain; (2) Central Illyrian consisting of most of ex-Yugoslavia, north of southern Montenegro to the west of Morava, excepting ancient Liburnia in the northwest, but perhaps extending into Pannonia in the north; (3) Liburnian, whose names resemble those of the Venetic territory to the northeast.

The onomastic differences between the South-Eastern and Central areas are not sufficient to show that two clearly differentiated dialects of Illyrian were in use in these areas. However, as Katičić has argued, the core onomastic area of Illyrian proper is to be located in the southeast of that Balkan region, traditionally associated with the Illyrians (centered in modern Albania).

Traditionally Illyrian has referred to any non-Celtic language in the region. Recent scholarship from the 1960s and on tends to agree that the region inhabited by Illyrian tribes can be divided into three distinct linguistic and cultural areas, of which only one can be properly termed "Illyrian". No written texts regarding self-identification exist from the Illyrians and no inscriptions in Illyrian exist, with the only linguistic remains being some personal and place names, and some glosses.

== Vocabulary ==
Since there are no Illyrian texts, sources for identifying Illyrian words have been identified by Hans Krahe as being of four kinds: inscriptions, glosses of Illyrian words in classical texts, names—including proper names (mostly inscribed on tombstones), toponyms and river names—and Illyrian loanwords in other languages. The last category has proven particularly contentious. The names occur in sources that range over more than a millennium, including numismatic evidence, as well as posited original forms of placenames. There are no Illyrian inscriptions (Messapian inscriptions are treated separately, and there is no consensus that they are to be reckoned as Illyrian). The spearhead found at Kovel and thought by some to be Illyrian is considered by the majority of runologists to be Eastern Germanic, and most likely Gothic, while a votive inscription on a ring found near Shkodër which was initially interpreted as Illyrian was shown to actually be Byzantine Greek.

== See also ==
- Thraco-Illyrian
- Thracian language
- Paeonian language

== Bibliography ==
- Alföldy, Géza (1964). "Die Namengebung der Urbevölkerung in der römischen Provinz Dalmatia". Beiträge zur Namenforschung. 15: 55–104.
- Andersen, Henning (2003). Language Contacts in Prehistory: Studies in Stratigraphy, Volume 2001. John Benjamins Publishing Company. ISBN 1-58811-379-5.
- Benać, Alojz (1964). Symposium sur la Délimitation Territoriale et Chronologique des Illyriens à l'Epoque Préhistorique. Sarajevo: Naučno društvo SR Bosne i Hercegovine.
- Best, Jan G. P.; de Vries, Nanny M. W.; Henri Frankfort Foundation (1982). Interaction and Acculturation in the Mediterranean: Proceedings of the Second International Congress of Mediterranean Pre- and Protohistory, Amsterdam, 19–23 November 1980. John Benjamins Publishing Company. ISBN 90-6032-195-2.
- Birnbaum, Henrik; Puhvel, Jaan (1966). Ancient Indo-European Dialects: Proceedings of the Conference on Indo-European Linguistics held at the University of California, Los Angeles, April 25–27, 1963. Berkeley and Los Angeles: California University Press.
- Blench, Roger (1999). Archaeology and Language II: Archaeological Data and Linguistic Hypotheses. Psychology Press. ISBN 0-415-11761-5.
- Boardman, John (1982). The Cambridge Ancient History Volume 3: The Prehistory of the Balkans and the Middle East and the Aegean World, Tenth to Eighth Centuries B.C. Cambridge University Press. ISBN 0-521-22496-9.
- Bunson, Matthew (1995). A Dictionary of the Roman Empire. Oxford University Press US. ISBN 0-19-510233-9.
- Christidis, Anastasios-Phoivos; Arapopoulou, Maria; Chritē, Maria (2007). A History of Ancient Greek: From the Beginnings to Late Antiquity. Cambridge, United Kingdom: Cambridge University Press. ISBN 978-0-521-83307-3.
- Cicero, Marcus Tullius; Dyck, Andrew Roy (2008). Catilinarians. Cambridge University Press. ISBN 978-0-521-83286-1.
- Davison, David; Gaffney, Vincent L.; Wilkes, John J.; Marin, Emilio (2006). Dalmatia: Research in the Roman province 1970-2001: Papers in Honour of J.J. Wilkes. Archaeopress. ISBN 1-84171-790-8.
- Demiraj, Shaban (1988). Gjuha shqipe dhe historia e saj. Shtëpia Botuese e Librit Universitar.
- Demiraj, Shaban (1996). Fonologjia historike e gjuhës shqipe. Akademia e Shkencave e Republikës së Shqipërisë.
- Demiraj, Shaban (1999). Prejardhja e shqiptarëve në dritën e dëshmive të gjuhës shqipe. Tiranë: Shtëpia Botuese "Shkenca". ISBN 99927-654-7-X.
- Fol, Aleksandŭr (2002). Thrace and the Aegean: Proceedings of the Eighth International Congress of Thracology, Sofia – Yambol, 25–29 September 2000. International Foundation Europa Antiqua. ISBN 954-90714-5-6.
- Fortson, Benjamin W. (2004). Indo-European Language and Culture: An Introduction. Wiley-Blackwell. ISBN 1-4051-0316-7.
- Hamp, Eric Pratt (1960). "Palatal before resonant in Albanian". Zeitschrift für vergleichende Sprachforschung. 76: 275–280.
- Hamp, Eric Pratt; Ismajli, Rexhep (2007). Comparative Studies on Albanian. Akademia e Shkencave dhe e Arteve e Kosovës. ISBN 978-9951-413-62-6.
- Hamp, Eric; Adams, Douglas (2013). "The Expansion of the Indo-European Languages: An Indo-Europeanist's Evolving View" (PDF). Sino-Platonic Papers. 239.
- Hornblower, Simón; Spawforth, Antony (2003). The Oxford Classical Dictionary. Oxford University Press. ISBN 0-19-860641-9.
- Ismajli, Rexhep (2015). Eqrem Basha (ed.). Studime për historinë e shqipes në kontekst ballkanik [Studies on the History of Albanian in the Balkan context] (PDF) (in Albanian). Prishtinë: Kosova Academy of Sciences and Arts, special editions CLII, Section of Linguistics and Literature.
- Katičić, Radoslav (1965). "Zur Frage der keltischen und pannonischen Namengebiete im römischen Dalmatien". Godisnjak (Annuaire). 3. Sarajevo: Centar za balkanoloske studije: 53–76.
- Katičić, Radoslav (1976). Ancient Languages of the Balkans, Part One. Paris: Mouton. ISBN 0-902993-30-5.
- Kortlandt, Frederik (2008). Balto-Slavic Phonological Developments (PDF). Leiden University.
- Krahe, Hans (1925). Die alten balkanillyrischen geographischen namen auf grund von autoren und inschriften. C. Winter.
- Krahe, Hans (1955). Die Sprache der Illyrier. Erster Teil: Die Quellen. Wiesbaden.
- Krahe, Hans (1962). "Die Struktur der alteuropäischen Hydronomie". Abhandlungen der Geistes- und Sozialwissenschaftlichen Klasse. 5: 285–341.
- Krahe, Hans (1964). Unsere ältesten Flussnamen. O. Harrassowitz.
- Lewis, D. M.; Boardman, John (1994). The Cambridge Ancient History (Volume 6): The Fourth Century B.C. Cambridge University Press. ISBN 0-521-23348-8.
- Mallory, James P.; Adams, Douglas Q. (1997). Encyclopedia of Indo-European Culture. London: Fitzroy Dearborn Publishers. ISBN 1-884964-98-2.
- Mayani, Zĕchariă (1962). The Etruscans begin to speak. Souvenir Press.
- Mayer, Anton (1957). Die Sprache der alten Illyrier, Volume 1. In Kommission bei R. M. Rohrer.
- Ó hÓgáin, Dáithí (2003). The Celts: A History. Woodbridge: Boydell Press. ISBN 0-85115-923-0.
- Ognenova, Ljuba (1959). "Nouvelle Interprétation de l'Inscription " Illyrienne " d'Albanie". Bulletin de correspondance hellénique. 83 (2): 794–799. doi:10.3406/bch.1959.5041.
- Pomeroy, Sarah B.; Burstein, Stanley M.; Donlan, Walter; Roberts, Jennifer Tolbert (2008). A Brief History of Ancient Greece: Politics, Society, and Culture. Oxford University Press. ISBN 978-0-19-537235-9.
- Prendergast, Eric (2017). The Origin and Spread of Locative Determiner Omission in the Balkan Linguistic Area (Ph.D). UC Berkeley.
- Wilkes, John J. (1995). The Illyrians. Oxford: Blackwell Publishing. ISBN 0-631-19807-5.
- Williams, Craig Arthur (2004). Epigrams: Martial. Oxford University Press US. ISBN 0-19-515531-9.
- Woodard, Roger D. (2008). The Ancient Languages of Europe. Cambridge University Press. ISBN 978-0-521-68495-8.
