= Liburnian language =

Hypothetical extinct Indo-European language

Liburnian
- (hypothetical)
- Native to: Southwestern Croatia
- Region: Southeast Europe
- Ethnicity: Liburnians
- Extinct: Late antiquity
- Language family: Indo-European: (unclassified); Liburnian

Language codes
- ISO 639-3: xli
- Glottolog: None
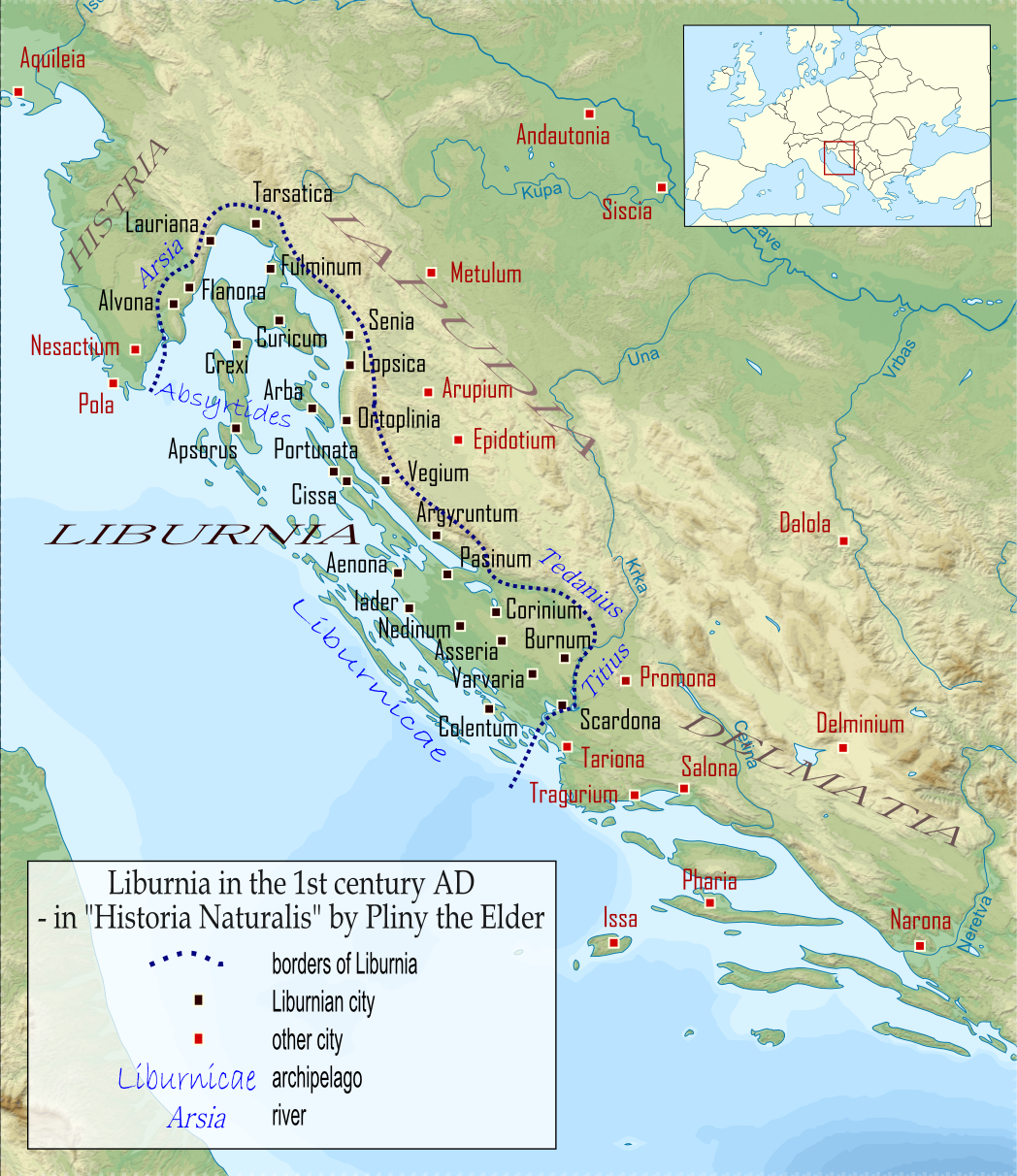
- Territory of the Liburnians and the place where Liburnian was spoken in the 1st century

The Liburnian language is an unclassified and unattested language spoken by the ancient Liburnians in Late antiquity. Assumed to have been an Indo-European language with a significant proportion of the Pre-Indo-European elements from the wider area of the ancient Mediterranean.

Due to the paucity of evidence, the very existence of a distinct 'Liburnian language' is hypothetical and its genealogical relation to surrounding ancient Celtic, Etruscan, Italic and Illyrian languages is entirely speculative.

== Classification ==
No writings in Liburnian are known. The only presumed Liburnian linguistic remains are Liburnian toponyms and some family and personal names in Liburnia presumed to be native to the area, in Latinized form from the 1st century AD. Smaller differences found in the archaeological material of narrower regions in Liburnia are in a certain measure reflected also in these scarce linguistic remains. This has caused much speculation about the language but no certainty.

Features shared by Liburnian and other languages have been noted in Liburnian language remains, names and toponyms, dating from between the Iron Age and the beginning of the Common Era. These are insufficient for a precise linguistic classification, other than a general indication that they have an Indo-European basis, but also may incorporate significant elements from Pre-Indo-European languages. This also appears to be the case in their social relations, and such phenomena are likely related to their separate cultural development, physical isolation and mixed ethnic origins.

Following studies of the onomastics of the Roman province of Dalmatia, Géza Alföldy has suggested that the Liburni and Histri belonged to the Venetic language area. In particular, some Liburnian anthroponyms show strong Venetic affinities, a few similar names and common roots, such as Vols-, Volt-, and Host- (< PIE *ghos-ti- 'stranger, guest, host'). Liburnian and Venetic names sometimes also share suffixes in common, such as -icus and -ocus.

Jürgen Untermann, who has focused on Liburnian and Venetic onomastics, considers that only the Liburnians at the north-eastern Istrian coast were strongly Venetic. Untermann has suggested three groups of Liburnian names: one structurally similar to those of the Veneti and Histri; another linked to the Dalmatae, Iapodes and other Illyrians on the mainland to the south of the Liburnians, and a third group of names that were common throughout Liburnian territory, and lacked any relation to those of their neighbors.

Other proper names, such as those of local deities and toponyms also showed differing regional distributions. According to R. Katičić, Liburnian toponyms, in both structure and form, demonstrate diverse influences, including Pre-Indo-European, Indo-European and other, purely local features. Katičić has also stated that toponyms were distributed separately along ethnic and linguistic lines.

S. Čače has noted that it can not be determined whether Liburnian was more related to the North Adriatic language group (Veneti, Histri) or the languages of Iapodes and Dalmatae, due to the scarcity of evidence. While the Liburnians differed significantly from the Histri and Veneti, both culturally and ethnically, they have been linked to the Dalmatae by their burial traditions.

Other toponymical and onomastic similarities have been found between Liburnia and other regions of both Illyria and Asia Minor, especially Lycia, Lydia, Caria, Pisidia, Isauria, Pamphylia, Lycaonia and Cilicia, as well as similarities in elements of social organization, such as matriarchy/gynecocracy (gynaikokratia) and the numerical organization of territory. These are also features of the wider Adriatic region, especially Etruria, Messapia and southern Italy. Toponymical and onomastic connections to Asia Minor may also indicate a Liburnian presence amongst the Sea Peoples.

The old toponym Liburnum in Liguria may also link the Liburnian name to the Etruscans, as well as the proposed Tyrsenian language family.

The Liburnians underwent Romanization after being conquered by the Romans in 35 BCE. The Liburnian language was replaced by Latin and underwent language death –most likely during Late Antiquity. The Liburnians nevertheless retained some of their cultural traditions until the 4th century CE, especially in the larger cities – a fact attested by archaeology.

== Onomastics ==
=== Anthroponyms ===
The single name plus patronymic formula common among Illyrians is rare among Liburnians. In a region where the Roman three-name formula (praenomen, nomen gentile, cognomen: Caius Julius Caesar) spread at an early date, a native two-name formula appears in several variants. Personal name plus family name is found in southern Liburnia, while personal name plus family name plus patronymic is found throughout the Liburnian area, for example: Avita Suioca Vesclevesis, Velsouna Suioca Vesclevesis f(ilia), Avita Aquillia L(uci) f(ilia), Volsouna Oplica Pl(a)etoris f(ilia), Vendo Verica Triti f(ilius).

Ethnolinguistic map of Italy in the Iron Age, before the Roman expansion and conquest of Italy

Among the personal names of the so-called 'Liburnian' area are Aetor, Ceunus, Cliticus, Curticus, Dmocus, Lambicus, Oplus, Raecus, Suioca, Turus, Vadica, Verica, Viniocus, Volso, Voltimesis, Voltissa, and Zupricus.

The majority of the following names are unknown among the eastern and southern neighbors of the Liburnians (Dalmatae, etc.), and many have Venetic complements:

- Acaica
- Aetor
- Avitus (masc.), Avita (fem.)
- Boninus
- Cliticus
- Colatina
- Curticus
- Darmo
- Dumma
- Hosp(olis)
- Hostiducis (gen.)
- Hostiices
- Lambicus
- Malavicus
- Marica
- Menda
- Moicus
- Oclatinus
- Oeplus
- Opia
- Opiavus
- Oplus
- Plaetor, gen. Plaetoris. (Note: Found among the Veneti as Plaetorius; among the Illyrians as Plator, genitive Platoris. Attested as Pletor in an inscription found in the area of Ljubljana in Slovenia.)
- Patalius
- Recus
- Suioca
- Tarnis
- Toruca
- Trosius
- Turus
- Vadica
- Velsouna (fem.)
- Viniocus
- Volaesa
- Volscus
- Volsetis (gen.)
- Volso
- Volsonus
- Volsounus (masc.), Volsouna (fem.)
- Volsus
- Voltimesis (gen.)
- Vol(l)tis(s)a
- Zupricus

The following names are judged to be exclusively Liburnian:

- Aeia
- Barcinus
- Buzetius
- Caminis (gen.)
- Ceunus
- Clausus
- Granp (...). (Note: Attested only in abbreviated form.)
- Iaefus
- Lastimeis (gen. ?)
- Mamaester
- Pasinus
- Picusus
- Tetenus
- Vesclevesis (gen.). (Note: This name is well-established as a compound, with the initial element Ves- from PIE *u̯esu- ('good') and the second element -cleves- (genitive suffix -is) from PIE *ḱleuos ('fame', ultimately from *ḱleu- 'to hear').)
- Virno

=== Theonyms ===
Among the theonyms of the so-called 'Liburnian' area are female deities Iutossica, Latra and Sentona.

- Anzotica or Ansotica - the Liburnian Venus; worshipped in Aenona.
- Iicus - the only male Liburnian deity; worshipped in Aenona.
- Iutossica - goddess worshipped in Albona.
- Aitica - goddess worshipped in Albona.
- Sentona - goddess worshipped in Albona, Flanona and Tarsatica, among the Northern Liburni.
- Latra - goddess worshipped in Nedinum, Corinium, Asseria and Scardona.

=== Toponyms ===
Among the toponyms of the so-called 'Liburnian' area are Aenona, Alvona, Flanona, Fulfinium, Lopsica, Ludrum, and Scardona.

== See also ==
- Venetic language
- Italic languages
- Illyrian languages
