= Claude Brixhe =

French linguist

Claude Brixhe (24 April 1933 – 2 March 2021) was a French linguist and Professor Emeritus at the University of Nancy in France.

Claude Brixhe was born on 24 April 1933 in Serrouville. His research interests included Ancient Greek dialects and modern Greek dialects, Koine Greek, the history of the Greek alphabet, and languages related to Greek, most notably Phrygian. He is globally renowned for compiling the standard monumental work on the Phrygian language — the Corpus des inscriptions paléo-phrygiennes (CIPPh).

In a 1993 article, Brixhe wrote about the influence of koine on the Doric dialect Cretan. He studied Cretan inscriptions from the Hellenistic period and substantiated the presence of forms that were a product of linguistic admixture, as well as those that could be attributed to koine. Araceli Striano writes: "This fact highlighted something which scholars had already suspected: koine did not suddenly replace the local dialects nor did those dialects disappear abruptly. On the contrary, the process of linguistic leveling in the Greek-speaking world was rather gradual, fostering the emergence of standard local varieties with their own distinctive particularities due to the coexistence of koine and different variants of ancient Greek."

In 2005, Brixhe was asked to examine over 200 graffiti and short phrases inscribed onto pottery fragments (potsherds) dating to the 6th and early 5th centuries BC that had been unearthed at the sanctuary of Apollo in Ancient Zone. Brixhe concluded that a Thracian language of these inscriptions shared much closer lexical and structural commonalities with ancient Greek and Phrygian than previous academic models had assumed.
