= Graeco-Albanian languages =

Proposed Indo-European subfamily

Graeco-Albanian
- Albano-Greek
- (proposed)
- Geographic distribution: Southern Europe
- Linguistic classification: Indo-European: Paleo-Balkan; Graeco-Albanian
- Proto-language: Proto-Graeco-Albanian
- Subdivisions: Albanoid (Illyric); Graeco-Phrygian

Language codes

- Balkanic
  - Armenian
  - Graeco-Albanian
    - Graeco-Phrygian
      - Greek
      - Phrygian
        (extinct)
    - Illyric
      - Messapic
        (extinct)
      - Albanian

The Palaeo-Balkanic Indo-European branch based on the chapters "Albanian" (Hyllested & Joseph 2022) and "Armenian" (Olsen & Thorsø 2022) in Olander (ed.) The Indo-European Language Family

Graeco-Albanian or Albano-Greek is a proposed Indo-European subfamily – in the broader linguistic family known as (Palaeo-)Balkanic Indo-European – of which the only surviving representatives are Albanian and Greek. This Indo-European subfamily encompasses the Albanoid (Illyric) subbranch, and the Graeco-Phrygian subbranch (Greek and Phrygian). Within the Palaeo-Balkan branch this IE subfamily is separated from Armenian.

== Graeco-Albanian proposed innovations ==
A remarkable PIE root that underwent in Albanian, Armenian, and Greek a common evolution and semantic shift in the post PIE period is PIE *mel-i(t)- 'honey', from which Albanian bletë and mjalcë, Armenian mełu, and Greek μέλισσα (mélissa) or μέλιττα (mélitta) 'bee' derived. However, the Armenian term features -u- through the influence of the PIE *médʰu 'mead', which constitutes an Armenian innovation that isolates it from the Graeco-Albanian word.

Innovative creations of agricultural terms shared only between Albanian and Greek, such as *h₂(e)lbʰ-it- 'barley' and *spor-eh₂- 'seed', were formed from non-agricultural Proto-Indo-European roots through semantic changes to adapt them for agriculture. Since they are limited only to Albanian and Greek, they could be traced back with certainty only to their last common Indo-European ancestor, and not projected back into Proto-Indo-European.

== Criticism ==
According to linguist Lucien van Beek – the author of the chapter "Greek" in the book The Indo-European Language Family by Thomas Olander (ed., 2022) – a number of potential Greek and Albanian common innovations adduced by Hyllested and Joseph in the chapter "Albanian" in the same book "can or must be dated later than Proto-Greek", concluding that he is "not convinced of a close genetic relation between Greek and Albanian".
