= Graeco-Phrygian languages =

Proposed subgroup of Indo-European languages

Graeco-Phrygian
- Greco-Phrygian
- (proposed)
- Geographic distribution: Southern Balkans, Anatolia and Cyprus
- Ethnicity: Greeks and Phrygians
- Linguistic classification: Indo-European: Graeco-Phrygian
- Proto-language: Proto-Graeco-Phrygian
- Subdivisions: Hellenic; Phrygian †

Language codes
- Glottolog: grae1234

Graeco-Phrygian (/ˌɡriːkoʊˈfrɪdʒiən/) is a proposed subgroup of the Indo-European language family which comprises the Hellenic and Phrygian languages.

Modern consensus since at least 2009 views Greek as the closest relative of Phrygian, a position that is supported by Brixhe, Harmatta, Neumann, Matzinger, Orel, Ligorio, Lubotsky, Obrador-Cursach, Olsen, Thorsø, Hyllested, Joseph, Van Beek and Van Hes. Furthermore, out of 36 isoglosses collected by Obrador Cursach, Phrygian shared 34 with Greek, with 22 being exclusive between them. The last 50 years of Phrygian scholarship developed a hypothesis that proposes a proto-Graeco-Phrygian stage out of which Greek and Phrygian originated, and if Phrygian was more sufficiently attested, that stage could perhaps be reconstructed.

== Evidence ==
The linguist Claude Brixhe points to the following features Greek and Phrygian are known to have in common and in common with no other language:

- a certain class of masculine nouns in the nominative singular ending in -s
- a certain class of denominal verbs
- the pronoun auto-
- the participial suffix -meno-
- the stem kako-
- and the conjunction ai

Obrador-Cursach (2019) has presented further phonetic, morphological and lexical evidence supporting a close relation between Greek and Phrygian, as seen in the following tables that compare the different isoglosses between Phrygian, Greek, Armenian, Albanian and Indo-Iranian.

Phonetic
Phrygian features	Greek	Armenian	Albanian	Indo-Iranian
Centum treatment	+	–	–	–
*CRh₃C > *CRōC	+	–	–	–
Loss of /s/	+	+	+	–
Prothetic vowels	+	+	+	–
*-ih₂ > -iya	+	–	+	–
*ki̯- > s-	+	–	–	–
*-m > -n	+	+	?	–
*M > T	–	+	–	–

Morphological (Note: Highlighted text indicates that borrowing cannot be totally ruled out.)
Phrygian features	Greek	Armenian	Albanian	Indo-Iranian
Conditional ai	+	–	–	–
e-augment	+	+	+	+
e-demonstrative	+	–	–	–
*-eh₂-s masc.	+	–	–	–
t-enlargement	+	–	–	–
verbs in -e-yo-	+	–	–	–
verbs in -o-yo-	+	–	–	–
*-d^{h}n̥	+	–	–	–
*d^{h}h₁s-ó-	+	–	–	–
*-eu̯-/*-ēu̯-	+	–	–	–
*g^{u̯h}er-mo-	+	+	+	–
*g^{u̯}neh₂-ik-	+	+	–	–
*h₂eu̯-to-	+	–	+	–
*h₃nh₃-mn-	+	+	–	–
*méǵh₂-s	+	–	–	–
*meh₁	+	+	+	+
*-mh₁no-	+	–	–	–
ni(y)/νι	+	–	–	–
*-(t)or	–	?	–	–
-toy/-τοι	+	–	–	+

Lexical (Note: Highlighted text indicates that borrowing cannot be totally ruled out.)
Phrygian features	Greek	Armenian	Albanian	Indo-Iranian
*b^{h}oh₂-t-/*b^{h}eh₂-t-	+	–	–	–
*(h₁)en-mén-	+	–	–	–
*ǵ^{h}l̥h₃-ró-	+	–	–	–
kako-	+	–	–	–
ken-	+	+	–	–
*koru̯-	+	–	–	–
*mōro-	+	–	–	–
*sleh₂g^{u̯}-	+	–	–	–

== Other proposals ==
Hellenic has also been variously grouped with Armenian and Indo-Iranian (Graeco-Armenian; Graeco-Aryan) and, more recently, Messapic. The linguist Václav Blažek states that, in regard to the classification of these languages, "the lexical corpora do not allow any quantification" (see corpus and quantitative comparative linguistics).

== Bibliography ==
- Harmatta, János (1975). "The Prehistory of the Greek Language". Annales Universitatis Budapestinensis, Sectio Classica. 3: 3–10.
- Orel, Vladimir (1993). "The position of Phrygian". Annual of Armenian Linguistics. 14: 55–67.
- Ligorio, Orsat; Lubotsky, Alexander (2018). "Phrygian". In Jared Klein; Brian Joseph; Matthias Fritz (eds.). Handbook of Comparative and Historical Indo-European Linguistics. HSK 41.3. Berlin, Boston: De Gruyter Mouton. pp. 1816–1831. doi:10.1515/9783110542431-022. hdl:1887/63481. ISBN 9783110542431. S2CID 242082908.
- Obrador-Cursach, Bartomeu (2018). Lexicon of the Phrygian Inscriptions (PDF). University of Barcelona – Faculty of Philology – Department of Classical, Romance and Semitic Philology. Archived from the original (PDF) on 2024-08-29.
- Obrador-Cursach, Bartomeu (2020). "On the place of Phrygian among the Indo-European languages". Journal of Language Relationship. 17 (3–4): 233–245. doi:10.31826/jlr-2019-173-407. S2CID 215769896.
- Hyllested, Adam; Joseph, Brian (2022). "Albanian". In Thomas Olander (ed.). The Indo-European Language Family: A Phylogenetic Perspective. Cambridge University Press. pp. 223–245.
- Olsen, Birgit Anette; Thorsø, Rasmus (2022). "Armenian". In Thomas Olander (ed.). The Indo-European Language Family: A Phylogenetic Perspective. Cambridge University Press. pp. 202–222.
- Van Beek, Lucien (2022). "Greek". In Thomas Olander (ed.). The Indo-European Language Family: A Phylogenetic Perspective. Cambridge University Press. pp. 173–201.
- Van Hes, Sander (2024). "The Ancient Greek Local Suffixes -θεν, -θε(ν), -θι, and -σε". In David M. Goldstein; Stephanie W. Jamison; Anthony D. Yates (eds.). Proceedings of the 33rd Annual UCLA Indo-European Conference. pp. 43–60.
- Woodhouse, Robert (2009). "An overview of research on Phrygian from the nineteenth century to the present day". Studia Linguistica Universitatis Iagellonicae Cracoviensis. 126 (1): 167–188. doi:10.2478/v10148-010-0013-x. ISSN 2083-4624.
