= Katun =

Katun mainly refers to a form of autonomous medieval community in the Balkans, generally made up of semi-nomadic herders (see Katun (community)). The term has been preserved in some local place names:

- Katun (Vranje), a village in Vranje Municipality, Serbia
- Katun (Aleksinac), a village in Aleksinac Municipality, Serbia
- Gornji Katun, a village in Varvarin Municipality, Serbia
- Donji Katun, a village in Varvarin Municipality, Serbia
- Katun, Pljevlja, a village in Pljevlja Municipality, Montenegro
- Katun nahiya, a small province (nahiya) during the Ottoman rule in Montenegro
- Katun, Poreč, a village in Poreč Municipality, Croatia

== Other places ==
- Katúň, a village in eastern Slovakia
- Katun (river), a tributary of the Ob in Siberia, Russia
- Katun Nature Reserve, a Russian nature reserve in the Altai Mountains, Russia
- Katun, Iran, a village in Kurdistan Province, Iran

== Other uses ==
- Katun (album), a 2007 album by the Mexican death metal band Hacavitz
- K'atun, a period of time spanning 20 tuns or 7,200 days in the pre-Columbian Maya calendar
- Katun (roller coaster), a roller coaster at the Mirabilandia Amusement Park near Ravenna, Italy
