= Albanian–Eastern Romance linguistic parallels =

Linguistic contact research

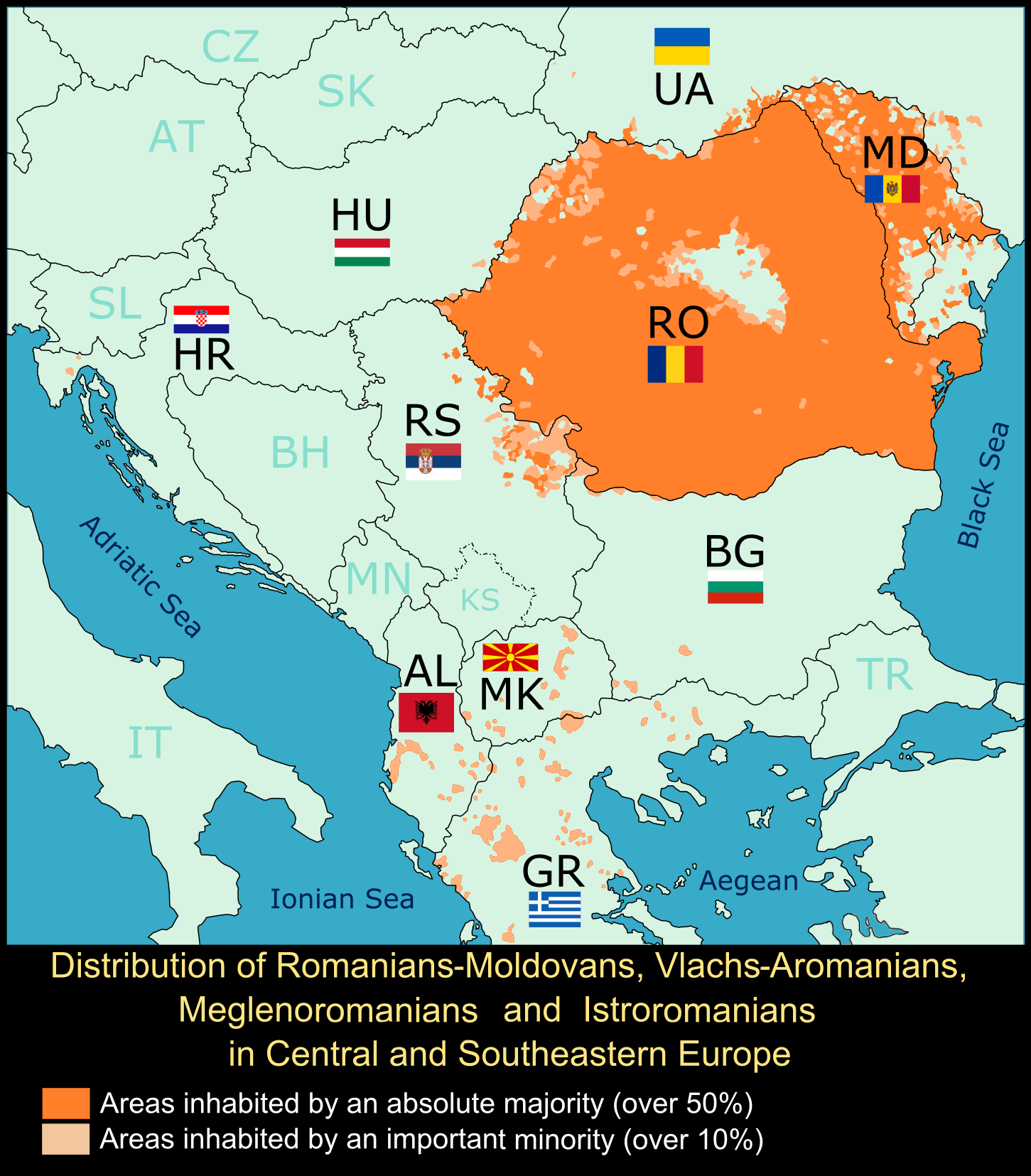
Geographic distribution of speakers of the Albanian (top) and Eastern Romance (bottom) languages

The Albanian–Eastern Romance linguistic parallels are subject of historical and contact linguistic research applied to the Albanian and Eastern Romance languages (Aromanian, Megleno-Romanian, Romanian and Istro-Romanian). It has also been studied to understand the history of Albanian and Eastern Romance speakers. The common phonological, morphological and syntactical features of the two language families have been studied for more than a century. Both are part of the Balkan sprachbund but there are certain elements shared only by Albanian and Eastern Romance languages that descended from Common Romanian. Aside from Latin, and from shared Greek, Slavic and Turkish elements, other characteristics and words are attributed to the Paleo-Balkan linguistic base. Similarities between Eastern Romance and Albanian are not limited to their common Balkan features and the assumed common lexical items: the two language families share calques and proverbs, and display analogous phonetic changes, some of the latter especially shared between Tosk Albanian and Common Romanian.

Despite the similarities, genetically they are only distantly related Indo-European languages, as Albanian is the only surviving representative of the Albanoid branch that belongs to the Paleo-Balkan group, whence Eastern Romance languages are the only surviving representatives of the Balkan Vulgar Latin, belonging to the Italic branch.

== Overview ==
=== Albanian ===
Albanian dialects in Southern Europe

Forming a separate branch of the Indo-European language family, Albanian is spoken by about 6.5 million people in Albania and the nearby regions in Montenegro, Kosovo, Serbia, North Macedonia and Greece. Albanian has two main dialects, Gheg and Tosk, with the former spoken to the north of the river Shkumbin (Scampis) and the latter to the south of the river. Two varieties of the Tosk dialect, Arvanitika in Greece and Arbëresh in southern Italy, preserved archaic elements of the language. Gheg and Tosk which are primarily distinguished by phonological differences are mutually intelligible. Albanian is the only surviving representative of the Albanoid branch of Indo-European, which belongs to the Paleo-Balkan group.

Tosk/Gheg differentiation leading to regular correspondences, affect native words, Latin loans, and Classical Greek loans, but not Slavic loans, led researchers to the conclusion that the dialectal split preceded the Slavic migration to the Balkans. The Tosk/Gheg dialectal diversification was relatively old, dating back to the post-Roman first millennium.

=== Eastern Romance ===
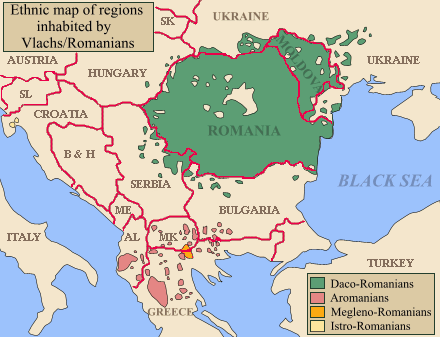
The four Eastern Romance languages in the early 20th century

Eastern Romance is a Romance language family spoken by about 25 million people primarily in Southeastern Europe. Its most spoken variant, Romanian (or Daco-Romanian), is the official language of Romania and Moldova. A second variant, Aromanian, is spoken by about 350,000 people in Albania, southwestern Bulgaria, northern Greece and North Macedonia. The third variant, Megleno-Romanian, exists in the Meglen region in southeastern North Macedonia and northern Greece. The fourth variant, Istro-Romanian, is spoken in eight settlements in Istria (in Croatia). The four variants developed from a common ancestor, known as Common Romanian. The venue of the formation of Proto-Romanian is debated. Some scholars propose that the Roman province of Dacia Traiana (which existed to the north of the Lower Danube from 106 AD to 271) was included in the Romanians' homeland. Other scholars say that Proto-Romanian descended from the Vulgar Latin spoken in the south-Danubian Roman provinces and the Romanians' ancestors started to settle in most regions of Romania only in the 12th century.

=== Balkan linguistic area ===
Albanian and Eastern Romance, along with Bulgarian and Macedonian, are the core members of the Balkan linguistic area—an area of linguistic convergence affecting six to eight languages in the Balkan Peninsula (in Southeastern Europe). Linguists also list the Torlakian dialect of Serbo-Croatian and Greek among the members of the same linguistic area. The membership of the Balkan dialects of Romani (or Gypsy) and of Turkish is debated, although they share some characteristics with the other idioms. Albanian and Eastern Romance share most Balkan features, but they also have common features which do not characterize other Balkan languages.

The existence of an unrounded central vowel—either a mid central vowel (ə) or a close central unrounded vowel (ɨ)—is the principal common phonological feature of most Balkan languages, although these vowels are not present in Greek and standard Macedonian. The loss or limited usage of infinitives characterizes all Balkan languages, but Albanian developed a new type after losing the inherited form. The postponed article is also a well-known Balkanism, missing only from Greek: for instance, Albanian nënë and nëna ("mother" and "the mother"), Bulgarian and Macedonian selo and seloto ("village" and "the village"), and Romanian om and omul ("man" and "the man"). Most Balkan languages use the auxiliary verb "want" when creating verbs in future tense and merged the dative and genitive cases in nominal declension.

== Literature ==
Johann Erich Thunmann, who published Theodore Kavalliotis' Greek–Aromanian–Albanian dictionary in 1774, was the first scholar to notice that Albanian and Aromanian share a number of elements of their vocabulary. Gustav Meyer listed most common lexical elements of the two languages in his Etymologisches Wörterbuch der albanesischen Sprache ("Etymological Dictionary of the Albanian Language") in 1891. The Romanian philologist Bogdan Petriceicu Hasdeu who studied the pre-Latin elements of the Romanian language came to the conclusion (in 1901) that the origin of the shared vocabulary was most probably to be searched in the earliest phase of the two peoples' ethnogenesis. Thereafter, a number of Romanian linguists—Alexandru Philippide, Alexandru Rosetti, Grigore Brâncuș and others—studied the similarities of Albanian and Romanian, especially in connection with their research on the origin of the Romanians. The Albanian linguist Eqrem Çabej was the first to emphasize the similar phonological and morphological elements of the two languages. He also drew attention to the similarities between Albanian and Romanian proverbs and the parallel development of the formation of sentences.

== Common features ==
=== Phonology ===
A common feature between Albanian and Eastern Romance (Aromanian and Old Romanian) is a distinction between simple r (tap r - ɾ) and intense r (trill r - r). Other features dated to the breakup of Romance languages that are shared between Albanian and Romanian include the merger of long /eː/ and short /i/, but not long /oː/ and short /u/ (most Romance languages either merged both or neither), and the replacement of /k/ in clusters /ks/ and /kt/ with a labial (p in Romanian, f in Albanian: see luctare > Albanian luftoj, Romanian lupta; Latin coxa > Albanian kofshë, Romanian coapsă). In the latter case, variation in Albanian outcomes has been explained as being the effect of loans entering Albanian at different times.

Proto-Albanian	Vulgar Latin
Late Proto-Albanian	Balkan; Proto-Romance
a > ə
Gheg Alb.	Tosk Alb.	Comm. Rom.
-n- > -r-
Tosk Alb.	Balk. Rom.	Balk. Rom. without -n- > -r-

The Tosk dialect of Albanian, spoken in Southern Albania, in particular is held to have experienced developments parallel to Common Romanian. These notably include the centralization of /a/ before nasals, rhotacism of intervocalic /n/ (regular in Tosk, limited to some varieties in Romanian: see lamina > lamura). It has been pointed out that /n/ rhotacism is present in other Romance languages such as Franco-Provençal, therefore this sound change is not necessarily a unique similarity between Albanian and Romanian. But among Albanian and Eastern Romance languages, those common innovation are limited only to some of their language varieties. Gheg Albanian apparently separated from the Proto-Albanian–Proto-Romanian contact zone before the rise of stressed ə < a. Some Eastern Romance varieties that do not display the rhotacism r < n apparently separated from the Proto-Romanian–Tosk Albanian contact zone before the rise of this phonetic change, which occurred before the 7th century CE (i.e. before contacts with Slavic). The interaction between Tosk and Romanian is held to have been the last stage of the crucial Albanian–Romanian period of convergence. Some words of the shared Albanian–Romanian lexicon, such as vatrë/vatră (both pronounced /ˈvatrə/), in Romanian are clearly borrowed from the Tosk Albanian and not the Gheg Albanian form.

=== Morphology ===
When comparing the morphological elements of the four core languages of the Balkan linguistic area, scholars have concluded that Albanian and Eastern Romance share most common features. Albanian and Eastern Romance use postponed articles with proper names, while this feature is absent from Bulgarian and Macedonian.

=== Lexicon ===
There are about one hundred words in Romanian that are cognate only with Albanian cognates (see Substrate in Romanian), though by lower estimates there are 70–90 possible substrate words with Albanian cognates, however a number of them are regarded as loanwords from Albanian.

According to Mihăescu, some 39 words of Latin origin are shared only by Albanian and Romanian, compared to more than 150 shared between Albanian and Western Romance languages, and 85 words were preserved only in Albanian.

== Proposed explanations ==
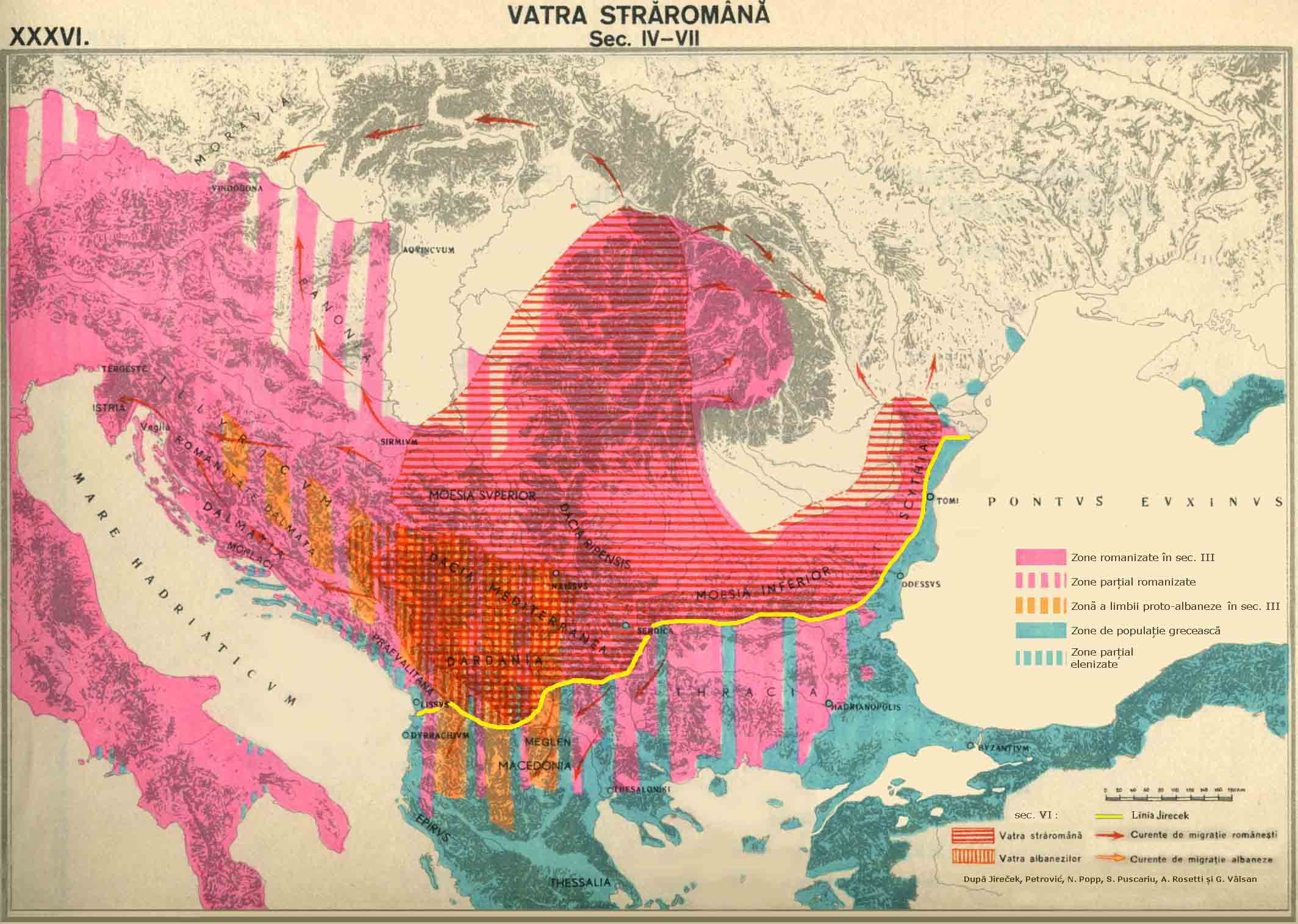
The Romanians' homeland (horizontal red lines in center) and their migrations (red arrows) in the 4th–7th centuries: a map presenting views of scholars who propose that the Romanians and their ancestors have continuously inhabited lands north of the Lower Danube (in present-day Romania) (Note: The map also depicts the "Jireček Line" (yellow), the Latin- and Greek-speaking territories (pink and blue areas, respectively), and the Albanians' supposed homeland (yellow areas).)

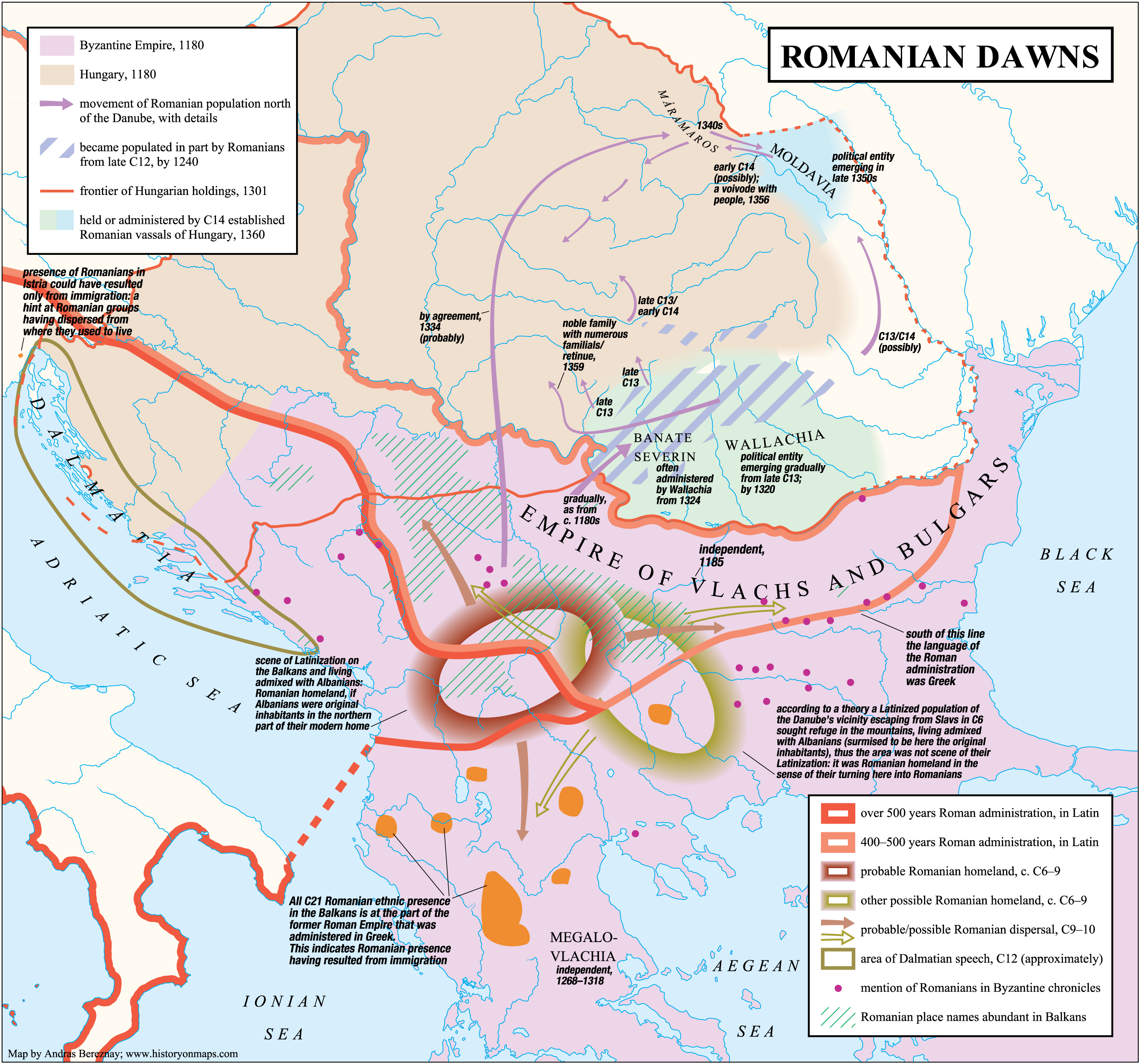
The Romanians' homeland and their medieval migrations (a map presenting views of scholars who propose that the Romanians' ethnogenesis started in the south-Danubian Roman provinces)

Hamp refers to an "Albanoid substratum" in Eastern Romance, arguing its early formation was shaped by language shift from an Albanoid language to Latin, which was also followed by borrowings from Albanian to Eastern Romance. Fine argues that the critical area of Albanian–Romanian contact was the valley of the river Great Morava in what is now eastern Serbia, before the Slavic invasions.

Noel Malcolm argues the Albanian–Eastern Romance contact area was in the Kosovo region and adjacent areas, within the ancient Illyrian region of Dardania, where both Albanian and Eastern Romance speakers appear during the medieval period. Dutch linguist Michiel de Vaan, although he does not reach to any definite conclusions, suggests the same thing.

Montenegrin highlands had a well-established Vlach-Romanian population by the early fourteenth century, when Vlach place-names are recorded there. And Albanian place-names.

Vlach-Romanian and Aromanian toponyms are present in the surrounding areas of Kosovo, such as Surdul in Southern Serbia. Toponyms such as Donji Katun, Gornji Katun, Katun (Aleksinac) Katun (Vranje) in Southern Serbia, Katun, Pljevlja, Katun Božički and Katun Nahija in Montenegro include the word Katun, which is a rural self-governing community traditional of the living style of Albanians and Eastern Romance people in the western Balkans. Katun means 'village' in the Albanian, Aromanian and Romanian language.

Other scholars have differentiated different groups of Latin loans in Albanian representing different stages and historical scenarios. Albanian/Latin convergence began during the first century CE, with the dating of Latin loans used to differentiate between Early Proto-Albanian (just before initial imperial Latin contact) and Late Proto-Albanian (at the time of contact with Proto-Romance). There has also been a distinction between later convergence with different Romance languages in Albanian. Romanian scholars Vatasescu and Mihaescu, using lexical analysis of the Albanian language, have concluded that Albanian was also heavily influenced by an extinct Romance language that was distinct from both Romanian and Dalmatian. Because the Latin words common to only Romanian and Albanian are significantly less than those that are common to only Albanian and Western Romance, Mihaescu argues that the Albanian language evolved in a region with much greater contact to Western Romance regions than to Romanian-speaking regions, and located this region in present-day Albania, Kosovo and western North Macedonia, spanning east to Bitola and Pristina.

== See also ==
- Albania–Romania relations
- Aromanians in Albania
- Balkan sprachbund
- Eastern Romance languages
- History of Romanian

== Bibliography ==
- Augerot, J. (2009). "Romanian". In Brown, Keith; Ogilvie, Sarah (eds.). Concise Encyclopedia of Languages of the World. Elsevier. pp. 900–904. ISBN 978-0-08-087774-7.
- Bednarczuk, Leszek (2023). "On certain phonetic balkanisms". Rocznik Slawistyczny. LXXII: 41–46. doi:10.24425/rslaw.2023.147254. ISSN 0080-3588.
- Demiraj, B.; Esposito, A. (2009). "Albanian". In Brown, Keith; Ogilvie, Sarah (eds.). Concise Encyclopedia of Languages of the World. Elsevier. pp. 22–24. ISBN 978-0-08-087774-7.
- Fortson, Benjamin W. (2004). Indo-European Language and Culture: An Introduction. Blackwell Publishing. ISBN 978-1-4051-0315-2.
- Friedman, Victor A. (2009). "The Diffusion of Macedonian Inflections into Megleno-romanian: a reconsideration of the evidence" (PDF). In Franks, Steven; Chidambaram, Vrinda; Joseph, Brian (eds.). A Linguist's Linguist: Studies in South Slavic Linguistics in Honor of E. Wayles Browne. Slavica. pp. 223–233. ISBN 978-0-89357-364-5.
- Hamp, Eric P. (1963). "The Position of Albanian". University of California.
- Isac, Daniela (2024). Definiteness in Balkan Romance. Oxford Studies in Theoretical Linguistics. Oxford University Press. ISBN 9780198865704.
- Petrucci, Peter R. (1999). Slavic Features in the History of Rumanian. Lincom Europa. ISBN 3-89586-599-0.
- Prendergast, Eric (2017). The Origin and Spread of Locative Determiner Omission in the Balkan Linguistic Area (Ph.D). UC Berkeley.
- Rusakov, Alexander (2013). "Некоторые изоглоссы на албанской диалектной карте (К вопросу о возникновении и распространении балканизмов албанского языка)" [Some isoglosses on the Albanian dialectal map (On the issue of the emergence and spread of Balkanisms of the Albanian language)]. Исследования по типологии славянских, балтийских и балканских языков (преимущественно в свете языковых контактов) [Studies in the Typology of Slavic, Baltic and Balkan Languages (with primary reference to language contact)] (in Russian). Aletheia. pp. 113–174.
- Sala, Marius (2005). From Latin to Romanian: The Historical Development of Romanian in a Comparative Romance Context. University, Mississippi. ISBN 1-889441-12-0.
- Schramm, Gottfried (1997). Ein Damm bricht. Die römische Donaugrenze und die Invasionen des 5-7. Jahrhunderts in Lichte der Namen und Wörter [A Dam Breaks: The Roman Danube frontier and the Invasions of the 5th–7th Centuries in the Light of Names and Words] (in German). R. Oldenbourg Verlag. ISBN 978-3-486-56262-0.
- Schütz, István (2002). Fehér foltok a Balkánon: Bevezetés az albanológiába és a balkanisztikába [Black Spots on in the Balkans: An Introduction to Albanology and Balkan Studies]. Balassi Kiadó. ISBN 9635064721.
- Thomason, Sarah Grey (2001). Language Contact. Edinburgh University Press. ISBN 978-0-7486-0719-8.
