= Battles of Batočina and Jagodina =

Battle of the First Serbian Uprising

- Part of the First Serbian Uprising
Date	20 March–16 April 1804
Location	Batočina, Ćuprija and Jagodina, Ottoman Empire (today Serbia)
Result	Serbian victory
Territorial changes	Jagodina in rebel hands

Belligerents
Serbian rebels	Dahije (Ottoman Empire) Ottoman city garrison

Commanders and leaders
Karađorđe; Milan Obrenović; Mladen Milovanović	Kučuk-Alija; Tosun-aga; Husein Ganić †; Alija Gušanac

Units involved
Combined nahija troops	Janissaries kırcalı Jagodina deli and local soldiers

Strength
600+	1,000–2,000

Casualties and losses
150+ killed, 50+ wounded, and 20 captured	700+ killed

The Battles of Batočina and Jagodina were several battles fought in late March–April in Batočina and Jagodina (central Serbia) between the Serbian rebels under Karađorđe and the Dahije (renegade Janissaries) leader Kučuk-Alija. The Serbian rebels aimed to take Jagodina while Kučuk-Alija mustered and hired troops in the region to deal with the rebellion. The Batočina inn was besieged to stop reinforcements and led to a pursuit and destruction of a Janissary contingent at a river bank. Next, a siege of Jagodina, held by Kučuk-Alija, failed miserably due to bad weather conditions. The next attack was successful after an assault and day of shootouts in the town.

== Background ==
The besieged Rudnik received news that Kučuk-Alija, one of the four leading Dahije, left Belgrade with a Janissary army to fight the Serbs. Rudnik was taken by 6 March, and the participating troops were then dispersed and sent to rest, to then gather at Vrbica and setting out for Jagodina. Kučuk-Alija had 500–600 men that were to aid Sali-aga at Rudnik and then to muster an army of mercenaries to deal with the Serbian rebels, in that way, attacking the rebels from the south of the Pashalik and Belgrade. On the way, Kučuk-Alija was informed that Rudnik was in rebel hands and that Karađorđe was at Vrbica with a small number of men awaiting the rebel army, so he proceeded to attack on 14 March, and in a short battle Karađorđe lost some men but retreated into safety in the mountains, while Kučuk-Alija went to Kragujevac to deter the Serbs in the area from rising up and mustering more troops.

On 15 March [O.S. 4 March] 1804, the rebel army gathered at Vrbica, with Milan Obrenović and Arsenije Loma and other commanders. The larger part of the army was sent to pursue Kučuk-Alija towards Kragujevac, while the rest was sent into the Belgrade nahija to rise up and gather more troops. At Vračar, the Belgrade Turks sortied and were defeated by Karađorđe's troops. Karađorđe messaged Vasa Čarapić to hold the road below the Avala mountain and the surroundings of Belgrade, while he went for the Smederevo area to join with Đuša Vulićević and then divided his troops to block Smederevo, and went with his personal guard (momci) to Batočina where Kučuk-Alija had sent Husein Ganić with 250 Arnauts. Karađorđe asked Milan Obrenović to go to Topola with the Rudnik nahija rebel army and then continue to Jagodina. According to Matija Nenadović's Memoirs, Kučuk-Alija went from Kragujevac to Jagodina and Niš and collected kırcalı (bandits, mercenaries) who he set up at Jagodina.

The Ćuprija and Jagodina nahiyas were strategically and economically important, with the Ćuprija bridge being the most important crossing of the Morava river to the Constantinople Road. Ćuprija had a garrison of 1,500–2,000, with a large war magazine, while Jagodina had a garrison of 600–700 well-armed soldiers in trenches around the town and the watchtower on Đurđevo Brdo, and a factory for knives and yatagans. All of the Jagodina nahiya, except the town and villages in Temnić, was held in rebel hands by the end of February. In the beginning and mid-March, the Dahije were informed that the Jagodina nahiya roads were full of insurgents, the town Muslims were afraid to leave town, some village houses were burnt down and the subaşi in Batočina was killed and the Serbs were disobedient and refused to pay taxes. Mehmed-aga Fočić promised to send troops to Jagodina. Dahije commander in the area, Abd-aga, wrote to Fočić that the Serbs were unwilling to stand down but believed that he could suppress them with the coming aid of 400 Janissaries from Leskovac via Paraćin.

An Austrian report dated 20 March noted that "all Serbs took up weapons" and were holding the Morava towards Palanka, Jagodina and Rudnik, under the command of Karađorđe, Stevan Jakovljević, Stojko Krivokuća and Mladen Milovanović.

== History ==
=== Batočina and Kijevo ===
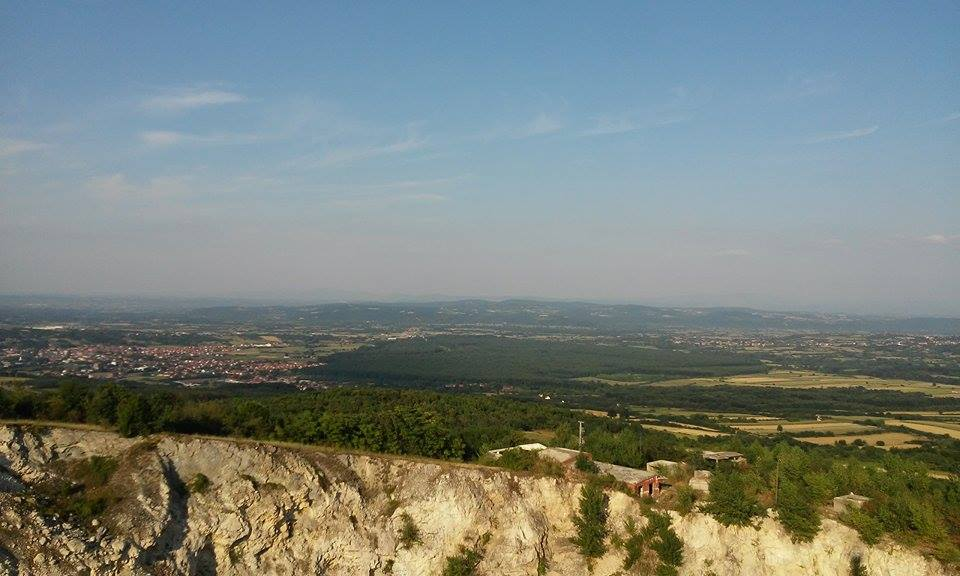
View of Rogot and part of Batočina.

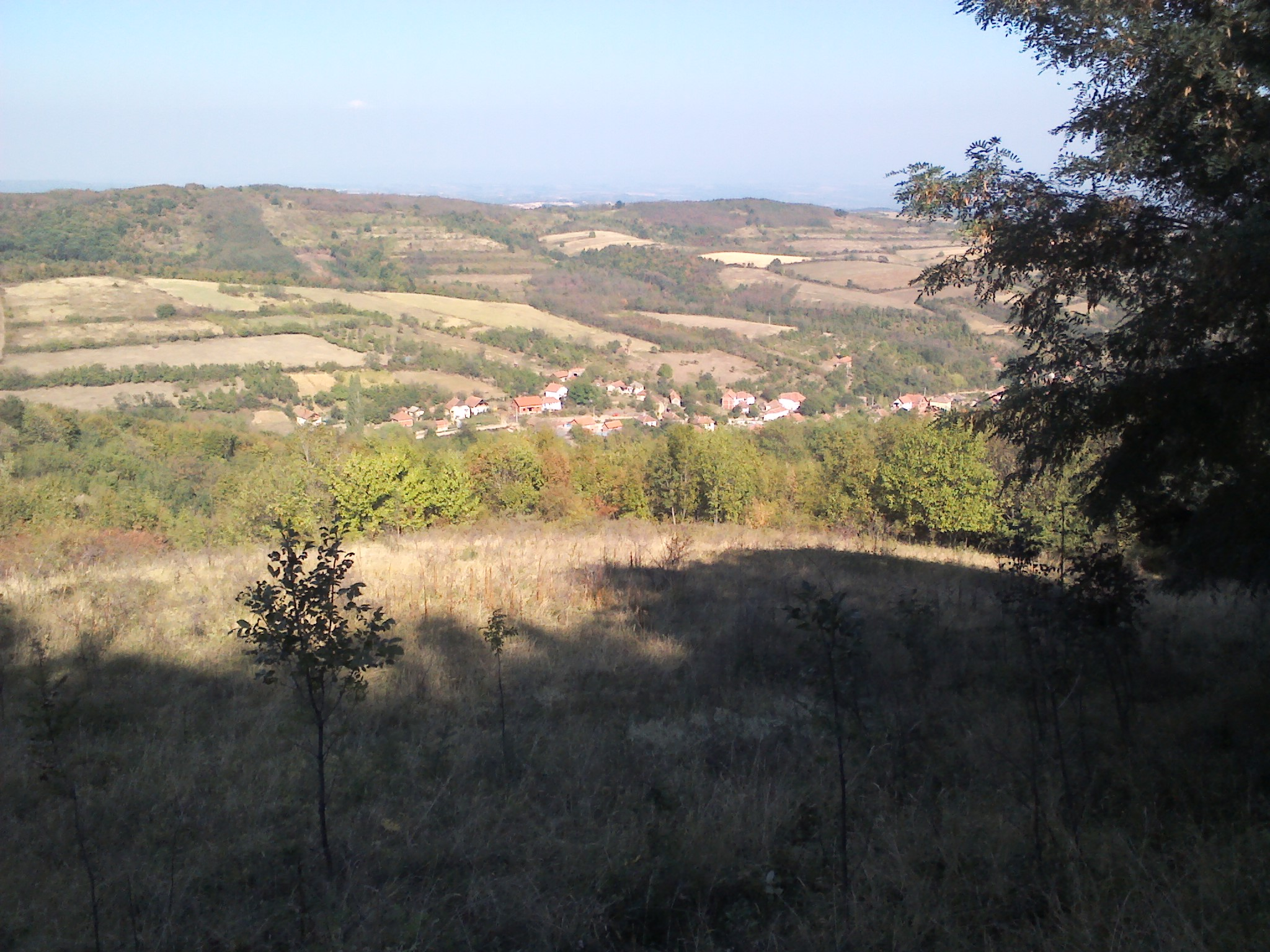
View of Štiplje.

Kučuk-Alija sent the 250 Arnauts to Batočina to take over the inns and protect the road to Belgrade, while he went to Paraćin and Niš to collect more kırcalı. Karađorđe, now leading an army mustered in the Belgrade and Smederevo nahiyas, attacked the Arnauts, who then fortified in the inns. They were engaged from the afternoon until the next morning, and the attack proved unsuccessful. Karađorđe left Batočina in siege and went with Stanoje Glavaš and a unit towards Jagodina. According to P. Jokić, Karađorđe went to Bagrdan and the second day to Štiplje to rest. According to K. Protić he arrived at Štiplje on 21 March [O.S. 9 March] 1804. Milan Obrenović arrived with the Rudnik nahija troops at Štiplje. Kučuk-Alija learnt the siege and in the night sent the Dahije commander Tosun-aga with 500 good cavalry to take the road leading from Jagodina to Bagrdan and Batočina and then lift the siege and together counter Karađorđe. The unit of knez Teodosije Marićević at Lipar didn't notice Tosun-aga's troops going by the road, and a sentry then heard that a couple of men carrying food to the rebels were killed by enemy troops heading to Batočina. K. Protić blamed this on Teodosije's military inexperience in camping too far from the road.

Karađorđe immediately gathered troops and went for Batočina, where however Tosun-aga had already dispersed the small number of besiegers and set up camp with the Arnauts. Among Serb losses were Serdar Sima from Darosava, one of Karađorđe's pobratim (blood brother). Collecting the dispersed, Karađorđe gathered at the height above Batočina and sent most infantry to set up ambuscades by the Jagodina road, and stayed with the rest of infantry and 600 cavalry in the hills. The knez Đuka of Jagnjilo was set up by the Jagodina road in the Rogot forest. The rebels waited all night for Kučuk-Alija's order to the troops at Batočina to move towards Jagodina, and at dawn, they began to leave Batočina. Karađorđe awaited a space to push them from behind into an ambush, but they noticed that the road had been trampled by rebel infantry and sensing an ambush, detoured towards Kijevo. They were pursued from behind by Karađorđe's men to the Kijevo stream, where all of the Arnaut infantry was destroyed and some Janissary cavalry killed. Tosun-aga's horse was trapped in the stream and his men put him on another one and thus saved him from being captured. His noble horse was gifted to Karađorđe. There were up to 400 dead enemies, including the notable Husein Ganić from the Peć nahiya and Jusuf-aga Klimentić.

According to Janićije Đurić the battles in Batočina took place on 20–21 and 22 March [O.S. 8–9 and 10 March], however, S. Novaković concluded that it was at least 7–8 days later. An Austrian report dated 27 March [O.S. 15 March] claims that 1,500 kırcalı were surrounded and defeated outside Jagodina.

=== Ćuprija ===
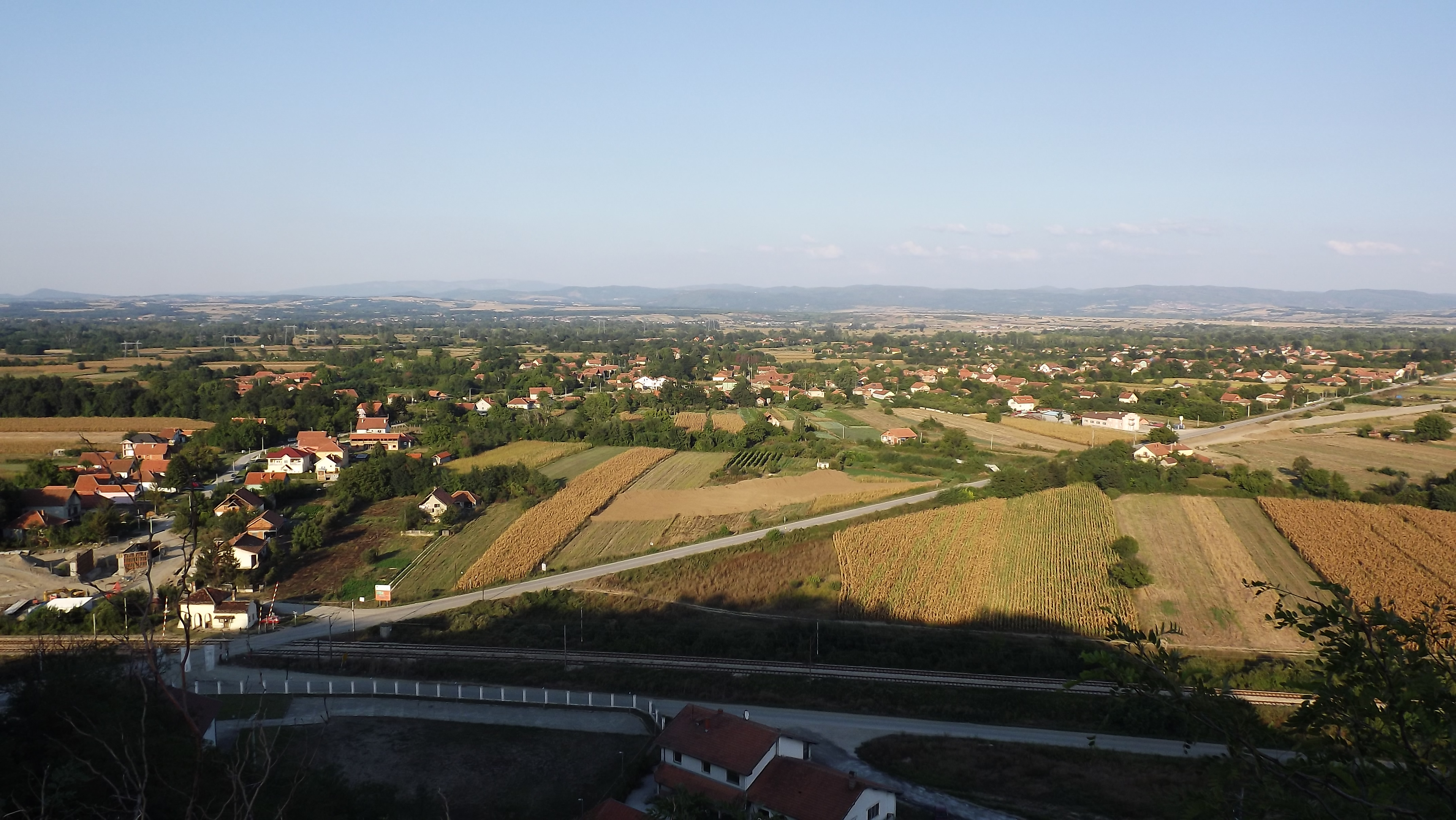
View of Mijatovac from the Gilje hill.

The kırcalı under Alija Gušanac were thwarted 2–3 times from breaking through to Belgrade. They moved in the Ćuprija area. 320 rebels in ambush attacked Gušanac's 800–900 men at Duboki Potok by the Morava river near Ćuprija on 23 March [O.S. 11 March]. The Serb detachment included Todor-Stojko Krivokuća, Petar Dobrnjac, Paulj Matejić, Milovan Resavac, Stevan Sinđelić and Milija Zdravković. The kırcalı had 80 killed, many wounded, and Gušanac's horse fell. Dobrnjac and Paulj distinguished themselves in the battle. Although the accounts claim that Gušanac earlier asked the rebels to hire him, he was already hired by the Dahije from Belgrade. An Austrian report dated 26 March [O.S. 14 March] claims that Gušanac had offered his service to the Serbs in Ćuprija. In an epic poem of Sarajlija, there was an attack by rebels led by Stojko Krivokuća on Gušanac, and he connected it directly to Batočina.

In another battle, when Gušanac tried to break through the Morava towards Jagodina, the rebels camping near the Gilje hill (overlooking Mijatovac) commanded by Mladen Milovanović first assaulted with cavalry and quickly forced the kırcalı to retreat into an ambush and fight for several hours, being pushed to the right banks of the Morava. After the defeat at Gilje, they tried to push through by the right Morava banks via Svilajnac to Požarevac, but were countered by the Resava army under Milovan Resavac at the Hum hill and forced back to Ćuprija. Gušanac managed to break through to Jagodina in late March, owing partly to the weak Serbian defensive points around the town.

=== Jagodina ===
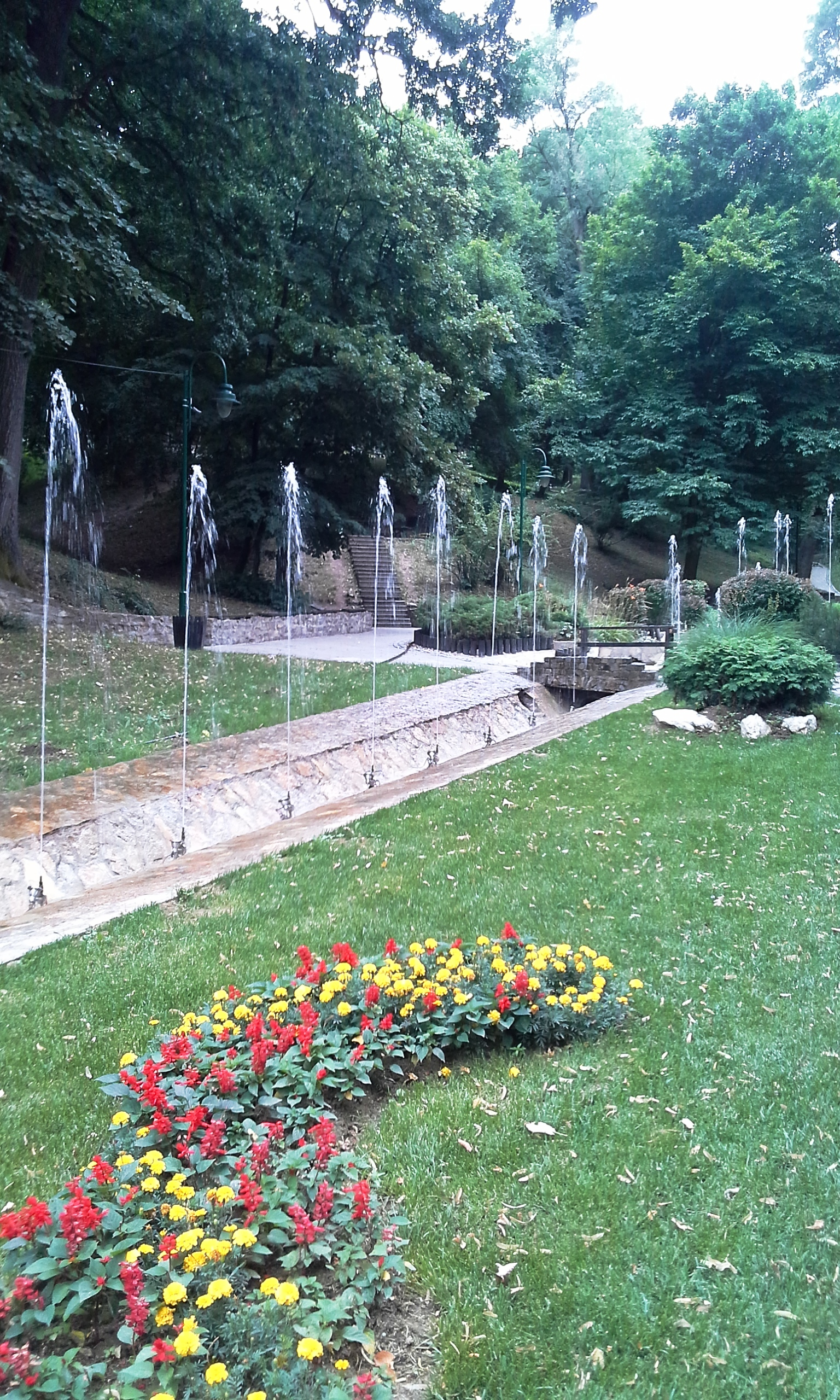
Đurđevo Brdo, now a park in Jagodina.

After Kijevo, Karađorđe returned to Štiplje and planned for the attack on Jagodina. He sent Milan and Mladen with the Rudnik and Kragujevac troops to set out for Crveno Brdo in the morning, while he took his men and the Levač troops to Đurđevo Brdo. The plan was for the Turks to attack first and that either contingent then attack from the rear. Arriving at Đurđevo, the Turks immediately attacked with a strong force of cavalry and infantry, at a time when Alija Gušanac had begun engaging rebels elsewhere. The rebels managed and pushed the Turks back to Jagodina, and burnt down the closest Turk houses. The rebels around the town began to set houses on fire and pillage, but they were easily pushed back towards Đurđevo, with many losses. This was the time when Milan and Mladen should have aided and assaulted from behind, however, the Belica river flooded and poured and the only crossing was a bridge in Turk hands, and only a small number of men crossed over on willows, to no help. After dealing with the Serbs at Đurđevo, the Turks crossed the Belica bridge and attacked Milan and Mladen and dispersed them from Crveno Brdo. S. Novaković concluded that this battle took place around the last day of March. The Serbs had many losses and were dispersed; 150 dead, 50 wounded, and 20 captured, including Petar Kara and hajduk Milovan from Plana. Kučuk-Alija released the captives and recommended them to deter their people from rebellion. Gušanac went to Belgrade while Kučuk-Alija stayed in Jagodina, likely awaiting reinforcements. Karađorđe again collected the dispersed and reorganized.

After the first battle at Jagodina, the Serbian rebels mustered a new army and planned for a better attack. Matija Nenadović went from the siege of Šabac to Orašac to hand over a letter for Karađorđe and was informed on 1–3 April by Sima Marković and Teodosije Marićević on the defeat and the mustering for a new attack. Karađorđe personally went to Temnić and Levač and collected men and rose all of the Jagodina nahiya. Around 16 April the second battle took place, with an assault led by Karađorđe on Jagodina, where Kučuk-Alija was fortified. The town was encircled. The shootouts in the streets took a whole day, and the rebels broke through and set houses on fire, killed 300, captured many, and forced Kučuk-Alija to flee, barely surviving, with the rest of his troops successfully breaking through the gates held by Mladen (who was accused of having let him through). Karađorđe informed Austrian contact Mitesser about the defeat of Turks at Batočina and Jagodina in a letter dated 16 April 1804.

== Aftermath and legacy ==
After the victory, Karađorđe pursued Kučuk-Alija through Šumadija, while Milan Obrenović and the Rudnik rebels were returned to the Rudnik nahiya. Karađorđe appointed commanders in the Jagodina nahiya and ordered them to watch Ćuprija. By now, only Belgrade, Smederevo and Požarevac were among important cities held by the Janissaries, all blocked by the rebels. The battles of Batočina and Jagodina became epic poems.

After the arrival of Bosnian Vizier Bekir Pasha in Belgrade in July 1804, the assassination of the Dahije leaders, and ceasefire, the remainder of Jagodina Turks left voluntarily for Ćuprija, Paraćin, Ražanj, Kruševac, Niš, Leskovac, Prokuplje, and bachelors and homeless joined Gušanac in Belgrade.

== See also ==
- Timeline of the Serbian Revolution

== Sources ==
- Batalaka, Lazar Arsenijević (1898). Историја српског устанка [History of the Serbian Uprising]. Vol. I. Izd. Batalakinoga fonda.
- Jovanović, Dobrivoje (2014) [2009]. "ПРВЕ БОРБЕ СА ТУРЦИМА И ОСЛОБОЂЕЊЕ ЈАГОДИНЕ 1804.ГОДИНЕ" (PDF). Прошлост. 3. Историјски архив Јагодина.
- Jovanović, Dobrivoje (2005). "Борбе код Баточине 1804. године" (PDF). Митолошки зборник. 13. Рача: 59–. ISBN 86-83829-20-0.
- Nenadović, Konstantin N. (1884). Живот и дела великог Ђорђа Петровића Кара-Ђорђа [Life and Deeds of Great Đorđe Petrović Kara-Đorđe]. Vol. II (1 ed.). Vienna: У Штампарији Јована Н. Вернаја – via Google Books.
- Nenadović, Konstantin N. (1903) [1883]. Живот и дела великог Ђорђа Петровића Кара-Ђорђа [Life and Deeds of Great Đorđe Petrović Kara-Đorđe]. Vol. I (2 ed.). Belgrade: Штампа Савића и Комп. – via Archive.org.
- Novaković, Stojan (1904). Устанак на дахије 1804 [Uprising against the Dahije]. Штампано у Државној штампарији – via Archive.org.
- Protić, Kosta (1893). "Ратни догађаји из првога српског устанка под Карађорђем Петровићем 1804—1813". Годишњица Николе Чупића. XIII. Državna štamparija: 114–116.
