= Istrian Albanian =

Extinct Gheg Albanian dialect of Istria

- Istra Albanian
- Native to: Croatia
- Region: Istria
- Ethnicity: Istrian Albanians
- Extinct: 19th century
- Language family: Indo-European: Albanoid; Albanian; Gheg; Northern; Northwestern; Istrian Albanian

Language codes
- ISO 639-3: –
- Glottolog: istr1247

Istrian Albanian is an extinct variety of Gheg Albanian that was spoken in the village of Katun in the area of Poreč, Istria.

== History ==
From the 13th to the 17th century the depopulation of the Istrian Peninsula prompted the Republic of Venice to repopulate the region with settlers, which among others included Albanians and the Albanian language. The coalescence of the various dialects spoken by the settlers led to the formation of the Istrian Albanian dialect. The only surviving text of the dialect was written by the local scholar Pietro Stancovich in the 1830s. Stankovich recorded a version of the Parable of the Prodigal Son and a vocabulary list of the dialect.
