= Marenovo =

- Village
- Location within Serbia
- Coordinates: 43°41′47″N 21°14′25″E
- Country: Serbia
- District: Rasina District
- Municipality: Varvarin

Population (2002)
  - Total: 453
- Time zone: UTC+1 (CET)
  - Summer (DST): UTC+2 (CEST)

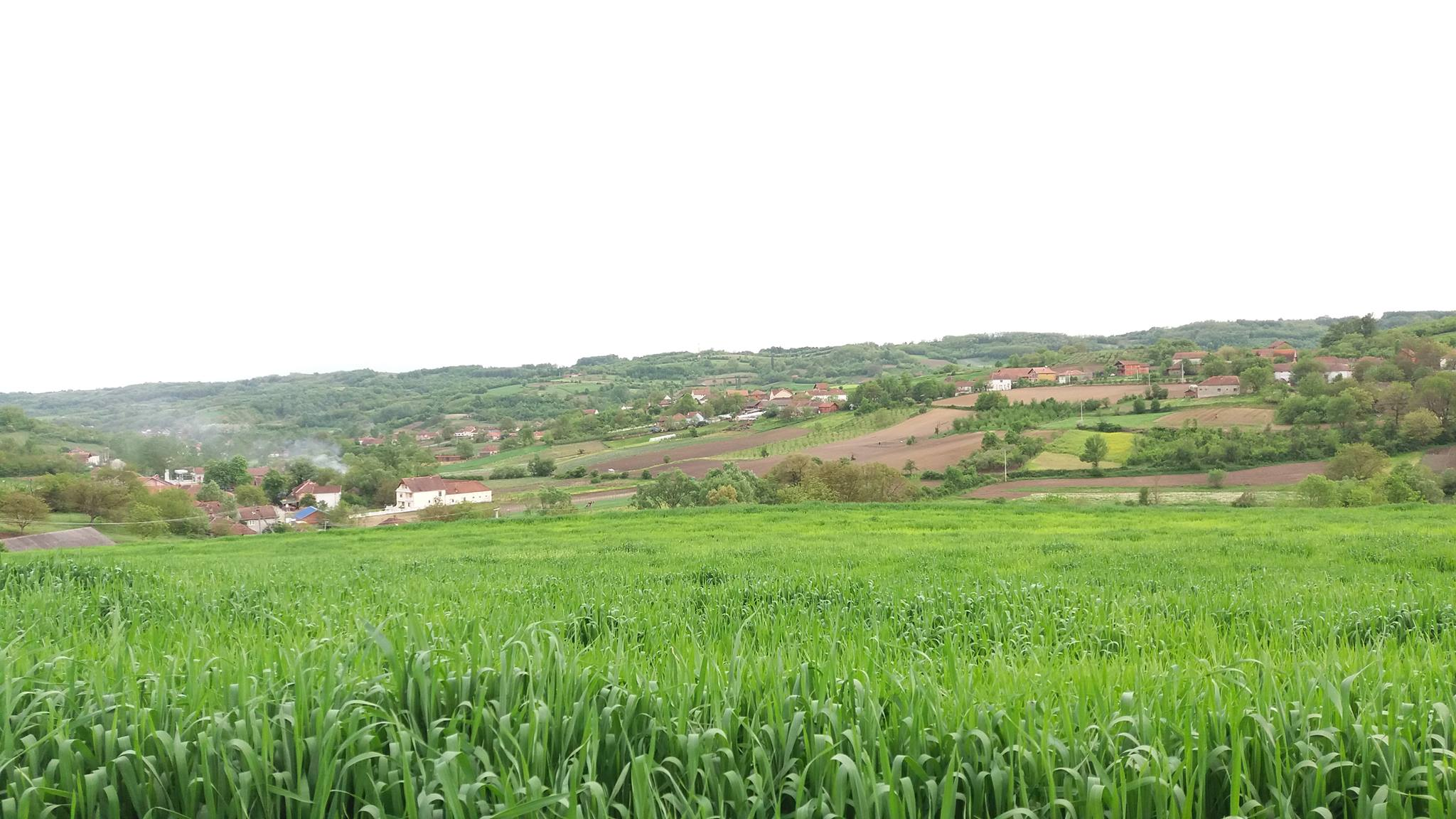

Marenovo is a village in the municipality of Varvarin, Serbia. According to the 2002 census, the village has a population of 453 people.
