= Zalogovac =

- Village
- Location within Serbia
- Coordinates: 43°41′25″N 21°15′06″E
- Country: Serbia
- District: Rasina District
- Municipality: Varvarin

Population (2002)
  - Total: 881
- Time zone: UTC+1 (CET)
  - Summer (DST): UTC+2 (CEST)

Zalogovac is a village in the municipality of Varvarin, Serbia.

According to the 2002 census, the village has a population of 881 people.
