= Izbenica =

- Village
- Location within Serbia
- Coordinates: 43°45′35″N 21°16′41″E
- Country: Serbia
- District: Rasina District
- Municipality: Varvarin

Population (2002)
  - Total: 531
- Time zone: UTC+1 (CET)
  - Summer (DST): UTC+2 (CEST)

Izbenica is a village in the municipality of Varvarin, Serbia. According to the 2002 census, the village has a population of 531 people.
