= Temnić inscription =

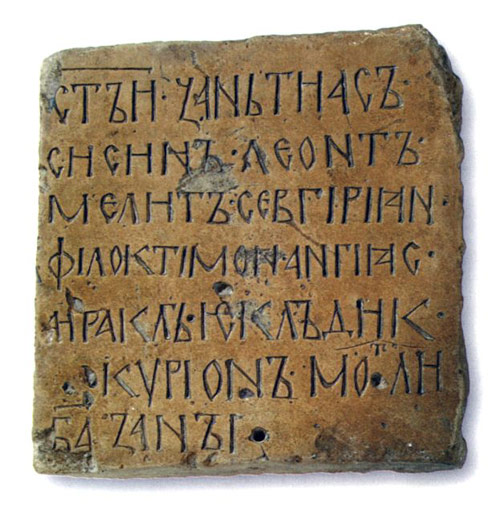
Temnić inscription

The Temnić inscription (Serbian: Темнићки натпис, romanized: Temnićki natpis) is one of the oldest records of medieval Serbian redaction of the Old Church Slavonic Cyrillic script from the territory of modern Serbia, dated to the late 10th, or early 11th century. It contains the form of accusative singular noun God (бога instead of богь), characteristic of Serbian recension of the Old Church Slavonic language. The limestone plate was discovered in the vicinity of a school in the village of Gornji Katun, near Varvarin, in the region of Temnić in Pomoravlje. It was acquired by the National Museum of Serbia in 1909. The tablet represents a scientific conundrum as no other remains of an edifice were found and paleographic and linguistic analysis of the text reveals little information.

== Description ==
Original text (original, Romanized, & modernized Cyrillic) (/ denote line breaks)	С(вѧ)тъ(і)и · Ꙁаньтиасъ ·/ Cисинъ · Леонтъ ·/ Мелитъ · Севгіріꙗн ·/ Филоктимон · Ангіꙗс ·/ Иракꙥь · Ѥклъдик ·/ Кѵріонъ · молиⷮ(е) / Б(ог)а ꙁа нꙑ S(vę)tъ(j)i Zanьtiasъ, Sisinъ, Leontъ, Melitъ, Sevgirijan, Filoktimon, Angijas, Iraklь, Jeklъdik, Kirionъ, molit(e) B(og)a za ny Свети Зањтиас, Сисин, Леонт, Мелит, Севгиријан, Филоктимон, Ангијас, Иракљ, Јеклдик, Кирион, молите Бога за ны!
Modern Serbian (Cyrillic & Latin)	Свети Ксантије, Сисиније, Леонтије, Мелитон, Северијан, Филоктимон, Ангије, Ираклије, Екдикт, и Кирион, молите Бога за нас! Sveti Ksantije, Sisinije, Leontije, Meliton, Severian, Filoktimon, Angije, Iraklije, Ekdikt, i Kirion, molite Boga za nas!
English translation	Saints Xanthius, Sisinnius, Leontius, Melito, Severianus, Philotimo, Angius, Heraclius, Ecdicius, Cyrio: pray God for us!

The inscription on the plate was skillfully engraved in uncial Cyrillic in seven rows. …

Researchers do not agree on the original purpose of the plate or the place where it was found. Some of them believe that the content and the shape of the inscription indicate it was engraved into the holy table of the church it belonged to. Others think that it made one whole tablet along with the other three plates with the names of the remaining thirty martyrs. Medieval builders believed that the forty martyrs from Sebaste had magic powers, and that the edifice would be protected from collapsing if they were painted and their names were written on it.

Given the paleographic characteristics of the script and the linguistic analysis of the text, most of the researchers believe that the Тemnićki natpis dates to the 11th century. This epigraph of an anonymous stonemason, according to orthographic analysis, shows similarity with all old Slavic Cyrillic engravings. It thus is considered proof that Cyrillic script was used very early along with Glagolitic script.

— National Museum in Belgrade,

== See also ==
- Medieval Serbian inscriptions

== Sources ==
- Bataković, Dušan T., ed. (2005). Histoire du peuple serbe. Lausanne: L’Age d’Homme. ISBN 9782825119587.
- Gavrilović, Zaga (2001). Studies in Byzantine and Serbian Medieval Art. London: The Pindar Press. ISBN 9781899828340.
