= Battle of Vrbica =

Battle part of the first Serbian uprising

- Part of the First Serbian Uprising
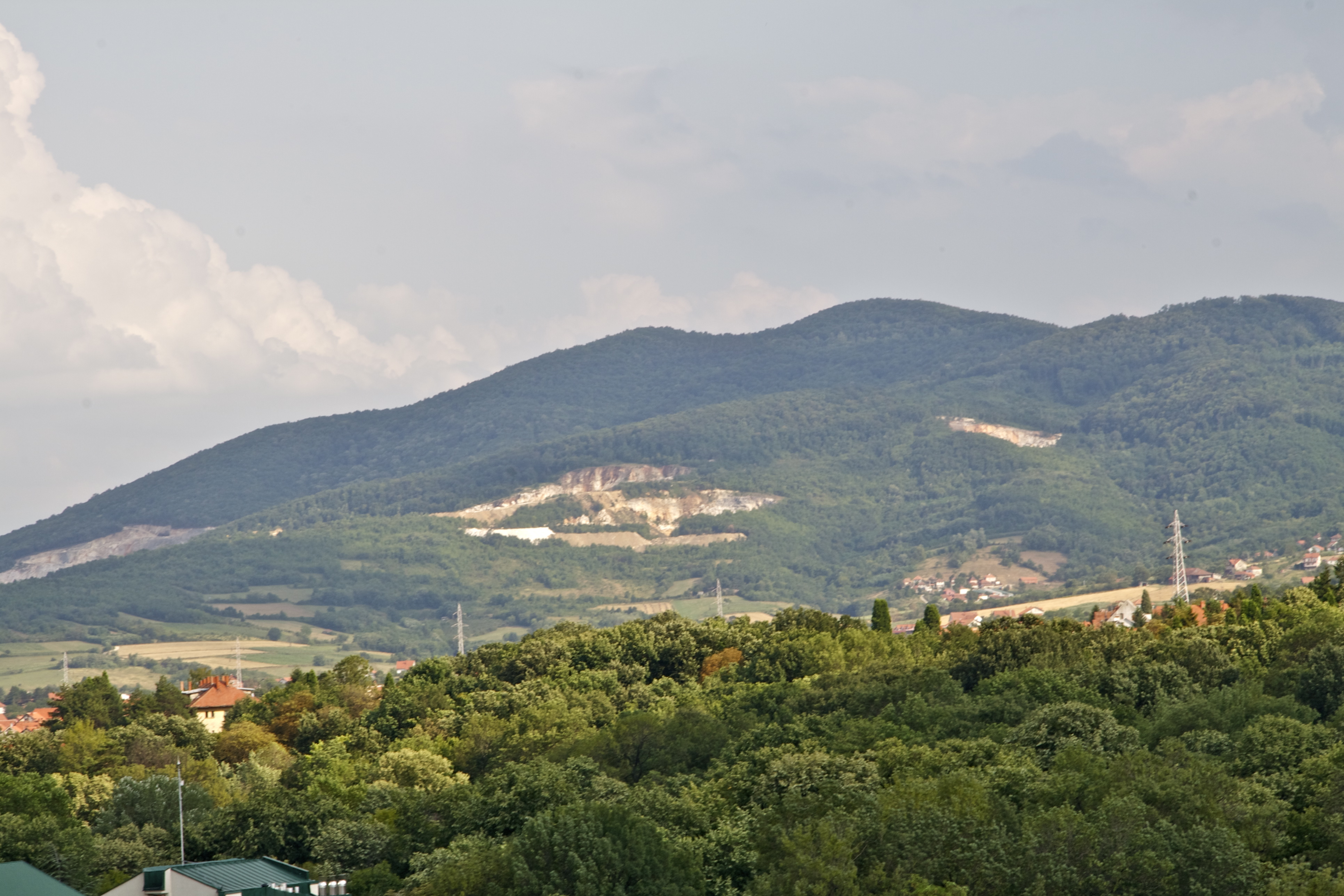
- View of Venčac mountain
Date	14 March 1804
Location	Vrbica, Sanjak of Smederevo, Ottoman Empire (today Serbia)
Result	Dahije victory

Belligerents
Dahije	Serbian rebels

Commanders and leaders
Kučuk-Alija	Karađorđe

Units involved
Janissaries	Karađorđe's personal guard

Strength
500–600	50, 100 or 200

Casualties and losses
Unknown	13+ dead, and wounded

The Battle of Vrbica (Serbian: Бој на Врбици/Boj na Vrbici) was a clash between the Dahije (renegade Janissaries) leader Kučuk-Alija and the Serbian rebel unit of supreme commander Karađorđe in March 1804 near Vrbica in the valley of the Venčac mountain. It took place during the resting and gathering of rebel troops to begin operations in the Jagodina area, meanwhile, the Dahije set out to relieve Rudnik and employ mercenaries, not knowing it was already in rebel hands. An informant gave up the location of Karađorđe.

== Background ==
After the takeover of Rudnik on 6 March, supreme commander Karađorđe sent the Rudnik nahija detachment of Arsenije Loma, Milić Drinčić and Lazar Mutap to rest and then gather at Vrbica for the takeover of Jagodina, and Milan Obrenović, the starešina (chief) of the Rudnik nahija, was sent to further arm the Rudnik nahija and then to also gather at Vrbica. Karađorđe's troops rested at Stragari and had three-days leave and then went to Vrbica where they awaited the others. Jagodina was in the rebel plans, made at the Orašac Assembly on 14 February [O.S. 2 February] 1804.

== History ==
The Dahije were alarmed by growing rebel numbers and operations and thus decided to send Kučuk-Alija, one of their four main leaders, with 500–600 or 600 men (dubbed hatlije, from kabahat, "criminals") to aid Sali-aga at Rudnik and then to muster an army of mercenaries in Arnautluk (Muslim Albanian-inhabited territories) to deal with the Serbian rebels. In that way, the Dahije would attack the rebels from the south of the Pashalik and Belgrade. Kučuk-Alija took the route towards Venčac as it was the fastest to Rudnik. On the way, Kučuk-Alija learnt from knez Maksim from Guberevac that Rudnik had been taken over and burnt down by the Serbs and that the Turks had left the town, and that Karađorđe was at Vrbica with a small number of men awaiting the rebel army. With the quick taking of Rudnik, the rebels had saved themselves from being attacked from two sides.

Karađorđe was with 50, 100, or around 200 men near Vrbica in the valley of the Venčac mountain. Among his men were buljubaša (captain) Petar Jokić, the leader of Karađorđe's personal guard, Janko Katić, and Gaja Pantelić. Kučuk-Alija went on the Orašac road in the evening of 12 March [O.S. 1 March] 1804, while Karađorđe was at the other side of Vrbica, in a plain below the Venčac. Serb lookouts saw Kučuk-Alija approaching with 500–600 cavalry on the Orašac road.

Arriving in the area, Kučuk-Alija immediately attacked, first the Serbian lookouts, then Karađorđe went and engaged. The Dahije tried to encircle them, but Karađorđe and his men went up the Venčac and Bukulja mountains (Bukovička planina), the Dahije unable or not wanting to pursue them; it was risky, and the Dahije perhaps feared attacks from Serb cheta (bands) in the deep groves and forests. The battle took an hour, or was "short". The rebels had 13 dead, and wounded. Karađorđe's cargo horse with weapon tools and his personal fur coat was taken by the Dahije.

As night fell, the Dahije camped at a konak (mansion) in Vrbica. That night had been chosen as the gathering time for the Serb troops; Karađorđe sent men to the nearby roads to make sure that the people wouldn't go to Vrbica, as earlier decided, but to Venčac, which was safe. Karađorđe sent part of his men to the Rudnik road, to possibly intercept the Dahije there, and went with the rest into Vrbica, to attack the resting Dahije. Approaching Vrbica, they saw that it was empty; Kučuk-Alija had only rested his horses a while, then set out for Kragujevac. According to a local participant, included in Matija Nenadović's Memoirs, someone alarmed that the Turks went on the Pločnik road, and a detachment hurried and captured an ambuscade, but learnt that it was a deception by "perhaps Maksim ... who escorted him [Kučuk-Alija] everywhere". Karađorđe didn't know that Kučuk-Alija had been informed of the fall of Rudnik.

In the night, and the next day, 15 March [O.S. 4 March] 1804, the rebel army gathered at Vrbica, with Milan and Loma and other commanders. The larger part of the army was sent to pursue Kučuk-Alija towards Kragujevac, while the rest was sent into the Belgrade nahija to rise up and gather more troops. Karađorđe messaged Vasa Čarapić to hold the road below the Avala mountain and the surroundings of Belgrade, while he went for the Smederevo area to join with Đuša Vulićević and then divided his troops to block Smederevo, and went with his personal guard (momci) to Batočina where Kučuk-Alija had sent Ganić with 250 Arnauts.

== Aftermath ==
According to captain Petar Jokić, Karađorđe uttered "the Turks beat us here and there, let them, this is the first time". Kučuk-Alija left Vrbica for Kragujevac, and on the way, stopped at Šljivovac where he captured three Serbs and cut them down. Arriving at Kragujevac, he demonstrated Karađorđe's fur coat at the town square, saying that he had killed Karađorđe, openly deceiving the people to deter them from rising up, and now "the villagers began to come with provisions". Next, kircali (bandits) and deli (light cavalry) were mustered at Jagodina, and Kučuk-Alija was not pursued by the rebels, as Karađorđe now was outside Belgrade. Next, there were skirmishes around Jagodina.

The knez Maksim, who had informed and escorted Kučuk-Alija, was handed over to Karađorđe in 1805 and executed at Vračar by Janko Katić.

== See also ==
- Timeline of the Serbian Revolution

== Annotations ==
1. K. Protić (1893) theorized that Kučuk-Alija perhaps wanted to join up with Alija Gušanac and his kircali, who also defied the sultan, at Jagodina, gain followers and negotiate with the Serbs to recognize him as the pasha and in return fight alongside the Serbs against the Dahije and Janissaries. The Serbs however, wanted no association with Turks. Gušanac knew that there was not much to loot from the poor Serb rayah as there were from the Belgrade Dahije.

== Sources ==
- Batalaka, Lazar Arsenijević (1898). Историја српског устанка. Vol. I. Izd. Batalakinoga fonda.
- Milojević, A. J. (1904). Za otadžbinu. D. Dimitrijević.
- Nenadović, Konstantin N. (1903) [1883]. Живот и дела великог Ђорђа Петровића Кара-Ђорђа. Vol. I (2 ed.). Belgrade: Штампа Савића и Комп. pp. 70–71 – via Archive.org.
- Nenadović, Konstantin N. (1884). Живот и дела великог Ђорђа Петровића Кара-Ђорђа. Vol. II (1 ed.). Vienna: У Штампарији Јована Н. Вернаја – via Google Books.
- Novaković, Stojan (1904). Устанак на дахије 1804. Штампано у Државној штампарији – via Archive.org.
- Protić, Kosta (1893). "Ратни догађаји из првога српског устанка под Карађорђем Петровићем 1804—1813". Годишњица Николе Чупића. XIII. Državna štamparija: 114–116.
