= Cernica (Varvarin) =

- Village
- Location within Serbia
- Coordinates: 43°43′54″N 21°15′43″E
- Country: Serbia
- District: Rasina District
- Municipality: Varvarin

Population (2002)
  - Total: 275
- Time zone: UTC+1 (CET)
  - Summer (DST): UTC+2 (CEST)

Cernica is a village in the municipality of Varvarin, Serbia. According to the 2002 census, the village has a population of 275 people.
