= Mala Kruševica =

- Village
- Location within Serbia
- Coordinates: 43°43′28″N 21°08′51″E
- Country: Serbia
- District: Rasina District
- Municipality: Varvarin

Population (2002)
  - Total: 317
- Time zone: UTC+1 (CET)
  - Summer (DST): UTC+2 (CEST)

Mala Kruševica is a village in the municipality of Varvarin, Serbia. According to the 2002 census, the village has a population of 317 people.
