= Toljevac =

Village in Rasina District, Serbia

Coordinates: 43.7336°N 21.2053°E

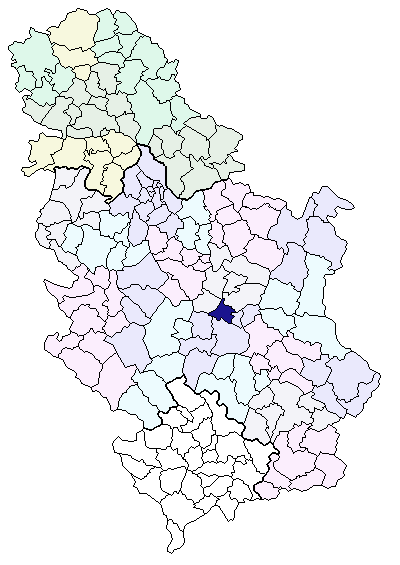
Location of the municipality of Varvarin in Serbia

Toljevac, in Serbian Cyrillic Тољевац, is a village in Serbia, situated in the municipality of Varvarin, and the district of Rasina. In 2002, it had 758 inhabitants.
