= Gornji Krčin =

- Village
- Location within Serbia
- Coordinates: 43°45′22″N 21°08′56″E
- Country: Serbia
- District: Rasina District
- Municipality: Varvarin

Population (2002)
  - Total: 243
- Time zone: UTC+1 (CET)
  - Summer (DST): UTC+2 (CEST)

Gornji Krčin is a village in the municipality of Varvarin, Serbia. According to the 2002 census, the village has a population of 243 people.
