= Etymology of Svarog =

Svarog (Old East Slavic languages: Сваро́гъ, romanized: Svarogǔ) is a Slavic god of fire and smithing mentioned in the Slavic translation of the Chronicle of John Malalas found in the Primary Chronicle as the Slavic equivalent of the Greek god Hephaestus.

The etymology of this god's name has been the subject of lively debate in scholarly circles. In the past, the predominant etymology was the Indo-Iranian one, according to which the name was borrowed from some language of that linguistic group. Today it is criticized by linguists and etymologists. Instead, native Slavic etymologies are proposed.

== Modern etymologies ==
=== From var "fire, heat" ===
The fire etymology was one of the first proposed by the Slovenian linguist Franc Miklošič (1875), who explained the theonym Svarog as consisting of the stem svar "heat", "light", and the suffix -og. He derived the root svar itself from the earlier *sur "shining". This etymology of the theonym, but with a revised etymology of the stem svar, was supported by Karel Oštir (1923), as well as by many contemporary linguists and religious scholars, e.g., Stanisław Urbańczyk (1991), Ariel Golan (1991), Mykola Zubov (2005), Martin Pukanec (2009), or Michał Łuczyński (2020).

The word var (Proto-Slavic *varъ, *var- "fire, heat", from Proto-Indo-European *wār- "warmth" ← *wérH-/*wṛH- "being hot" (Note: cf. e.g. Hittie 𒉿𒊏𒀀𒉌, wa-ra-a-ni "burned", Armenian վառիմ, vaṙim "to burn", Etruscan 𐌅𐌄𐌓𐌔𐌄, verse "burned".)) in Slavic languages has a meaning related to fire and high temperature, e.g. Old Church Slavonic варъ, varǔ "heat", or Old East Slavic варъ, varǔ "sunny heatwave, scorching heat, heat". Related to this word is the vocabulary of blacksmithing, e.g. OES сварити, svariti "to forge something at high temperature", or Old Polish zwarzyć "to weld, chain two pieces of iron", as well as the modern Russian words сварить, svarit' "to melt", "to weld", сваривать, svarivat' "to weld", сварщикъ, svarshchik'', "welder", or сваръ, svar'' "welding". The base of these words is *sъvarъ, which consists of the prefix *sъ- meaning "good, own" and the stem *varъ "fire, heat", which probably originally meant "good, own fire, heat" or something similar. Then *sъvarъ was expanded by an appropriate suffix, e.g. *sъvarъ + the verb suffix *-iti, which gave *sъvariti "to forge, to chain", from which OES svariti and OP zwarzyć come.

On this basis, the common noun *sъvarogъ is reconstructed, consisting of the base *sъvarъ, and the suffix *-ogъ. Since the suffix *-ogъ had no specific function, but was used to create a new word with a similar meaning, the noun had a meaning similar to the base (cf. tvarog "quark" = tvar "quark"). It later evolved into the theonym *Sъvarogъ (*S(ъ)varogъ – the hard sign notation was sometimes omitted), the personal name of a god, because of the blacksmithing powers of this god, a god who performs blacksmithing activities, works with fire.

The post-Christianization vocabulary also supports this etymology. In Romanian, there is a word sfarog meaning "something burnt, charred, dried". It is believed that this word was borrowed into Romanian most likely from an unspecified South Slavic language, possibly Bulgarian, and according to Zubov, the broadest and most obvious meaning of the Slavic word has found its way into Romanian. On the basis of this loan, he reconstructs the South-Slavic root word as *svarogъ, which meant "something that was touched by fire, was exposed to it". In addition, the Russian dialectic (Novgorodian) obsolete word сва́рог, svarog meaning "fire" and "blacksmith" is also preserved.

According to Pukanec, the theonym Svarog is postverbal to the verb *sъvar-iti with the suffix *-ogъ, i.e. *sъvar- would derive from the verb and not vice versa, just as *bat-ogъ from *bat-ati. Urbańczyk also pointed to a similar probability. According to Łuczyński, however, this is unlikely, since the exact Baltic equivalents of this suffix, Lithuanian -agas, Latvian -ags, combine only with nouns, and he believes that the same happens in Slavic languages: he derives *batogъ "whip, stick" from *batъ, *rarog "falcon" from *rarъ, *tvarogъ "quark, a kind of cheese" from *tvarъ, *pirogъ "pierog, a kind of dough" from *pirъ, etc.

=== From svar "quarrel" ===
In literature there is sometimes also an interpretation translating the stem svar as "quarrel, disagreement". As noun it exists in Old East Slavic. сваръ, svarǔ, Polish swar, Russian and Bulgarian свара svara, Ukrainian свар, svar, Czech and Slovak svár, Lower Sorbian swar, Upper Sorbian swaŕ, always in meaning of "quarrel, disagreement", and in Slovene as svȃr in meaning of "reprimand". There are also verbs associated with this word, such as the Polish swarzyć się "to quarrel"; Kazimierz Moszyński recorded a saying of a Polesian fisherman Boh svarycsa in reaction to thunder, also in Poland there was saying Bóg swarzy meaning "God is angry". Such etymology was supported, for example, by Aleksander Brückner, Vatroslav Jagić and others. Brückner explained this theonym literally as "wrangler, brawler", and that would also be associated with fire. Cognates in other languages include Old English andswaru (→ English swear), Old Norse sverja "to swear", or Sanskrit स्वरति, svarati "to sing", "to make sound", "to praise", all from PIE *swer-.

However, this etymology has been criticized on semantic grounds - the etymology from var "fire" is more in keeping with Svarog as the god of fire and blacksmithing.

== Other and dated etymologies ==
=== Indo-Iranian etymologies ===
Formerly, the prevailing view in the literature was that the root svar- was borrowed from some language of the Indo-Iranian group. Here one points out, for example, the Avestan 𐬵𐬬𐬀𐬭𐬆, hvar "light of the sky, sun", Old Indian स्वर्, svar "radiance", "sky", "sun", स्वर्ग, svarga "heaven". This view was supported by e.g. Vil'o Mansikka, Henryk Łowmiański and others. This view, however, has met with criticism. Aleksander Brückner pointed out the incompatibility of vowels in Indian svarga and Old East Slavic Svarogǔ, Mikołaj Rudnicki also pointed out that borrowing from Avestan hvar would give Slavic *xvor-, and borrowing from Old Indian svar- would give Slavic *svor-. Oleg Trubachyov also rejected the borrowing from Iranian because of the difficulty of explaining the consonant s-, but ultimately supported the view of borrowing from Old Indian svarga because, according to him, it was impossible to construct a Slavic etymology, so did Leo Klejn. In addition to phonetic difficulties, there is also a historical/geographical problem - the Slavic and Indo-Aryan languages were not in direct contact with each other, which would make borrowing even more difficult. Aleksandr Shaposhnykov tried to circumvent this problem and suggested a borrowing from Indo-Aryan *svarga- "walking in the sky", which was supposed to have entered the Slavic through the Maeotians' language in the Crimea or in the Pontus region (a similar possibility was assumed by Leo Borissoff), but the theory still contains the phonetic problems mentioned earlier. Leszek Bednarczuk assumed a borrowing from Proto-Iranian *svar "sun" from before the change of s → h, but the change of these sounds occurred already in Proto-Iranian, which makes the chronology of the borrowing difficult.

In addition to the etymologies listed above, a number of others have been proposed, but they all have phonetic problems. The main argument against borrowing from Indo-Iranian languages is that at an early stage the foreign *a always passed into the Proto-Slavic *o, e.g., Proto-Slavic *xorna "food", which is probably borrowed from Iranian, cf. Avestan 𐬓𐬀𐬭𐬆𐬥𐬀, xᵛarəna- "food". Kazimierz Moszyński tried to solve this problem by explaining that the original *o in the theonym turned into *a under the influence of common words like *svariti (sę), *svarъ, *svara. However, the influence of the words he mentioned on the theonym is unsupported.

=== Slavic etymologies ===
Other scholars have suggested that the stem svar is related to Old Indian svar "sun", not as loan but as cognate. Max Vasmer, however, pointed out that the ⟨r⟩ found in the Indo-Iranian forms is unoriginal and derived from the Proto-Indo-European *l, which was preserved intact in Slavic languages, and that the transformation of ⟨l⟩ into ⟨r⟩ itself occurred only in Indo-Iranian languages. Indian svar, Avestan hvar derives from PIE *s(e)h₂-ul- "sun", from which also derives the Slavic *sъlnьce, ancient Greek ἥλιος, hḗlios, Latin sōl, Lithuanian sáulė, etc.

Still others have suggested an affinity with Germanic words meaning "sky", e.g. Old High German gi-swerc "storm clouds", Old English sweorc "darkness, cloud, fog", or Dutch zwerk "cloud, cloudy sky".

== Bibliography ==
- Borissoff, Constantine Leo (2014). "Non-Iranian origin of the Eastern-Slavonic god Xŭrsŭ/Xors". Studia Mythologica Slavica. 17: 9–36. doi:10.3986/sms.v17i0.1491. ISSN 1581-128X.
- Brückner, Aleksander (1985). Mitologia słowiańska (in Polish). Warsaw: Państwowe Wydawnictwo Naukowe. ISBN 8301062452.
- Dal, Vladimir (1863). Толковый словарь живаго великорускаго языка В. И. Даля (in Russian). Vol. 1: А-З. Moscow: Общество любителей российской словесности.
- Derksen, Rick (2008). Etymological dictionary of the Slavic inherited lexicon. Leiden: Brill. ISBN 978-90-474-2816-9.
- Gieysztor, Aleksander (2006). Mitologia Słowian. Warszawa: Wydawnictwa Uniwersytetu Warszawskiego. ISBN 978-83-235-0234-0.
- Golan, Ariel (1991). Myth and Symbol: Symbolism in Prehistoric Religions. A. Golan. ISBN 9789652222459.
- Klejn, Leo S. (2004). Воскрешение Перуна. К реконструкции восточнославянского язычества (in Russian). Petersburg: Gorky Institute of World Literature. ISBN 5-8071-0153-7.
- Łowmiański, Henryk (1979). Religia Słowian i jej upadek, w. VI-XII (in Polish). Warszawa: Państwowe Wydawnictwo Naukowe. ISBN 83-01-00033-3.
- Łuczyński, Michał (2020). Bogowie dawnych Słowian. Studium onomastyczne (in Polish). Kielce: Kieleckie Towarzystwo Naukowe. ISBN 978-83-60777-83-1.
- Mansikka, Vil'o Y. (2005). Религия восточных славян (in Russian). Moscow: Gorky Institute of World Literature. ISBN 5-9208-0238-3.
- Miklošič, Franc (1875). Vergleichende Grammatik der slavischen Sprachen (in German). Vol. 2. Wiedeń.
- Niederle, Lubor (1924). Slovanské starožitnosti (in Czech). Vol. 1: Oddíl kulturní (2 ed.). Prague.
- Oštir, Karel (1923). "Illyro-Thrakisches". Arhiv Za Arbanasku Starinu, Jezik I Etnologiju. 1: 78–137.
- Pukanec, Martin (2009). "Etymológia mena Svarog a niektoré indické a iránske paralely" (PDF). Slavica Slovaca (in Slovak). 44 (1). Vydavateľstvo Matice slovenskej: 24–30. Archived from the original (PDF) on 2015-09-24.
- Shaposhnikov, Alexander K. (2012). "Северно-причерноморский ареал позднего праславянского языкового состояния (I–V вв.)". Северное Причерноморье: к истокам славянской культуры. Kyiv, Moscow: 230–237.
- Trubachyov, Oleg N. (1999). Indoarica в Северном Причерноморье (in Russian). Moskwa: Nauka. ISBN 5-02-011675-0.
- Urbańczyk, Stanisław (1991). Dawni Słowianie. Wiara i kult (in Polish). Wrocław: Ossolineum.
- Vasmer, Max (1986a). "свара". Этимологический словарь русского языка (in Russian). Vol. 3. Translated by Trubachyov, Oleg (2 ed.). Moscow: Progress. p. 569.
- Vasmer, Max (1986b). "Сварог". Этимологический словарь русского языка (in Russian). Vol. 3. Translated by Trubachyov, Oleg (2 ed.). Moscow: Progress. pp. 569–570.
- Zubov, Mykola Ivanovich (2005). Слов'янські повчання проти язичництва в лінгвотекстологічному висвітленні (in Ukrainian). Odesa: Общество любителей российской словесности.
