= Bednarczuk =

Bednarczuk is a Polish surname. Notable people with the surname include:

- Ágatha Bednarczuk (born 1983), Brazilian international beach volleyball player of Polish-Italian descent
- Leszek Bednarczuk (1936–2025), Polish linguist, Indo-Europeanist, and professor
