= Temnić =

Geographical subregion of Šumadija, Serbia

Temnić (Serbian: Темнић) is a geographical and historical subregion of Šumadija in central Serbia. The most notable settlement is Varvarin.

== Geography ==
Temnić is located between the Great Morava to the east, Juhor Mountain to the north and West Morava to the south.

== See also ==
- List of regions of Serbia
- Temnić inscription
