= Medieval Serbian inscriptions =

List of Medieval Serbian inscriptions.

- Temnić inscription, 11th century
- Grd of Trebinje Tablet, 12th century
- Blagaj inscription, 12th century
- Stefan Radoslav of Serbia's ring, 1218–20
- inscription of the Church of the Virgin Hodegetria, Mušutište, 1315
- Stefan Dušan's plate, between 1331 and 1355
- Baldovin's tombstone, after 1345
- Đuraš Ilijić's tombstone, 1362
- Jefimija's epitaph, Praise to Prince Lazar, beginning of 15th century
- Stefan Lazarević's ktitor inscription in Manasija
- Despot Stefan Lazarević Memorial
- Dimitrije Vojinović's tombstone

== See also ==
- Medieval Serbian literature
- Stećak
- Medieval Serbia

== Bibliography ==
- Stojanović, Ljubomir (1905). Стари српски записи и натписи. Vol. 3. Српска краљевска академија.
- МИЛАН ИВАНОВИЋ. "Прилози ο споменицима Метохије, Новобрдске Криве Реке, Сиринићке и Никшићке жупе" (PDF). Heritage of Serbia.
