= Pietro Stancovich =

Priest, historian and inventor

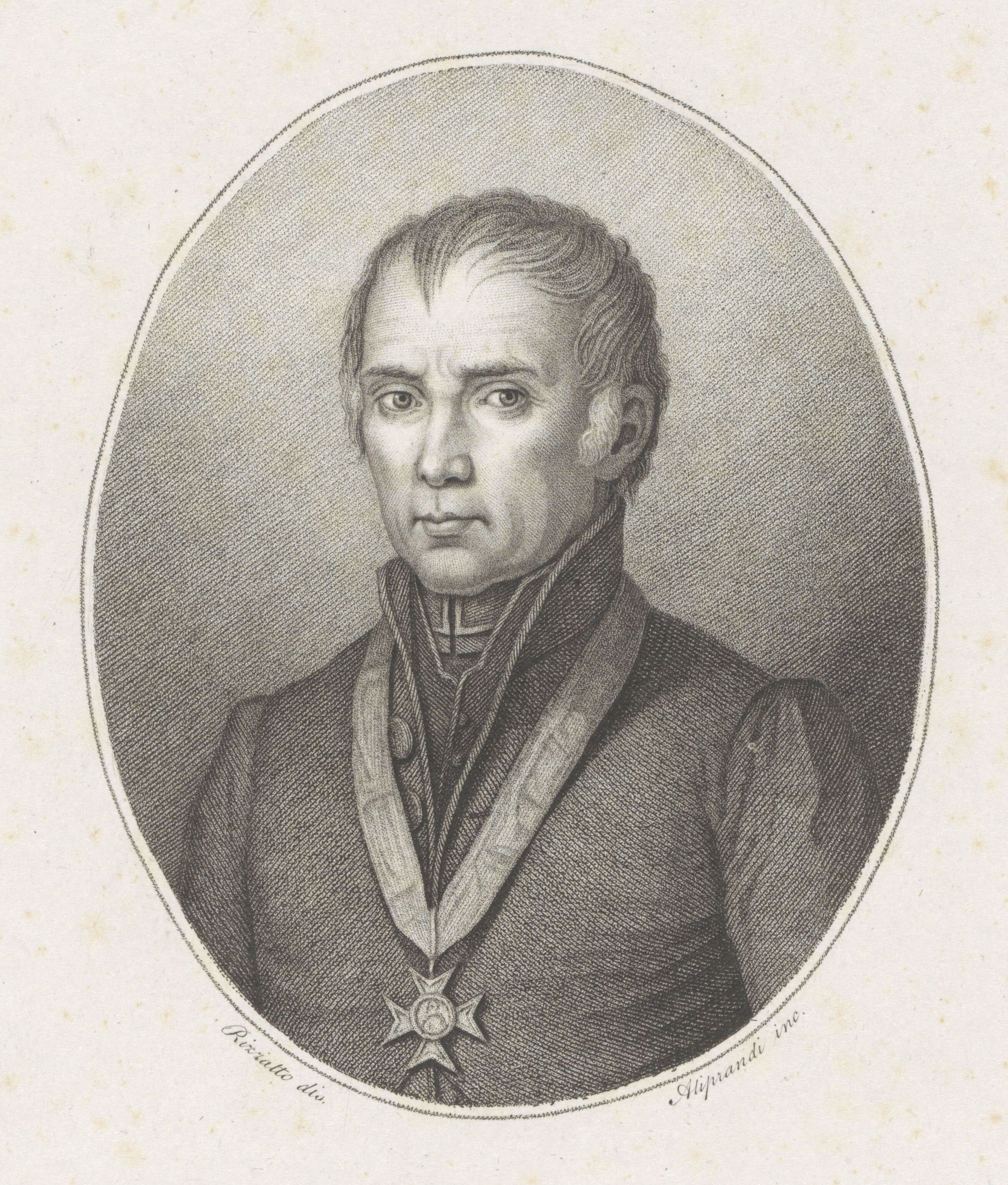
- Pietro Mattia Stancovich
- Born: 24 February 1771; Barban, Stato da Màr, Republic of Venice
- Died: 12 September 1852 (aged 81); Barban, Austrian Littoral, Austrian Empire
- Other name: Petar Stanković
- Education: University of Padua, 1795
- Occupations: Priest, historian, inventor

Pietro Mattia Stancovich or Petar Matija Stanković (Barban, 24 February 1771 – Barban, 12 September 1852) was a priest, historian and inventor, born in Istria.

== Biography ==
He studied theology in Padua, was ordained in Pula and then appointed a canon in Barban. He self-published a total of twenty books, including a biography of prominent Istrians. Stancovic was also an inventor, constructing a sowing plow and two devices intended for the processing of olives (the spolpoliva and torchioliva). He wrote a treatise about his inventions, published in 1840. In Rovinj there is a library containing thousands of his books, called the Stancoviciana.

== Bibliography ==
- Versi ed una Novella in prosa intitolata: Neofaste in Astiri. Venice, 1818.
- L’aratro seminatore, ossia Metodo di piantare il grano arando, con una tavola in rame. Venice, 1820.
- Dello anfiteatro di Pola dei gradi marmorei del medesimo nuovi scavi e scoperte e di alcune epigrafi e figurine inedite dell'Istria. Venice, 1822.
- Della patria di San Girolamo dottore di Santa Chiesa e della lingua slava relativa allo stesso''. Venice, 1824.
- Nuovo metodo economico-pratico di fare e conservare il vino del canonico. Milan, 1825.
- Canzone che si canta nelle pubbliche rogazioni per implorare la fertilità della terra. Venice, 1825.
- Allocuzione nell’occasione di visita Pastorale Balbi. Venice, 1826.
- Kratak nauk karstianski. Trieste, 1828.
- San Girolamo Il Dottore Massimo Dimostrato Evidentemente Di Patria Istriano Apologia Del Canonico Pietro Stanchovich Contro La Risposta Di D. Giovanni Capor. Trieste, 1829.
- Biografia degli uomini distinti dell'Istria. Koper, 1828 (volume 1), 1829 (volumes 2-3).
- Trieste non fu villaggio Carnico, ma luogo dell’Istria: Fortezza e Colonia de’ Cittadini Romani. Trieste, 1830.
- "Marmo di Lucio Menacio Prisco patrono di Pola" in L’Archeografo Triestino: raccolta di opuscoli e notizie per Trieste e per l’Istria (Volume 2) pp. 407-419. Trieste, 1830.
- "Depositi di Monete Ungheresi, Carraresi e Veneziane, scoperto in Istria con Tavola litografica" in L’Archeografo Triestino: raccolta di opuscoli e notizie per Trieste e per l’Istria (Volume 3) pp. 385-398. Trieste, 1831.
- L’Androgino. Venice, 1832.
- Dialoghi critici serio-faceti di Veranzio Islina Dalmatino con Andrea Moretto detto Memoria. Venice, 1833.
- Delle Tre Emone antiche Città e Colonie Romane, e della genuina Epigrafe di Cajo Precellio patrono della splendidissima Colonia degli Aquillejesi, dei Parentini, degli Opitergini, e degli Emonesi. Venice, 1835.
- Degli Altari e della loro Consacrazione, Esecrazione e, violazione: e se le Relliquie siano necessarie nella Consacrazione degli Altari. Venice, 1837.
- Torchioliva, ossia torchio oleario. Florence, 1841.
- Il formento seminato senza aratura, zappatura, vangatura, cripicatura e senza letame animale. Padua, 1842.
- Degli acquedotti di Roma antica e moderna, delle provincie e delle colonie dell Istria, dell arco acquedotto Romano di Trieste e progetti per Fornire di acquadetta citta cenni del canonico Pietro Stancovich. Venice, 1844.
- Dell' antico Romano arco-aquedotto detto Arco Riccardo, o prigione di Riccardo esistente in Trieste; aggiunta all opuscolo: Cenni degli acquedotti antichi di Roma e dell' Istria e particolarmente dell' arco acquedotto di Trieste. Trieste, 1846.
- Vino dell' Istria principale prodotto di questa provincia. Nuovo metodo economico-pratico per farlo e conservarlo opera del canonico Pietro Stancovich. Milan, 1853.

== Bibliography ==
- Ivetic, Egidio (2019). "STANCOVICH, Pietro". Dizionario Biografico degli Italiani (in Italian). Vol. 94: Stampa–Tarantelli. Rome: Istituto dell'Enciclopedia Italiana. ISBN 978-88-12-00032-6.
- Milčetić, Ivan (1912). "Petar Stanković iz Istre, hrvatski pisac" [Petar Stanković of Istria, Croatian Author]. Građa za povijest književnosti hrvatske (in Serbo-Croatian). 7: 364–366.
