= Donje Štiplje =

- Village
- Location within Serbia
- Coordinates: 44.0125°N 21.17278°E
- Country: Serbia
- District: Pomoravlje District
- Municipality: Jagodina

Population (2002)
  - Total: 272
- Time zone: UTC+1 (CET)
  - Summer (DST): UTC+2 (CEST)

Donje Štiplje is a village in the municipality of Jagodina, Serbia. According to the 2002 census, the village has a population of 272 people.
