= Qatavand =

Qatavand قطوند
- Village
- Location within Iran
- Coordinates: 35°32′45″N 46°32′32″E
- Country: Iran
- Province: Kurdistan
- County: Marivan
- Bakhsh: Sarshiv
- Rural District: Gol-e Cheydar

Population (2006)
  - Total: 124
- Time zone: UTC+3:30 (IRST)
  - Summer (DST): UTC+4:30 (IRDT)

Qatavand (Persian: قطوند, also Romanized as Qaţāvand and Qaţvand; also known as Kattūn, Katūn, Qaţāvan, Qatāvon, and Qateh Vand) is a village in Gol-e Cheydar Rural District, Sarshiv District, Marivan County, Kurdistan Province, Iran. At the 2006 census, its population was 124, in 24 families. The village is populated by Kurds.
