= Gornji Katun =

- Village
- Location within Serbia
- Coordinates: 43°44′36″N 21°21′27″E
- Country: Serbia
- District: Rasina District
- Municipality: Varvarin

Population (2002)
  - Total: 1,468
- Time zone: UTC+1 (CET)
  - Summer (DST): UTC+2 (CEST)

Gornji Katun is a village in the municipality of Varvarin, Serbia. According to the 2002 census, the village has a population of 1468 people.

The Old Slavic Temnić inscription was found in the village.
