= Katun, Pljevlja =

Katun Катун
- Village
- Location within Montenegro
- Country: Montenegro
- Region: Northern
- Municipality: Pljevlja

Population (2011)
  - Total: 165
- Time zone: UTC+1 (CET)
  - Summer (DST): UTC+2 (CEST)

Katun (Montenegrin Cyrillic: Катун) is a village in the municipality of Pljevlja, Montenegro.

== Demographics ==
According to the 2003 census, the village had a population of 249 people.

According to the 2011 census, its population was 165.

According to the 2023 census, the population was 150.

Ethnicity in 2011
Ethnicity	Number	Percentage
Serbs	63	38.2%
Bosniaks	42	25.5%
Montenegrins	35	21.2%
other/undeclared	25	15.2%
Total	165	100%
