= Katun (Vranje) =

Katun Катун (Serbian)
- Village (Selo)
- Location within Serbia
- Country: Serbia
- Region: Southern and Eastern Serbia
- District: Pčinja
- Municipality: Vranje

Population (2002)
  - Total: 432
- Time zone: UTC+1 (CET)
  - Summer (DST): UTC+2 (CEST)

Katun is a village in the municipality of Vranje, Serbia. According to the 2002 census, the village has a population of 432 people.

== History ==
The settlement was possibly mentioned during the first half of the 15th century.
