= Leszek Bednarczuk =

Polish linguist and academic (1936–2025)

- Born: May 30, 1936; Vilnius
- Died: November 2, 2025 (aged 89); Kraków
- Citizenship: Poland

Leszek Bednarczuk (30 May 1936 – 2 November 2025) was a Polish linguist, Indo-Europeanist, professor of the Pedagogical University of Cracow from 1987 and member of the Polish Academy of Sciences. Bednarczuk authored a 2010 book Językowy obraz Wielkiego Księstwa Litewskiego (English: Languages of the Grand Duchy of Lithuania; Lithuanian: Lietuvos Didžiosios Kunigaikštystės kalbos). Bednarczuk was born in Vilnius on 30 May 1936, and died on 2 November 2025, at the age of 89.
