= Varvarin =

Varvarin Варварин (Serbian)
- Town and municipality
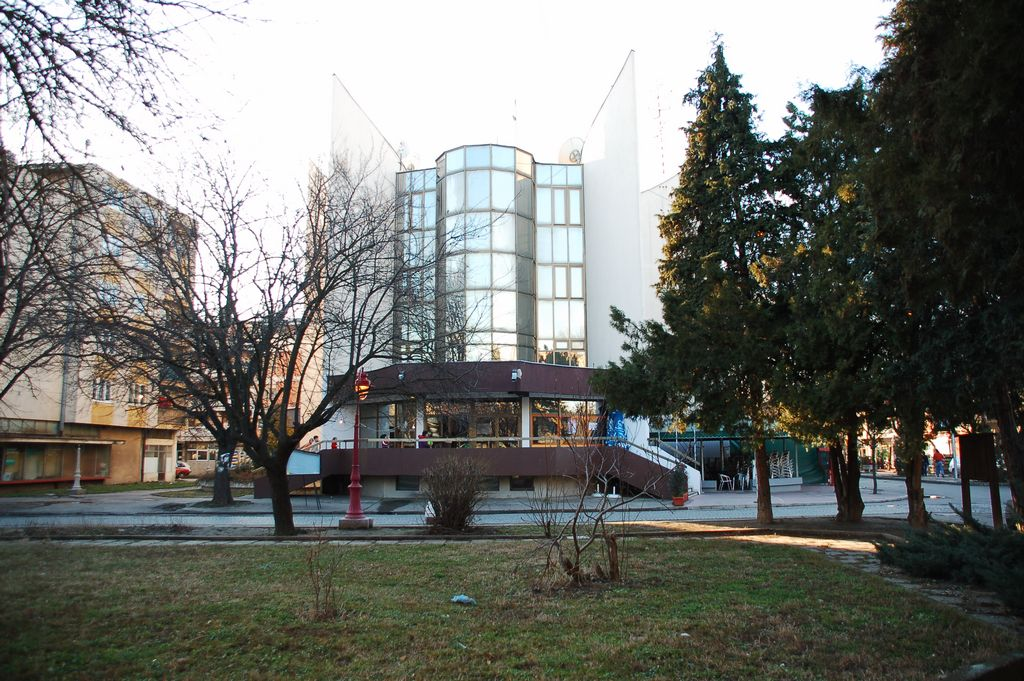
- House of Culture in Varvarin

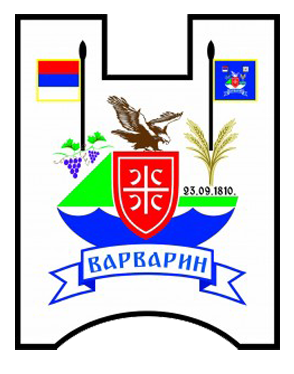
- Coat of arms

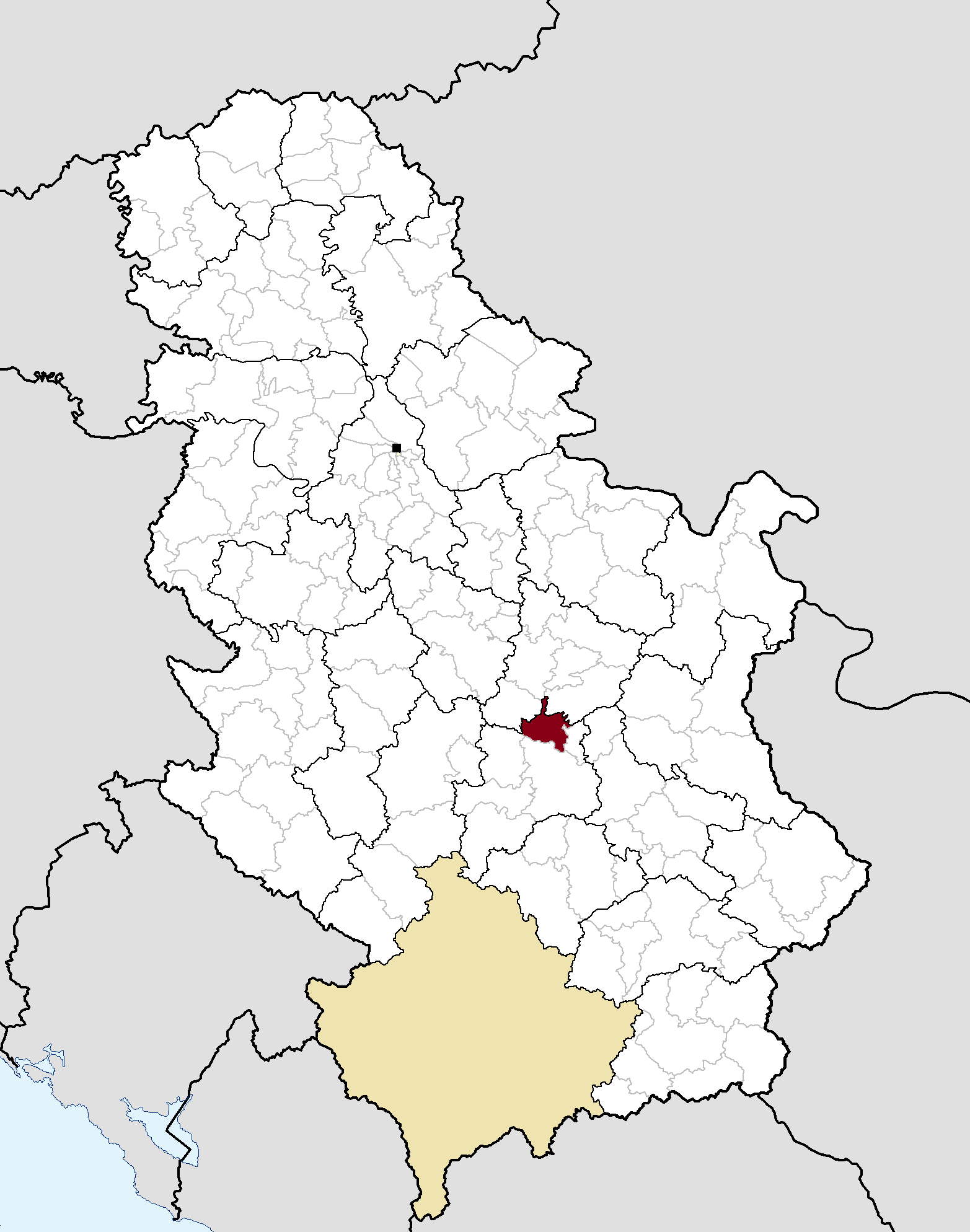
- Location of the municipality of Varvarin within Serbia
- Coordinates: 43°43′N 21°22′E
- Country: Serbia
- Region: Šumadija and Western Serbia
- District: Rasina
- Settlements: 21

Government
  - Mayor: Violeta Lutovac Đurđević (SNS)

Area
  - Municipality: 249 km^{2} (96 sq mi)
- Elevation: 145 m (476 ft)

Population (2022 census)
  - Town: 1,805
  - Municipality: 14,217
- Time zone: UTC+1 (CET)
  - Summer (DST): UTC+2 (CEST)
- Postal code: 37260
- Area code: +381(0)37
- Car plates: KŠ
- Website: www.varvarin.org.rs

Varvarin (Serbian Cyrillic: Варварин, pronounced [ʋarʋǎriːn]) is a town and municipality located in the Rasina District of central Serbia. Population of the town is 1,805, and population of the municipality is 14,217 (2022 census).

== History ==
The town is notable as the site of an 1810 battle during the Russo-Turkish War (1806-1812) between the Ottoman Empire and a combined Russian and Serbian army. A statue to the Russian commander Joseph Cornelius O'Rourke and his men was erected in 1910 on the centenary of their victory in the battle, which freed the city from Turkish domination.

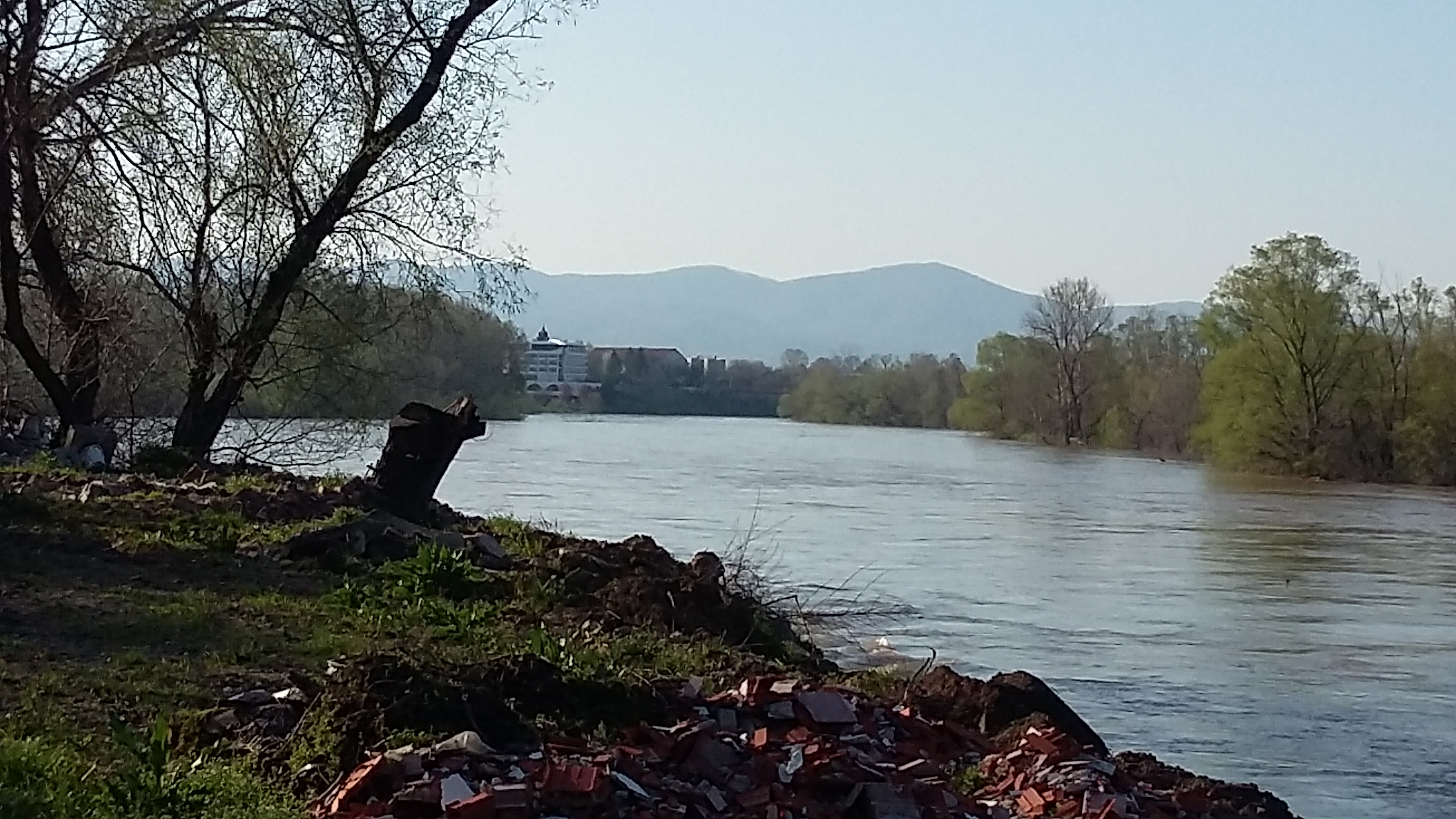
View of Varvarin from the river Morava

From 1929 to 1941, Varvarin was part of the Morava Banovina of the Kingdom of Yugoslavia.

=== NATO bombing ===
During the Kosovo war and the break-up of Yugoslavia in the late 20th century, the area became engulfed in conflict although distant from the border. On a clear Sunday, 30 May 1999, shortly after 1 p.m., a bridge crossing the Velika Morava river in Varvarin was struck by laser-guided bombs fired by one or two low-flying NATO F-16 warplanes conducting attack operations. The area around the bridge was filled with hundreds of people celebrating an Orthodox holiday in and around the nearby church, a market place, and a fairground.

No precautions against air attacks had been taken, as the town is far from Kosovo (approximately 200 km), the aged and narrow bridge was considered insignificant, and no military installations were within a radius of 20 km. Ten civilians were killed and 17 severely injured, in two attack waves a few minutes apart. Most of the casualties occurred in the second wave, when people had rushed to the bridge to help those wounded in the initial wave. Some survivors were left with permanent disabilities,

To this date, NATO has refused to release further details of the airstrike – specifically the nationality of the attacking planes. In a public statement made by NATO spokesman Jamie Shea on 31 May 1999, he declared the Varvarin bridge a legitimate military target. No explanations or other statements have been issued by NATO since then.

The airstrike gave rise to a lawsuit against the German government (one of the NATO countries involved in the conflict). The case was decided against the Serbian plaintiffs, but it is under appeal to Germany's highest court.

== Demographics ==
Historical population
Year	Pop.	±% p.a.
1948	26,088	—
1953	26,744	+0.50%
1961	26,423	−0.15%
1971	26,143	−0.11%
1981	25,779	−0.14%
1991	23,821	−0.79%
2002	20,122	−1.52%
2011	17,966	−1.25%
2022	14,217	−2.11%

According to the 2011 census results, the municipality of Varvarin had a population of 17,966 inhabitants.

=== Ethnic groups ===
The ethnic composition of the municipality:

Ethnic group	Population	%
Serbs	17,507	97.45%
Romani	113	0.63%
Montenegrins	30	0.17%
Macedonians	20	0.11%
Croats	13	0.07%
Vlachs	12	0.07%
Bulgarians	8	0.04%
Yugoslavs	7	0.04%
Romanians	6	0.03%
Others	250	1.39%
Total	17,966	

== Economy ==
The following table gives a preview of total number of employed people per their core activity (as of 2017):

Activity	Total
Agriculture, forestry and fishing	22
Mining	15
Processing industry	448
Distribution of power, gas and water	12
Distribution of water and water waste management	48
Construction	64
Wholesale and retail, repair	376
Traffic, storage and communication	69
Hotels and restaurants	99
Media and telecommunications	37
Finance and insurance	19
Property stock and charter	2
Professional, scientific, innovative and technical activities	86
Administrative and other services	31
Administration and social assurance	161
Education	250
Healthcare and social work	126
Art, leisure and recreation	39
Other services	64
Total	1,970

== Twin cities ==
- Ravne na Koroškem, Slovenia

== See also ==
- List of places in Serbia (N-Z)
