= Martin E. Huld =

American linguist

Academic background
- Education: California State University, Los Angeles; University of California, Los Angeles
- Influences: Georges Dumézil

Academic work
- Discipline: Linguistics
- Sub-discipline: Indo-European linguistics

Martin E. Huld is an American linguist who is Professor Emeritus at California State University, Los Angeles. He specializes in Indo-European linguistics.

== Biography ==
Huld received his B.A. (1972) at California State University, Los Angeles, and his M.A. (1978) and Ph.D. (1979) at the University of California, Los Angeles. He subsequently served Lecturer at California State University, Los Angeles (1983-1998), Instructor at Mount Saint Mary's College (1991-1998), Assistant Professor in the Department of English at California State University, Los Angeles (1998-2004), Associate Professor in the Department of English at California State University, Los Angeles (2004-2007), and Professor in the Department of English at California State University, Los Angeles (2007-2015). Huld retired as Professor Emeritus in 2015. Huld specializes in Indo-European linguistics. He is the author of numerous influential works on this subject. He is a contributor to the Encyclopedia of Indo-European Culture and the American Heritage Dictionary, a board member of the Journal of Indo-European Studies, President of the Friends and Alumni of Indo-European Studies at the University of California, Los Angeles, and member of the Linguistic Society of America, the Early English Text Society, and the Linguistic Association of the Southwest.

== Selected works ==
- Basic Albanian Etymologies. Columbus, OH: Slavica Publishers, 1984
- On the Unacceptability of the Indo-European Voiced Stops as Ejectives, 1986
- The Vocabulary of Indo-European Culture in The Kurgan Culture and the Indo-Europeanization of Europe, 1997
- Etymological Dictionaries: Theory of Greek Etymology in Encyclopedia of Ancient Greek Language and Linguistics, 2013

== See also ==
- Edgar C. Polomé
- Jaan Puhvel
