= Timeline of Hungarian history =

The timeline of Hungarian history lists the important historical events that took place in the territory of the Carpathian Basin, in the territory of the historical Hungarian lands, i.e belonging to the former Kingdom of Hungary, history of Hungarians and events closely connected to the history of Hungary.

== Before 9th century BC ==
Date	Event
Before 30,000 BC	Anatomically modern humans arrived at the Carpathian Basin and belonged to the Aurignacian group.
5400–4500 BC	Tisza culture
4500–4000 BC	Tiszapolgár culture
4000–3600 BC	Bodrogkeresztúr culture
3600–2690 BC	Baden culture
3500–2500 BC	Coțofeni culture
3000–2200 BC	Vučedol culture
2200–1500 BC	Wietenberg culture

== 9th century BC ==
Date	Event
	Smaller groups of pre-Scythians (Cimmerians) of the Mezőcsát culture appeared.

== 7th century BC ==
Date	Event
700–500 BC	The classic Scythian culture spread across the Great Hungarian Plain between the 7th–6th century BC.

== 5th century BC ==
Date	Event
	The Syginnae live in the Great Hungarian Plain. Archaeological finds show their commercial contacts with the Adriatic Veneti and Greeks.

== 4th century BC ==
Date	Event
	Celts invade Pannonia and gradually conquer the lands along the Middle Danube.

== 3rd century BC ==
Date	Event
	The Celticisation of Transdanubia is completed and the native languages disappear.
279 BC	Celts invade the Balkan Peninsula from the Middle Danube region, reaching as far as Greece.

== 2nd century BC ==
Date	Event
113 BC	The Celtic Boii control the Middle Danube region when the Cimbri move across their territory during their migration towards the Alps.

== 1st century BC ==
Date	Event
50 BC	The Sarmatians arrived in multiple waves.
c. 50 BC	The Osi, Cotini and Anarti live in the northern regions of the Great Hungarian Plain. The Dacians take control of the lands to the east of the river Tisza.
c. 45 BC	The Dacian king, Burebista, defeats the Celtic ruler, Critasirus, and occupies lands east and north of the Middle Danube.
c. 44 BC	Burebista dies and his kingdom disintegrates.
35 BC	The Romans force the Pannonian tribes living along the Sava into submission.
	Roman denarii start circulating in Transdanubia.
13 BC	The Roman generals Marcus Vipsanius Agrippa and Tiberius crush the Pannonian tribes' revolt between the Sava and the Dráva. The young Pannonians are captured and sold as slaves.
c. 12 BC	The Germanic tribe of Marcomanni force the Boii to abandon the lands north of the Middle Danube.
11 BC	The Romans include Pannonia in the Roman province of Illyricum, declaring the Danube as its northern border.
10 BC	The Roman general Marcus Vinicius launches an expedition across the Danube, forcing the Celtic tribes of the Great Hungarian Plain to make an alliance with the Roman Empire.

== 1st century ==
Date	Event
6	Tiberius wages war against the Marcomanni. After the governor of Illyricum, Marcus Valerius Messalla Messallinus, orders the enlistment of the Pannonians in the Roman army, the Illyrian tribes rose up. Tiberius abandons his military campaign along the Elbe to fight against the rebels.
6–9	The Romans force the Illyrian tribes one by one into submission.
8/9	Illyricum is divided into two along the Sava. The new Roman province incorporating the lands between the Sava and the Middle Danube is known as Pannonia.
10s	The Sarmatian tribe of the Iazyges settle in the plains between the Danube and the Tisza and force the Dacians to withdraw to Transylvania. Emperor Tiberius settles veterans and civilians at Scarbantia (now Sopron) and Salla (now Zalalövő) on the Amber Road.
c. 18 – c. 50	Allied with Rome, Vannius, king of the Germanic Quadi, forces the tribes of the Great Hungarian Plain to pay tribute to him.
40s–50s	Emperor Claudius establishes the colonia (or town) of Savaria (now Szombathely) on the Amber Road, settling veterans of the Legio XV Apollinaris in the town. Colonists from Aquilea and other north Italian towns move to Savaria and natives also live in the town. Pliny the Elder lists the Boii, Azali, Eravisci, Cotini, Arabiates and Hercuniates among the native tribes living in Transdanubia in his Natural History. The native tribes are organized in civitates peregrinae (semi-autonomous districts supervised by a Roman military officer).
c. 50	Emperor Claudius forbids the governor of Pannonia, Sextus Palpellius Hister, to assist Vannius against his rebellious nephews, Sido and Italicus. Vannius is forced to abdicate and flee to Pannonia. His nephews divide his realm among themselves. Natives are first recruited as auxiliaries in the Pannonian regions north of the Dráva. Auxiliary forts are established at Arrabona, Brigetio and Aquincum (now Győr, Szőny and Budapest in Hungary).
68–69	The governor of Pannonia, Lucius Tampius Flavianus, intervenes in the struggle for the imperial throne in Rome. He dispatches Roman legionaries and the troops of Sido and Italicus to Rome to fight against Emperor Vitellius.
c. 73	The governor of Pannonia, Gaius Calpetanus Rantius, orders the strengthening of the auxiliary fort at Aquincum.
88	The Marcomanni and the Quadi refuse to support the Romans during Domitian's Dacian War. Emperor Domitian invade their territory, but he abandons the military campaign without defeating the Germanic peoples.
89	The Germanic tribes wage war against the Iazyges with Roman support.
92/93	The Iazyges invade Pannonia and route a Roman legion. Domitian comes to Pannonia and defeats the Iazyges.
98	Emperor Trajan appoints new kings to rule the Marcomanni and Quadi.
c. 100	A new fortress is built at Brigetio and the Legio XI Claudia is transferred to there. The Legio X Gemina is stationed at Aquincum. Gorsium (now Tác) is made the center for the imperial cult in Pannonia.

== 2nd century ==
Date	Event
c. 104	Pannonia is divided into two provinces, Pannonia Superior and Pannonia Inferior.
106	The newly established Legio XXX Ulpia Victrix replaces the Legio XI Claudia in Brigetio after the fall of Decebal's Dacian kingdom. The Iazyges take possession of the lowlands to the east of the Tisza. Roman watch towers are erected across the Middle Danube.
117	The Legio I Adiutrix replaces XXX Ulpia at Brigetio and Legio II Adiutrix takes over Aquincum from X Gemina.
117–119	The Iazyges make raids against Pannonia Inferior. Emperor Hadrian charges Marcius Turbo with the united command of Pannonia Inferior and Dacia to secure the coordination of military actions against the Iazyges and their allies, the Roxolani.
124	Hadrian make Aquincum a municipium.
c. 135 – c. 140	The Marcomanni and Quadi make raids against both Pannonian provinces.
c.140	Hadrian's designated heir, Lucius Aelius, is made the governor of both Pannonian provinces.
161	Emperor Marcus Aurelius transfers the Legio II Adiutrix to the empire's eastern border at the beginning of the Roman–Parthian War, replacing it with Legio IV Flavia Felix in Aquincum.
160s	Vexillationes (or detachments) of the Danubian legions are sent to fight against the Parthian Empire. Marcus Aurelius plans to annex the territory of the Marcomanni and Iazyges and establishes two new legions, Legio II Italica and Legio III Italica.
c. 166	Start of the Marcomannic Wars. The Germanic Lombards and Ubii attack Pannonia near Brigetio, but the Roman troops defeat them. Ballomar, the king of the Marcomanni, and envoys from 10 other tribes dwelling along the Roman border enter into negotiations with the governor of Pannonia Superior, Marcus Jallius Bassus.
167–171	Marcus Aurelius and his co-emperor, Lucius Verus, are planning to launch a military expedition across the Danube, but Lucius dies unexpectedly and a plague forces Marcus Aurelius to return to Italy.
167–168	Marcus Aurelius and his co-emperor, Lucius Verus, are planning to launch a military expedition across the Danube, but Lucius dies unexpectedly and a plague forces Marcus Aurelius to return to Italy.
171	The Quadi's request for free access to the Roman markets is denied.
171–175	Marcus Aurelius writes parts of his Meditations while staying in Pannonia during his campaigns against the neighboring Germanic tribes.
172	Marcus Aurelius defeats the Quadi, forcing them to make a peace and release their Roman prisoners. He appoints Furtius to be their new king. Groups of Quadi are allowed to settle in the Danubian provinces.
173	Marcus Aurelius forces the Marcomanni to make peace and abandon the lands along the northern banks of the Danube. The Quadi dethrone Furtius and elect Ariogaesus their new ruler.
173, Winter	Iazyges invade Pannonia across the Danube. Ariogaesus makes alliance with the Iazyges, but the Romans capture him.
174, Early	The Romans route the Iazyges. The Iazyges capture their king, Banadaspus, and elect Zanticus his successor.
c. 174	The remnants of the Cotini and the Germanic Naristae are settled in Pannonia.
175	The Iazyges agrees to release their Roman prisoners and to abandon the lands along the eastern banks of the Danube.
177–178	Germanic tribes and Iazyges make raids against Pannonia.
178, Summer	Marcus Aurelius and his co-emperor, Commodus, come to Pannonia to command the local troops in person.
178, Late	Late. 40,000 Roman troops occupy the land of the Marcomanni and Quadi and winter there.
180, Spring	Marcus Aurelius prevents the Quadi from migrating to the north.
180, Autumn	Marcus Aurelius' successor, Commodus, makes peace with the Marcomanni and Quadi. He appoints Roman centurions to control the two tribes' activities before marching to Rome.
c. 185	Watchtowers are erected along the Middle Danube.
193, April, 9	After Commodus' death, the governor of Pannonia Superior, Septimius Severus is proclaimed emperor by the Pannonian legions.
193, June	After seizing Rome, Septimius Severus musters primarily Pannonian troops to the Praetorian Guard.
194	Septimius Severus grants the rank of colonia to Aquincum.
196	Septimius Severus sends his son and heir, Caracalla, to Pannonia before his campaign against Clodius Albinus.

== 3rd century ==
Date	Event
202	Septimius Severus personally inaugurates a new temple in Gorsium.
212	Caracalla grants Roman citizenship to all natives, but the conquered peoples (or dediticii) in the Roman Empire.
212/213	The Quadi invade Pannonia, but Emperor Caracalla had their king, Gaiobomarus, executed.
214	Caracalla makes the river Rába the new boundary between the two Pannonian provinces.
c. 230	Iazyges invade Pannonia.
248	Emperor Philip the Arab appoints Pacatianus the commander of the troops both in Pannonia Inferior and in Moesia Superior. The Illyriciani—the troops of the Danubian provinces—proclaim Pacatianus emperor, but they murder him when the Emperor appoints one of their number, Decius, their commander.
249, Summer	The Illyriciani proclaim Decius emperor.
250s	Quadi make raids against Pannonia.
258–260	The westward expansion of the Goths forces the Germanic Gepids and the Sarmatian Roxolani to move to the Carpathian Basin. Sarmatian and Germanic tribes make a series of raids against Pannonia. Emperor Gallienus settles groups of Marcomanni in Pannonia.
260s	Clashes between the Roxolani, Gepids, Iazyges and Vandals along the borders of Pannonia and Dacia.
270s, Early	Emperor Aurelian orders the evacuation of the province of Dacia.
c. 278	Iazyges invade Pannonia.
282	Emperor Carus defeats the Sarmatians and the Quadi.
285	The Sarmatians invade Pannonia, but Emperor Diocletian defeats them.
290	The Goths and the Taifali wage war against the Vandals and Gepids.
293	A Roman fort is built on the left bank of the Danube opposite Aquincum.
293	Diocletian defeats the Sarmatians.
294	A canal is built between the Lake Balaton and the Danube.
295	Carpians are settled around Sopianae.
290s, Late	Both Pannonian provinces are divided into two, with their parts north of the Dráva forming Pannonia Prima and Pannonia Valeria provinces.

== 4th century ==
Date	Event
303, February, 24	Diocletian forbids Christian worships in the Roman Empire.
303, June, 8	Bishop Quirinus of Sescia (now Sisak in Croatia) is executed in Savaria.
305	Galerius and Constantine invade Sarmatian territory.
308, November	Pannonia is assigned to Emperor Licinius.
314, October, 8	Battle of Cibalae: Constantine defeats Licinius, forcing him to abandon Pannonia.
320s–330s	New fortifications are built on plateaus along the Middle Danube.
322, May–June	A Sarmatian chieftain, Rausimodus, besieges Campona (in present-day Budapest), but Constantine forces him to abandon the siege.
332	The Goths invade Sarmatian territory, forcing the Argaragantes (the ruling Sarmatians) to arm their unfree subjects, the Limigantes. The Romans intervene in the war on the Sarmatians' behalf and defeat the Goths. The Limigantes rose up and defeat the Argaragantes who flee to Vandal and Roman territory.
332–334	After a series of clashes with the Romans, the Sarmatians accept Roman protectorate.
330s–350s	The Vandals, Gepids and Goths take possession of the northern regions of the Great Hungarian Plain.
356	The Quadi invade Pannonia Valeria and the Sarmatians attack Pannonia Secunda.
357, Summer	Emperor Constantius II comes to Sirmium to conduct negotiations with the Quadi and the Sarmatians.
357, Winter	The Quadi and the Sarmatians make a raid against the Pannonian provinces.
358, April	Constantius II invade the Limigantes' territory and Roman troops from Pannonia Valeria attack the Quadi, forcing their leaders to pay homage to the Emperor.
358, Winter	The Limigantes make raids against their neighbors.
359, April	Constantius II meets with the envoys of the Limigantes near Aquincum. The envoys try to capture him, but his retainers massacre them. The Romans invade Sarmatian territory, destroying their settlements.
365	The Quadi and the Sarmatians invade Roman territories.
c. 367	Emperor Valentinian I's magister militum, Aequitius, had new fortresses built along the Middle Danube.
374, Early	The Quadi protest against the erection of a Roman fortress on their territory, but Dux Maximianus kills their king Gabinius.
374, July	The Quadi invade Pannonia Valeria and slaughter or capture the local peasants.
375, August–November	Valentinian I invade Quadi territories.
375, November, 17	Valentinian I dies in Brigetio during the peace negotiations with the Quadi envoys.
c. 375	Roman coins cease to circulate in Pannonia to the north of the Dráva.
378, Late Summer–Autumn	Goths, Alans and Huns invade the Balkan provinces and Pannonia after their victory over the Romans in the Battle of Adrianople.
379	The Pannonian provinces suffered from the Migration Period from 379 onwards, the settlement of the Goth-Alan-Hun ally caused repeated serious crises and devastations, the contemporaries described it as a state of siege, Pannonia became an invasion corridor both in the north and in the south.
383	Pannonian grain is traded for wine in northern Italy.
395	The attacks of the Marcomanni, Hun and Goth armies devastate Pannonia.

== 5th century ==
Date	Event
401	The Vandals march through Pannonia to Italy.
402	The Visigoths led by Alaric arrives in Pannonia from Italy.
405	The army of the Goth Radagaisus marches through Pannonia and attacks the Western Roman Empire.
408	The Visigoths return to Italy.
c. 420s	The Huns settle on the Hungarian Plain.
427	Pannonia Secunda and Pannonia Savia are ceded to the Huns.
433	The control of Pannonia Valeria is given up to the Huns.
433	The Roman administration withdraws from Pannonia Prima, the land is ceded to the Huns.
442	Sirmium is under the control of the Huns.
c. 450s	Goths are settled in large numbers by Marcian in Pannonia.
c. 450s	After Attila's death, three Ostrogoth kingdoms come into existence. Western Pannonia is ruled by Theodemir, Vidimir controls the center region, the eastern parts of Pannonia belong to king Valamir.
c. 450s	Theoderic the Great, the son of the Ostrogoth King Theodemir, was presumably born in Pannonia.
453	King Attila died suddenly, resulting in the quick disintegration of his empire.
454	A coalition of Germanic tribes defeats the Huns in the Battle of Nedao.
454	Sirmium is under Gepid control.
455–456	Successful campaigns by the Western Roman emperor Avitus in Pannonia, praised later by Sidonius Apollinaris.
469	After Valamir's death, the Ostrogoths defeat the armies of the Germanic and Sarmatian tribes in the Battle of Bolia.
474	The Ostrogoths led by Theoderic migrate from Pannonia to Lower Moesia.

== 6th century ==
Date	Event
547	The Langobards settle in Pannonia, permitted by Justinian I.
c. 565	At the end of the reign of Justinian I, the Gepid-controlled Pannonian settlement of Sirmium is still a significant city, subsequently occupied by Justin II.
566/567	The Longobard king, Alboin, sends envoys to the Avar khagan, Bayan, offering an alliance against the Gepids to him. Bayan accepts the offer only after Gepidia is promised to him.
567	The Longobards and the Avars invade Gepidia. Cunimund, the last king of the Gepids, dies fighting against the Longobards. The Avars occupy Gepidia.
568, April	The Longobards and masses of Gepids, Sarmatians, Suebi and other peoples leave Pannonia for Italy. The Avars take possession of Pannonia.
568	The Avars, under Khagan Bayan I established an empire in the Carpathian Basin.
582	The fall of Byzantine Sirmium to the Avars.
595	The Kutrigurs, related peoples from the east arrived in the Avar Kaganate.

== 7th century ==
Date	Event
670	The Onogurs. related peoples from the east arrived in the Avar Kaganate.

== 8th century ==
Date	Event
776	A Lombard lord, Aio, seeks refuge in Avar territory after a Lombard revolt against the Franks collapsed.
782	The Avar khagan and jugurrus send envoys to Charlemagne to Paderborn.
788	Frank and Bavarian troops defeat an Avar army near the river Ybbs.
791, Late August	Charlemagne's son, King Pepin of Italy, makes a raid against Avar territory.
791, Autumn	Charlemagne invades Avar territory, reaching as far as the river Rába, but an epidemic forces him to return to the Carolingian Empire.
795, Autumn	Duke Eric of Friuli's Slav military commander, Vojnomir, sacks the khagan's seat.
795/796	Rebels murder the Khagan and the jugurrus.
796, Early	The Avar tudun swears fealty to Charlemagne and converts to Christianity.
796, Summer	Pepin of Italy invades Avar territory, forcing the khagan to yield without resistance and chasing Avar leaders as far as the river Tisza. Paulinus II, Patriarch of Aquileia and other bishops in Pepin's army decide to start proselytizing among the Avars.
799	Archbishop Arno of Salzburg appoints Theoderic to proselytize among the Carantans and their neighbors to the north of the river Dráva. Gerold, Prefect of Bavaria who accompanies Theoderic is killed before a battle against rebellious Avars.

== 9th century ==
Date	Event
	The Khazar Khagan appoints Levedi to be the supreme head of the confederation of the Magyar tribes, allegedly granting the Khazar title kündür to him.
	The Life of Saint Emmeram—a hagiography of Emmeram of Regensburg—is rewritten to encourage clergymen to proselytize among the Avars.
803	Charlemagne sends an army to Pannonia. The Avar tudun and his Slav and Avar retainers come to Regensburg to pay homage to Charlemagne.
c. 804	Krum, Khan of Bulgaria, invades Avar territory and defeats an Avar army.
805, February	Charlemagne cedes the territory between Sabaria (now Szombathely in Hungary) and Carnuntum (now Petronell-Carnuntum in Austria) to the Christian Avar kapkhan, Theodorus, and his people whom Slavs forced to leave their homeland.
805, September, 21	Charlemagne restores the khagan's authority over the Avars. The khagan converts to Christianity at the Fischa.
811, Spring	Charlemagne sends an army to Pannonia to prevent further clashes between the Avars and the Slavs.
811, July, 26	Battle of Pliska: The Hungarians were in alliance with Krum of Bulgaria against Emperor Nikephoros.
811, November	The envoys of the Avar khagan and tudun and of the chiefs of the Slavs living along the Danube appear in Charlemagne's court in Aachen.
c. 822	The collapse of the Avar Khaganate.
824	Khan Omurtag of Bulgaria sends an embassy to Louis the Pious, offering peace. Louis the Pious sends an envoy to Bulgaria.
825, May	Negotiations about the borders of the Carolingian Empire and Bulgaria in Aachen.
827	The Bulgars sail up the Dráva and destroy the lands on both sides of the river.
828	Louis the Pious's son, Louis the German, launches an unsuccessful military campaign against the Bulgars.
829	The Bulgars destroy villages along the Dráva.
c. 830	The Magyars settle in Etelköz (in the Pontic steppes) and get rid of Khazar suzerainty. The Kabars—a group of peoples who rose up against the Khagan—join them.
830s	Burials with consistent east–west orientation spread in Pannonia.
833	Expelled across the Danube by Prince Mojmir I of Moravia, Pribina comes to Pannonia. He is baptised and joins the retinue of Radbod, the newly appointed prefect of the March of Pannonia.
837	The Bulgarians hire Magyar warriors to prevent a group of Byzantine prisoners from returning to their homeland across the Lower Danube, but the Byzantines defeat the Magyars.
c. 837	After a conflict with Radbod, Pribina flees first to Bulgaria, then to Ratimir, Duke of Lower Pannonia.
838	After Radbod defeats Ratimir, Pribina and Radbod are reconciled. Pribina receives a large estate in fief on the Zala River.
840s, Early	Pribina gathers people on his domains and builds the fortress Mosaburg on the Zala (now Zalavár).
848, Early	The wandering Saxon priest, Gottschalk of Orbais, stays in Pannonia.
848, October, 12	Louis the German reward Pribina with the complete ownership of his estates in Pannonia.
850, January, 24	Liupramm, Archbishop of Salzburg consecrates a church dedicated to Mary the Virgin in Mosaburg.
860, May, 8	Louis the German grants 20 peasant households near Savaria to the Benedictine Mattsee Abbey.
860, November, 20	Louis the German grants Savaria and other settlements in Pannonia to Adalwin, Archbishop of Salzburg.
860s	Offerings of food and drink disappear in burials in Pannonia.
860/861	Pribina dies fighting against the Moravians. His son, Kocel, inherits his estates.
c. 861	Methodius comes across Magyar raiders in the Crimea.
862–895	The Hungarians took possession of the Carpathian Basin in a pre-planned manner, with a long move-in between 862 and 895.
862	The Magyars' first raid against East Francia (or Germany). (Note: Archaeologist Béla Miklós Szőke proposes that a Magyar groups has already settled along the Upper Tisza before their raid.)
866–867	The Byzantine missionaries, Constantine and Methodius, stay in Mosaburg during their journey from Moravia to Rome. Kocel learns the Glagolitic script and entrust 50 pupils to them.
869	Pope Hadrian II sanctions the use of Old Church Slavonic in liturgy. Methodius returns to Mosaburg as papal legate, but Kocel sends him back to Rome, requesting the Pope to appoint Methodius bishop of Pannonia. The Pope makes Methodius archbishop of Sirmium with jurisdiction in Pannonia and Moravia.
c. 870	The Magyars dominate the steppes between the Lower Danube and the river "Atil" (most probably the Don River). Their tribal confederation is headed by a paramount chief, the kende, and a military leader, the gyula.
870, Early	Bishop Ermanrich of Passau captures Methodius.
873, Spring	Pope John VIII achieves the release of Methodius.
c. 876	Kocel dies.
881	The Magyars and the Kabars make a plundering raid against the Duchy of Bavaria.
c. 892	According to scholarly theories, the first Magyar groups settle in the Carpathian Basin (in the lowlands east of the river Tisza).
892	Magyar horsemen support Arnulf, King of East Francia against King Svatopluk I of Moravia.
c. 894	Magyar raiders destroy Pannonia in alliance with Svatopluk I. After the Magyar leaders, Árpád and Kurszán conclude an alliance with the Byzantines against King Simeon I of Bulgaria, Magyar troops invade Bulgaria.
c. 895	Bulgarians and Pechenegs invade Etelköz while the bulk of the Magyar army is away on a military campaign. The Magyars leave Etelköz and cross the Carpathian Mountains to settle in the lowlands east of the Middle Danube.
896	Arnulf appoints Braslav, Duke of Lower Pannonia to rule Mosaburg and the March of Pannonia.
899, Summer	Arnulf persuades the Magyars (or Hungarians) to invade the Po Valley (in Italy).
899, September, 24	Battle of Brenta: the Hungarians route Arnulf's opponent, King Berengar I of Italy.
900	The Hungarians occupy Pannonia (to the west of the Middle Danube).

== 10th century ==
Date	Event
902	The Hungarians invade Moravia.
902–907	The Hungarians destroy Moravia.
904	The Bavarians murder Kurszán at a banquet.
907, July, 4–6	Battle of Pressburg: Three East Francian armies led by Luitpold, Margrave of Bavaria, which entered the Hungarian territory in order to expel the Hungarians from the Carpathian Basin, is annihilated by the Hungarian army. Luitpold, Margrave of Bavaria, Dietmar I, Archbishop of Salzburg, Prince Sieghard, 19 counts, 2 bishops, and 3 abbots are killed in the battle, together with the majority of the soldiers. The Hungarian army immediately attacked Bavaria, and the Bavarian army led by King Louis the Child was defeated at Ennsburg. The Hungarians defeated other Bavarian armies at Regensburg, Lengenfeld. The Hungarian victory forced the new Bavarian prince, Luitpold's son, Arnulf to conclude a peace treaty, the prince recognized the loss of Pannonia and Ostmark, pushing Hungary's borders deep in the Bavarian territory, the river Enns became borderline, paid tribute, and agreed to let the Hungarian armies, which went to war against Germany or other countries in Western Europe, to pass through the duchies lands.
908, August, 3	Battle of Eisenach: A crushing victory by a Hungarian army over an East Frankish army composed of troops from Franconia, Saxony, and Thuringia.
910, June, 12	Battle of Augsburg: An important victory by a Hungarian army over the combined forces of East Francia and Swabia under the nominal command of Louis the Child.
910, June, 22	Battle of Rednitz: The Hungarian army entered Franconia, and defeated a united army of the duchies of Franconia, Lotharingia and Bavaria.
919, Summer	Battle of Püchen: Hungarian victory over Henry the Fowler, the East Francian king.
926	Henry I, King of East Francia, agrees to pay an annual tribute to the Hungarians to prevent their raids.
932	Henry I denies to pay further tributes.
933, March, 15	Battle of Riade: Henry I defeats the Hungarians who has invaded the Duchy of Saxony.
934	The Hungarians and Pechenegs make a joint plundering raid against the Byzantine Empire. The Byzantines agrees to pay a yearly tribute.
c. 948	A high-ranking Magyar chieftain, the horka Bulcsú visited the court of Byzantine Emperor Constantine VII, where he was received with a great pomp. Bulcsú adopted Christianity, the emperor became his godfather. He was a "guest friend of the Byzantine emperor" and was awarded the title of "Roman patrician".
c. 949	The second-ranking Magyar chieftain, Gylas, is baptised in Constantinople. The Ecumenical Patriarch consecrates a Greek monk, Hierotheos, bishop of Tourkia (or Hungary) and Hierotheos accompanies Gylas back to Hungary.
c. 950	Árpád's grandson, Fajsz, is the paramount leader of the confederation of the seven Magyar tribes and the Kabars.
955, August, 10	Second Battle of Lechfeld: a battle between the Hungarian warriors led by chieftains Lehel, Vérbulcsú, Súr against Otto I, King of Germany and his generals. The Hungarians were supporting a nationwide German uprising against Otto. Both sides suffered heavy casualties, with the Germans losing several generals and high priests, and the Hungarian chieftains mentioned being captured and executed. Lehel, according to the medieval chronicles, slew Conrad (prince or "emperor" of the Germans) with his great horn.
958	Chieftain Apor and Botond the Brave raid Constantinople.
960s–990s	Hungary and Bavaria make several agreements in which the lands between the Enns and the Leitha go to the Bavarians.
970, March	Battle of Arcadiopolis: the Byzantines defeat the united Rus', Bulgarian and Hungarian armies.
970s, Early	German and Italian missionaries came to Hungary. Géza, Grand Prince of the Hungarians—Árpád's great-grandson—is baptised, but he does not fully abandon the veneration of pagan deities.
973, Easter	Hungarian delegates are present at Otto I's court in Quedlinburg.
984	The Hungarians raid Austria.
996	Géza, Grand Prince of Hungary renounced the lands west of the river Leitha in his peace treaty of 996 with Henry IV of Bavaria. The river Leitha became the historic border between the Kingdom of Hungary and the Holy Roman Empire.
c. 997	Géza's son, Stephen, marries Gisela, a relative of Otto III, Holy Roman Emperor who is accompanied by German knights to Hungary.
997	Géza dies and his kinsman, Koppány, contests Stephen's right to succeed his father. German knights assist Stephen to defeat Koppány.
c. 1000	The establishment of the earliest Benedictine abbey, Pannonhalma and of the first Roman Catholic dioceses (Veszprém, Esztergom and Győr). (Note: The Pannonhalma Archabbey and the bishopric of Veszprém may have been set up already during Géza's reign.)
1000, December, 25	Stephen is crowned the first king of Hungary in Esztergom. (Note: Alternatively, Stephen may have been crowned on 1 January 1001.)

== 11th century ==
Date	Event
1000s	Stephen I issues his earliest decrees, ordering the building of churches and prohibiting pagan practices. (Note: The dating of Stephen I's first decrees is uncertain.)
1002–1009	The first counties—territorial units of royal administration—are mentioned in royal charters. Each county was headed by an appointed royal official, styled ispán (or count).
c. 1003	Ajtony a chieftain ruling Banat is baptised in Vidin. He establishes a Greek monastery in his seat at Morisena (now Cenad in Romania).
1003	Stephen I invades Transylvania, forcing his maternal uncle, Gyula, into submission.
1018	Stephen I opens Hungary to pilgrims coming from Western Europe to Jerusalem.
c. 1020	Bishop Fulbert of Chartres sends a copy of Priscian's Grammar to Bonipert, Bishop of Pécs, implying the existence of a cathedral school at Pécs.
1020s	A king's mirror entitled Admonitions is completed in Hungary.
c. 1028	Stephen I's military commander, Csanád, defeats Ajtony. Ajtony's realm is transformed into a county. The Greek monks are transferred from Morisena to a nearby monastery and a Roman Catholic diocese is set up in Ajtony's former seat (which is renamed for Csanád).
1030	Conrad II, Holy Roman Emperor, invades Hungary, but the Hungarians repel his attack.
1031	Stephen I's son and heir, Emeric, dies unexpectedly.
1030s	Stephen I appoints his sister's son, the Venetian Peter Orseolo, to be his heir. Stephen I's cousin, Vazul, is executed and Vazul's sons—Andrew, Béla and Levente—are forced into exile.
1046	András the White, his brother Levente and chief Vata succeeded in overthrowing Peter Orseolo. However, Vata's uprising was suppressed by András after it had served his purpose and he had become king.
1070s	The power conflict in the royal family caused a civil war. It lasted up to Solomon's abdication in favor of one of his cousins, Ladislaus, in the early 1080s.

== 12th century ==
Date	Event
1102	The Kingdom of Croatia entered a personal union with the Kingdom of Hungary with the coronation of King Coloman as "King of Croatia and Dalmatia" in Biograd.
1195	Béla III expanded the kingdom southward and westward to Bosnia and Dalmatia and extended suzerainty over Serbia, a process that helped to break up the Byzantine Empire and diminish its influence in the Balkan region.

== Sources ==
- Arnold, Jonathan J. (2014). Theoderic and the Roman Imperial Restoration. Cambridge University Press. ISBN 9781107054400.
- Berend, Nora; Urbańczyk, Przemysław; Wiszewski, Przemysław (2013). Central Europe in the High Middle Ages: Bohemia, Hungary and Poland, c. 900-c. 1300. Cambridge University Press. ISBN 978-0-521-78156-5.
- Burns, Thomas S. (2003). Rome and the Barbarians, 100 B.C.–A.D. 400 (in Hungarian). The Johns Hopkins University Press. ISBN 0-8018-7306-1.
- Crabtree, Pamela (2013). Medieval Archaeology. Routledge. ISBN 9781135582982.
- Fodor, István (2009). Magyarország története 1.: Őstörténet és honfoglalás [A History of Hungary, Volume 1: Pre-History and Conquest] (in Hungarian). Kossuth Kiadó. ISBN 978-963-09-5679-6.
- Heather, Peter (2005). The fall of the Roman Empire. A new history. Hardback London, Macmillan. ISBN 978-0-333-98914-2.
- Hajnóczi, Julius Gyula; Redő, Ferenc (1998). Pannonia Hungarica Antiqua. Archaeolingua. ISBN 9789638046116.
- Johnson, Scott Fitzgerald (2012). The Oxford Handbook of Late Antiquity. Oxford University Press. ISBN 9780199996339.
- Kardaras, Georgios (2018). Byzantium and the Avars, 6th-9th c. A. D.: Political, diplomatic and cultural relations. Brill. ISBN 9789004382268.
- Kontler, László (1999). Millennium in Central Europe: A History of Hungary. Atlantisz Publishing House. ISBN 963-9165-37-9.
- Lengyel, Alfonz; Radan, George T. (1980). The Archaeology of Roman Pannonia. University Press of Kentucky. ISBN 9789630518864.
- Mócsy, András (1974). Pannonia and Upper Moesia: A History of the Middle Danube Provinces of the Roman Empire. Routledge & Kegan Paul. ISBN 0-7100-7714-9.
- Nemerkényi, Előd (2004). Latin Classics in Medieval Hungary: Eleventh Century. Central European University Press. ISBN 9637326049.
- Pohl, Walter (2018). The Avars: A Steppe Empire in Central Europe, 567-822. Cornell University Press. ISBN 9780801442100.
- Spinei, Victor (2003). The Great Migrations in the East and South East of Europe from the Ninth to the Thirteenth Century. ISBN 973-85894-5-2.
- Stephenson, Paul (2000). Byzantium's Balkan Frontier: A Political Study of the Northern Balkans, 900–1204. Cambridge University Press. ISBN 978-0-521-02756-4.
- Syvänne, Ilka (2015). Military History of Late Rome, 284–361. Pen & Sword Military. ISBN 978-1-84884-855-9.
- Szőke, Béla Miklós (2014). The Carolingian Age in the Carpathian Basin. Hungarian National Museum. ISBN 978-615-5209-17-8.
- Toch, Michael (2012). The Economic History of European Jews: Late Antiquity and Early Middle Ages. Brill. ISBN 9789004235397.
- Wilkes, John (1992). The Illyrians. ISBN 978-0-631-19807-9.
- Wolfram, Herwig (1997). The Roman Empire and Its Germanic Peoples. University of California Press. ISBN 9780520085114.
- Wolfram, Herwig (1990). History of the Goths. University of California Press. ISBN 9780520069831.
