= Scordisci =

Ancient people of the central Balkans

The Scordisci (Ancient Greek: Σκορδίσκοι; Latin: Scordisci) were an ancient people who lived around the confluence of the Sava and the Danube, in the central Balkans and southern Pannonia, from the 3rd to the 1st century BC. The literary tradition connects them with the Gauls who invaded the Balkans and attacked Delphi in 279 BC, and ancient writers describe them at different points as Celts, Thracians or Illyrians. In the 2nd century BC they were the dominant military power in the region, waging repeated wars against Rome, before being subdued under Augustus. Whether they formed a single Celtic tribe or a composite group given a collective name by outside observers is debated.

== Name ==
=== Attestations ===
The name is recorded in Greek as Skordískoi (Σκορδίσκοι), with the variant Skordístai (Σκορδίσται), and in Latin as Scordisci, with the variant Cordisci. Greek and Latin authors mention the people from the 2nd century BC onwards, almost always in connection with their wars along the middle Danube and in the Balkans. Strabo refers to them repeatedly. They are also named by Livy, Pliny the Elder, Velleius Paterculus, Appian, Ptolemy, Justin, Festus, Eutropius, Ammianus Marcellinus and Jordanes.

The name appears comparatively late. A civic decree from Lete honouring the quaestor Marcus Annius (119 BC) still calls his opponents only by the broad Galatae ('Celts'). The earliest text to attach the name is a victory monument of the praetor Marcus Minucius Rufus, set up in identical wording at Europos in the Vardar valley and at Delphi, recording a Roman victory over the Galatae Scordistae ('Celtic Scordisci') among the peoples he defeated between 110 and 106 BC On this basis Vladimir Mihajlović argues that the name is not securely attested before the middle of the 2nd century BC, and that no source earlier than Posidonius, writing around 135–51 BC, records a population by this name.

=== Etymology ===
The origin of the name is uncertain, and several explanations have been advanced. Alexander Falileyev argues that the name Scordisci is probably non-Celtic, or at most a hybrid, in keeping with the linguistically composite character of the region.

It has traditionally been derived from Mount Scordus, the ancient name of the Šar Mountains, which lay within the territory the Scordisci controlled. Another hypothesis connects the name with Latin scordiscus, a term of Roman military usage denoting a saddle or the leather pad placed beneath it. Vladimir Mihajlović observes that several sources link the Scordisci with cavalry, Frontinus describing them as horsemen and Festus as 'wandering Thracians'. On this reading the ethnonym would be a descriptive exonym, meaning 'those who use a saddle' or simply 'mounted men'. Ivan Drnić regards the suggestion as speculative but consistent with the archaeological record.

Metodi Manov has also proposed that an inscribed object in the National Archaeological Museum at Sofia names an eponymous deity, Scordos (genitive Skordou), from which the people would take their name, and Krzysztof Tomasz Witczak has suggested in passing that the name may be a totemic formation meaning 'lizard-people', comparable in formation to Albanian hardhjeshkë (< *skord-iskā), ultimately from an Indo-European word for 'lizard' (*skord-ulā) reflected in Albanian hardhël and Greek skordýlē.

== Ethnic identity ==
The ethnic affiliation of the Scordisci has long been disputed, and the question turns on how far ancient labels such as 'Celtic', 'Thracian' and 'Illyrian' can be taken as reliable descriptions of ancient ethnic groups. The confusion begins with the ancient writers themselves. The literary tradition derives them from the Gauls who took part in the expedition against Delphi led by Brennus in 279 BC. Strabo describes them as a mixed population, associating them at different points with Celts, Thracians and Illyrians, and distinguishes a larger and a smaller division, the 'Greater' and the 'Lesser Scordisci'. Roman writers more often treat them as Thracians, such as in the Periochae of Livy and the epitome of Florus. Plutarch calls the territory of the Danubian Scordisci 'Lower Galatia' (hē katō Galatia), implying a Celtic territory. Appian places them within a late form of the Greek myth of Illyrian origins.

The traditional scholarly account treats them as a warrior-dominated Celtic group whose heartland was the Danube bank between the Drava and the Danube gorge, intermixed with older strata of Illyrians, Dacians and Thracians, and with a settled Celtic majority only in the lower Morava valley. Even within this view the Celtic character is qualified. Borislav Jovanović held that the Scordisci were never a pure Celtic tribe but a mixture of Celts and the local population, formed before the Delphi campaign. András Mócsy described them as only a thin Celtic upper class gradually absorbed by the more numerous native population, which is why the sources call them now Celts, now Thracians, and why by the end of the 2nd century BC they bear the 'Illyrian' suffix of Scordistae. On this account they were merely one of the Celts' political creations and not a Celtic tribe.

The question has been pursued through the personal names recorded in the Roman period. Géza Alföldy identified fifteen Celtic names among the Scordisci of the middle Drina and the western Morava, and read them as evidence that the people survived into Roman times. Radoslav Katičić pruned this list sharply, judging only three of the names certainly Celtic and a further four possible, and argued that the Celtic element reflects contacts with the Celtic world after the Roman conquest rather than the survival of the Scordisci themselves. The name Scordisci itself appears to be of non-Celtic origin, and the toponymy of the region is mixed, combining Gaulish, indigenous and hybrid forms. Mócsy notes that the personal names recorded in the Scordiscan part of south-east Pannonia belong to the central Dalmatian–Pannonian onomastic group and show no significant Celtic element, the names being Illyricised in general and, in the area east of the Morava, Thracianised.

More recent scholarship has reframed the question of ethnic identity as one shaped largely by external Graeco-Roman categories. Danijel Džino argues that Strabo's report of a 'Celto-Thraco-Illyrian mixture' reflects his way of perceiving 'barbarian' identity rather than an accurate description, and that the local population constructed a hybrid, or in effect a new, Scordiscan identity by recasting the categories outsiders applied to them. Vladimir Mihajlović likewise treats the name as a Roman construct. In his reading the available evidence does not support a clearly defined ethnic tribe with a fixed territory and a single culture, the name emerges only in the context of Rome's wars with the peoples north of Macedonia, and the term served to mark new enemies within the Roman picture of the barbarian world.

This reading is supported on archaeological grounds. Ivan Drnić finds no rupture in the material record that would mark the arrival of a new people, and reads the spread of La Tène culture as a wider process of 'latènization' driven by the movement of small groups and by local adoption, rather than as the formation of a tribal alliance. Following Aurel Rustoiu, he describes the movement of population in the region as a slow colonisation by colonists seeking land or ore, led by warrior bands and by mercenaries, not as a mass migration. On this view the name designates not a single tribe but a set of communities of varied composition, given a common label as Roman control advanced.

== Geography ==
The Scordisci occupied much of the territory of modern Serbia and some adjacent lands. The earliest grouping, in the 3rd century BC, had its core in the region between the Sava and the Danube, the modern Srem, at whose confluence stood their principal settlement, Singidunum (modern Belgrade). To the north-west they bordered the Taurisci and to the north probably the Hercuniates. Their southern limits followed the line of the mountains held by populations of Illyrian stock, while they held the lower courses of the main tributaries of the Sava, the Bosna and the Drina, and controlled the Great Morava valley to some way above Niš, with the routes leading into Macedonia and Thrace.

In the 2nd century BC the area under their control reached its greatest extent. According to András Mócsy, the boundary with the Taurisci lay west of Siscia, and the territory they dominated covered much of what later became Moesia Superior. Strabo reports that their power reached as far as Paeonia, Illyria and Thrace.

Ancient and modern authors distinguish two divisions. The Greater Scordisci held the core between the Sava and the Danube. The Lesser Scordisci, formed from the 2nd century BC, lay downstream on both banks of the Danube, in Oltenia and the region of Vidin and Vratsa in northern Bulgaria, and were of mixed Scordiscan and indigenous Thracian and Daco-Getic composition. Strabo places the boundary between the two at the Danube. (Note: Strabo sets the boundary between the Greater and the Lesser Scordisci at the Danube. Venceslas Kruta instead locates it at the Iron Gates.)

The place-names of the region are linguistically mixed, combining Gaulish, non-Celtic and hybrid formations, which Alexander Falileyev takes to mirror the composite character of the population. Vladimir Mihajlović stresses that the archaeological record across this territory is not uniform, the density of settlements and cemeteries varying markedly from one area to another, which in his view tells against treating the whole as a single people.

== History ==
=== Origins and formation (3rd century BC) ===
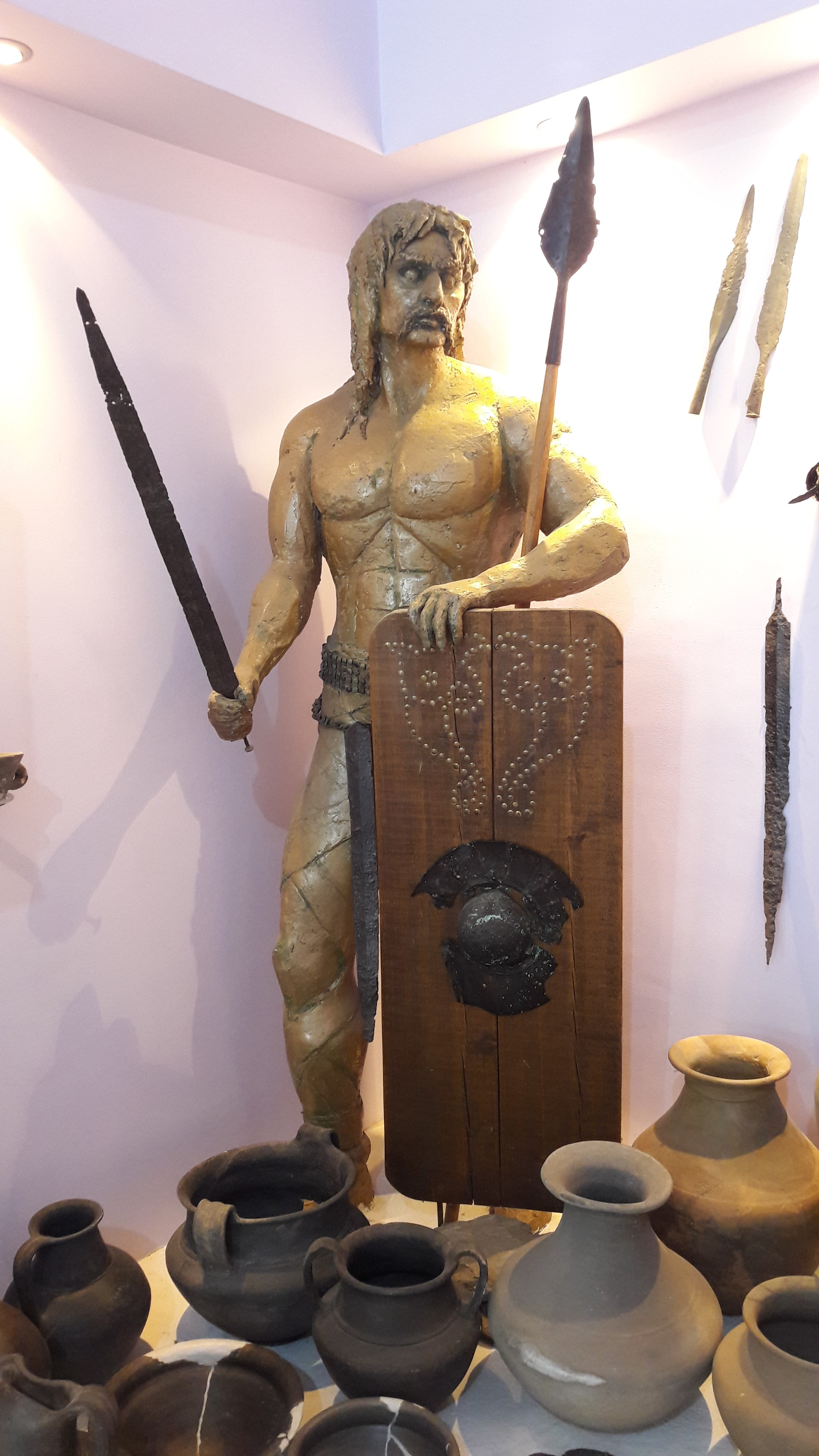
Scordisci warrior, National museum in Požarevac, Serbia

The ancient tradition derives the Scordisci from the Gauls who invaded the Balkans and attacked Delphi in 279 BC. After the failure of that campaign, part of the host is said to have withdrawn to the confluence of the Sava and the Danube under a leader named Bathanatus, settling there about 279/278 BC and taking the name Scordisci. Through the first half of the 3rd century BC they are reported at war with the native populations of Pannonia and the interior of the Balkans.

The character of this formation is disputed. On the archaeological evidence Borislav Jovanović argued that the fusion of Celtic and indigenous elements had begun in the second half of the 4th century BC, before the Delphi campaign, and that the people who emerged were not a purely Celtic tribe but a mixture of Celts and the local Early Iron Age population. Recent work questions whether any mass migration took place at all, stressing instead the gradual spread of La Tène culture through smaller groups and the local adoption of its forms.

=== Wars with Rome (2nd–1st century BC) ===
A period of relative stability on the northern Macedonian frontier lasted through the later 3rd and earlier 2nd century BC, while Hellenistic rulers drew on the military services of the peoples to their north. This order broke down after the fall of the Macedonian kingdom and the creation of the Roman province of Macedonia in 148–146 BC. From the middle of the 2nd century the Scordisci were the strongest power in the central Balkans, controlling much of the area that later became Moesia Superior, with the western Thracian tribes, among them the Maidoi, as their habitual allies.

The first conflicts went in their favour. In 156 BC the consuls Lucius Lentulus and Gaius Marcius defeated the Dalmatians and the Scordisci, who had fought as allies of the Pannonians, and in 141 BC the Scordisci defeated the Romans on their own account. The praetor Marcus Cosconius campaigned against them in Thrace in 135 BC. From about 120 BC they began frequent raids into the province of Macedonia. In 119 BC the Scordisci killed the praetor Sextus Pompeius, the Roman commander in Macedonia, before the quaestor Marcus Annius defeated them near Lete, both events being recorded in the honorific decree set up there. A series of fierce wars followed in which Roman commanders fared badly: Quintus Fabius Maximus Eburnus was defeated in 116/115 BC and Gaius Porcius Cato in 114/113 BC. About 114 BC the Cimbri, pushed back by the Boii, reached the Danube and the Scordiscan Galatae before moving on to the Taurisci and the Helvetii. Throughout these wars the Scordisci kept their hold on the Sava valley, taking part in the fighting when the Romans besieged Siscia in 156 and again in 119 BC.

Rome then gained the upper hand. Gaius Caecilius Metellus Caprarius triumphed over the Scordisci in 113/112 BC and Marcus Livius Drusus in 112/111 BC. (Note: The sources differ on the outcome of Drusus' campaign. Festus, Ammianus Marcellinus and Jordanes record that he held or defeated the Scordisci within their own territory, whereas Florus states that he drove them beyond the Danube and forbade them to cross it. Fanula Papazoglu rejects the latter claim, since Roman legions only reached the Danube several decades later, and places the campaign in the eastern Morava basin rather than in Thrace.) Marcus Minucius Rufus campaigned successfully in 110/109 BC, the victory commemorated on the inscriptions at Europos and Delphi. After 108 BC the southward raids ceased, and about two decades of quiet followed.

The wars resumed in the early 1st century BC. The Scordisci are listed among the peoples brought under Roman authority by Sulla in 85 BC, and in 84 BC Lucius Cornelius Scipio Asiaticus inflicted a heavy defeat on them. Between 74 and 70 BC Gaius Scribonius Curio reached the bank of the Danube by way of the Timok valley.

=== Decline (1st century BC – 1st century AD) ===
Around 50 BC the Dacians expanded into Pannonia under Burebista. The Scordisci were at first his allies, but he later subdued them. The Illyrian campaign of Octavian in 35–33 BC brought Roman forces close to them from the north-west as well.

The Scordisci remained a threat to Macedonia even in 15 BC, despite the loss of their former standing. In 16 BC, together with the Dentheletae, they ravaged Macedonia, the last such raid recorded, at the time of the campaign of Publius Silius against the Alpine tribes. The young Tiberius led a punitive campaign against them, most probably in 14 BC, after which they appear in the sources only as allies of Rome. Velleius Paterculus counts the Scordisci among the peoples newly brought under Roman control by Tiberius. With the suppression of the Pannonian revolts of 11–8 BC their territory was annexed.

By the time of the Roman conquest the Scordisci had greatly declined in numbers and importance. After the conquest the Scordisci were divided among several provinces, living in eastern Pannonia and the Srem region, in Dalmatia and in Moesia. They held no independent civitas bearing their name outside Pannonia, where one community in Syrmia formed the civitas Scordiscorum, attested by the offices of princeps and praefectus. Roman citizenship began to appear among the communities of south-east Pannonia, the Scordisci among them, only under Trajan.

== Settlement and material culture ==
The Scordisci are associated with the La Tène culture of the last three centuries BC. The richest evidence comes from their cemeteries. The largest is at Karaburma and Rospi Ćuprija in Belgrade, where some ninety-six graves run from the early La Tène period into the 1st century AD, and a comparable sequence is known at Pećine near Kostolac. Burials with weapons in the La Tène style appear at Karaburma from the first half of the 3rd century BC, most containing a sword and a spear and many a shield and a chain belt, alongside elements of local tradition such as the curved sica knife and certain forms of jewellery and pottery. The continuity of burial across these centuries, without a break that would mark the arrival of a new population, is central to recent readings of the people's formation. Finds of La Tène type, mostly of local production, are concentrated in Pannonia and the northern part of Moesia Superior, and are scarce south of the Sava, where Scordiscan control was only intermittent. Among the settlements named in the ancient sources, Capedunon, named only by Strabo, has been tentatively located near modern Užice, and Taurunum (modern Zemun) is identified as a Celtic oppidum.

Settlements are known mainly from the later 2nd and the 1st century BC, when both open and fortified sites appear in numbers, most densely in Srem, eastern Slavonia and southern Bačka. The fortified sites differ from the oppida of central and western Europe in their size and layout, and none is large enough to stand out as a tribal centre or seat of power. On Mihajlović's analysis of the settlements and the cemeteries, the evidence points to a heterarchical society without marked hierarchy or central authority, rather than to a centralised tribal state. The 1st century BC saw a flourishing of settlement and craft production, well documented at Gomolava.

From the later 2nd century BC the Scordisci struck their own coinage, silver pieces imitating Macedonian and other Hellenistic prototypes, alongside bronze issues. The circulation of foreign currency, including coins of Apollonia and Dyrrhachium and Roman republican denarii, points to expanding exchange in this period.

== Religion ==
The Roman sources dwell on the cruelty attributed to the Scordisci. Ammianus Marcellinus reports, on earlier authority, that they sacrificed prisoners to deities he identifies with Bellona and Mars and drank human blood from skulls, while Orosius describes them severing the heads of prisoners to use the skulls as drinking-cups. Fanula Papazoglu cautions that such reports are open to doubt, as they reflect the indignation of those who might themselves have become the victims of these practices.
