= Arabiates =

Ancient people of Pannonia

The Arabiates (also Arviates or Aruiates) were a people of Roman Pannonia, in the west of the province, recorded only by Pliny the Elder. They are usually regarded not as a pre-Roman tribe but as a civitas organised by the Romans after the conquest and named after the river Arrabo (modern Rába). The Arabiates are generally held to be Celtic, though the affiliation of the name itself is uncertain. Absent from the later list of Ptolemy, their civitas had been absorbed into a Roman municipium by the reign of Hadrian (117–138 AD).

== Name ==
The Arabiates are named only by Pliny the Elder, in the list of populorum capita (principal peoples) of Pannonia in his Natural History. The name occurs nowhere else and is absent from the tribal list of Ptolemy. The form printed in modern editions of Pliny is Arviates (or Aruiates). Arabiates, the reading of the Leiden manuscript, is the form generally used in modern scholarship, in part because of its resemblance to the river-name. Further manuscript variants are Arinates and Ariuates.

The name carries the suffix -ati- found in Celtic ethnonyms, as in that of the neighbouring Hercuniates. On the reading Aruiates, Peter Anreiter has connected it with a Celtic unnattested river name *arvi(j)ā (compared with Latin arvum, 'ploughed field'), while also allowing a Pannonian interpretation. On the reading Arabiates, the name has been instead connected with the river Arrabo (the modern Rába), whose own name has been analysed as Celtic *ar(e)- ('eastern') and *abōn ('river'). However, this has been criticised since it cannot account for the -i- in Arabi-ates. Alexander Falileyev regards the Celtic character of the name as plausible but not assured, a Pannonian interpretation remaining possible in view of its unclear form and single attestation.

== Geography ==
Pliny lists the Arabiates among the principal peoples of Pannonia but does not locate them. The name is otherwise unrecorded, so their position can be established only indirectly. Based on the link between their and the river Arrabo (Rába), modern scholarship places them in western Transdanubia, in what is now western Hungary, in the region of that river. András Mócsy set their civitas between the Serapilli and the Boii, in a border zone, probably between the spheres of the Boii and the Taurisci, within the territory of the former Boian power.

== History ==
The Arabiates appear only under the early Empire. András Mócsy and Péter Kovács take them not for a pre-Roman tribe but for a civitas formed by the Roman administration after the conquest of Pannonia. During the reorganisation of the former territory of the Boii, its Latin name was possibly drawn from the river Arrabo. Unlike the Roman civitates of the Sava valley, which were carved out of the lands of the Breuci and Amantini, the Arabiates and the Hercuniates were, in Mócsy's view, entirely new units created in border zones.

Their civitas cannot have disappeared before the foundation of Savaria under Claudius (41–54). It had ceased to exist by the time the Pannonian municipia were established under Hadrian (117–138), its territory passing to one of them. (Note: Kovács tentatively assigns the territory of the combined civitas of the Belgites and Arabiates to the municipium of Salla, the modern Zalalövő.) Their absence from the list of Ptolemy, whose information reaches the reign of Hadrian, is consistent with this.
