= Hercuniates =

Ancient Celtic people of Pannonia

The Hercuniates (also Hercuniatae or Hercyniates) were a Celtic people of Roman Pannonia, in the southern part of Transdanubia in present-day Hungary. They are recorded by Pliny and Ptolemy, and under the Roman Empire they were one of the peregrine communities (civitates) of Pannonia Inferior. Their name derives from the same Celtic element as that of the Hercynian Forest, ultimately the Indo-European word for the oak.

== Name ==
The people are named by Pliny, who lists the Hercuniates among the chief peoples of Pannonia, and by Ptolemy, who places the Herkouniátes (Ἑρκουνιάτες) in Pannonia Inferior. The form Hercyniatae also occurs.

The ethnonym is Celtic and is built on the same element as the name of the Hercynian Forest (Latin Hercynia silva), a Gaulish *(p)erkunyā going back to the Indo-European word for the oak, *perkʷus, with the regular loss of initial p- in Celtic. (Note: The Celtic etymology of Hercynia has occasionally been questioned, notably by Kim McCone.) The ethnic name is formed with the Celtic suffix -at-, which is well attested in the tribal names of the region. The word denoted an oak forest, and by extension a wooded upland, and the same root underlies the Germanic names of several such ranges (such as Old High German Firgunnea, the Ore Mountains).

== Geography ==
The Hercuniates lived in the south-west of modern Hungary, in southern Transdanubia, roughly the area of Somogy and Tolna and the northern part of Baranya. In the corresponding lists of Pliny and Ptolemy they appear south of the Eravisci, whose territory lay around Aquincum (modern Budapest), and north of the Andizetes and Breuci towards the Save and Drave. In Ptolemy's account the Hercuniates are listed below the Amantini, but it is generally held that Ptolemy confused the Amantini with the Eravisci, so that the people immediately to the north were in fact the Eravisci. In the Barrington Atlas the people are placed in southern Transdanubia.

Their western neighbours are less certain. The Belgites, a people named only by Pliny, are placed by some scholars in the same region, whether to the north or to the south of Lake Balaton, and the Celtic material of the area between the lake and the Drave has been attributed either to the Hercuniates or to the Belgites.

== History ==
=== Origins ===
The name of the Hercuniates, formed on that of the Hercynian forest, was taken by András Mócsy to preserve a tradition that the people had come from the north, and he connected them with the southward movement of Celtic groups into the Carpathian basin in the first half of the 1st century BC. When the Dacians broke the power of the Boii around the middle of that century, the former Boian lands along the Danube were left to a number of smaller groups, among them the Boii, Azali, Eravisci and Hercuniates. Mócsy regarded the Hercuniates as a community newly constituted under Roman authority in a border zone between the formerly Boian Celts and the Pannonians.

=== Roman period ===
Pannonia was annexed under Augustus and organised as a province under Tiberius, its administrative framework probably not completed until after AD 8. The Hercuniates have been counted among the peoples of Pannonia whose names the Romans drew from geographical features, although the name is itself Celtic, and the local La Tène population of southern Transdanubia has been identified with the people. They were organised as a civitas peregrina, a self-governing community of non-citizens, in Pannonia Inferior. A funerary inscription from Intercisa records a man who died in his home community, given in the abbreviated form HE, which has been read as the civitas Hercuniatium, though the same abbreviation could stand for the Eravisci. No military diplomas issued to Hercuniate auxiliaries are known, although there is some slight evidence of recruitment among them in the 1st century.

The later status of the people is disputed. Mócsy held that, unlike the Eravisci and Azali, the Hercuniates were not raised to municipal rank under Hadrian but remained a civitas peregrina, the municipium known only as Volg(...) on an inscription from Intercisa, otherwise unlocated, being a possible centre of the territory when it was eventually municipalised. Péter Kovács, by contrast, held that the civitas ceased to exist no later than Hadrian's reign, when Roman municipalities were founded in its territory, and proposed that Iovia was founded in the territory of the Hercuniates and Valcum/Volgum in that of the Belgites, while stressing that the identification cannot be resolved.

== Settlement and material culture ==
The region assigned to the Hercuniates has yielded numerous La Tène C and D settlements and cemeteries, concentrated around Keszthely and Lake Balaton, together with the oppida of Regöly and Szalacska and a Celtic coin mint. No Celtic finds are known south of Kaposvár. This material has been attributed to the Hercuniates or to the Belgites. In the civitas Hercuniatium, south of that of the Eravisci, wagon-burials occur, but no tombstones set up by natives are known, which Mócsy ascribed to the absence among the local aristocracy of the wealth or the cultural and political incentive to commemorate themselves in Roman fashion.
