= Catari =

Ancient people of Pannonia

The Catari were an ancient people listed by Pliny the Elder among the peoples of Pannonia. They occupied the southern part of the territory of the colony of Emona (modern Ljubljana), near the frontier between Pannonia and Italy. Their linguistic affiliation is disputed, and the personal names recorded in their territory combine northern Adriatic (Venetic) and Celtic elements. Their peregrine civitas was short-lived and ceased to exist when Emona and its district passed to Italy in the 1st century AD.

== Name ==
The Catari are named only by Pliny the Elder, who lists them among the inland peoples of Pannonia, between the Belgites and the Cornacates. They do not appear in the geography of Ptolemy.

The affiliation of the people and of their name is disputed. András Mócsy regarded the Catari as a Venetic-Liburnian people. Peter Anreiter instead derived the ethnonym from a Celtic stem *katro- 'strong', while also allowing a Pannonian origin. (Note: Anreiter also compared the name with the word for 'town, fortress' (Old Irish cathair, Welsh cader), but this is not accepted. Welsh cader (with Cornish cadar and Middle Breton cadoer) is a borrowing from Latin cathedra, while Old Irish cathair (cognate with Welsh caer) goes back to a Proto-Irish *katrik- 'fortification' of uncertain origin, perhaps an early loan from Latin castrum or even non-Indo-European.) The personal names recorded in their territory combine northern Adriatic (Venetic) and Celtic elements.

== Geography ==
The Catari held the southern part of the territory of the colony of Emona (modern Ljubljana), in the region of the upper Save, and are relatively well documented in inscriptions.

Although Pliny counts the Catari among the peoples of Pannonia, the status of Emona and its territory is debated. Péter Kovács takes the appearance of the Catari and the Taurisci in Pliny's Pannonian list as evidence that Emona was reckoned to Pannonia in the 1st century AD, whereas Radman-Livaja and Ivezić place the area south of Emona outside the borders of the province.

== History ==
After the Roman conquest the Catari formed a peregrine civitas, one of those of the upper Save valley. Their civitas ceased to exist, and their territory passed to Italy together with Emona in the course of the 1st century AD.
