= Eravisci =

Ancient people of Pannonia

The Eravisci (also Aravisci) were an ancient people of northern Pannonia, settled around Aquincum in the area of modern Budapest. They are generally regarded as Celtic, although the origin of their name and their ethnic affiliation have been disputed since antiquity. They are known above all for their own silver coinage, struck under Augustus, and for the civitas Eraviscorum, the peregrine community that bore their name until it was absorbed into the municipium of Aquincum under Hadrian.

== Name ==
The people are named by Pliny the Elder, who lists the Eravisci among the chief peoples of Pannonia, and by Ptolemy as Aravisci, placed in Pannonia Inferior. Tacitus likewise gives the form Aravisci. The tribal name also appears on the people's own coinage, in forms such as RAVIZ and IRAVSCI. Although ancient Graeco-Roman sources generally use the form Aravisci, the inscriptions and coin legends give Eravisc-, which leads modern scholarship to prefer the form Eravisci. It is unclear which is the earlier form.

The etymology of the name is also uncertain. A Celtic derivation has been suggested (*aro-auo-isco), but it has more often been taken for a Celticised Pannonian formation. Péter Kovács has connected it with the nearby river Arrabo, which itself has been analysed as Celtic *ar(e)- ('eastern') and *abōn ('river').

== Ethnic identity ==
The affiliation of the people has been debated since antiquity. Péter Kovács calls them "one of the most controversial Pannonian tribes". In the Germania, Tacitus reports that the Aravisci and the Osi shared a single language, leaving open whether the Aravisci had migrated into Pannonia from the Osi, or the Osi into Germania from the Aravisci. Because Tacitus elsewhere states that the Osi spoke a Pannonian tongue, earlier scholars inferred that the Aravisci were Illyrians. The study of the indigenous personal names, however, has shown them to be thoroughly Celtic and most closely related to the Norican and Boian onomastic stock, so that the people are now generally held to have spoken a Celtic language. According to András Mócsy, the surviving element of Tacitus' account is that the Osi, Cotini and Eravisci formed a single Celtic group in the northern Carpathian region.

== Geography ==
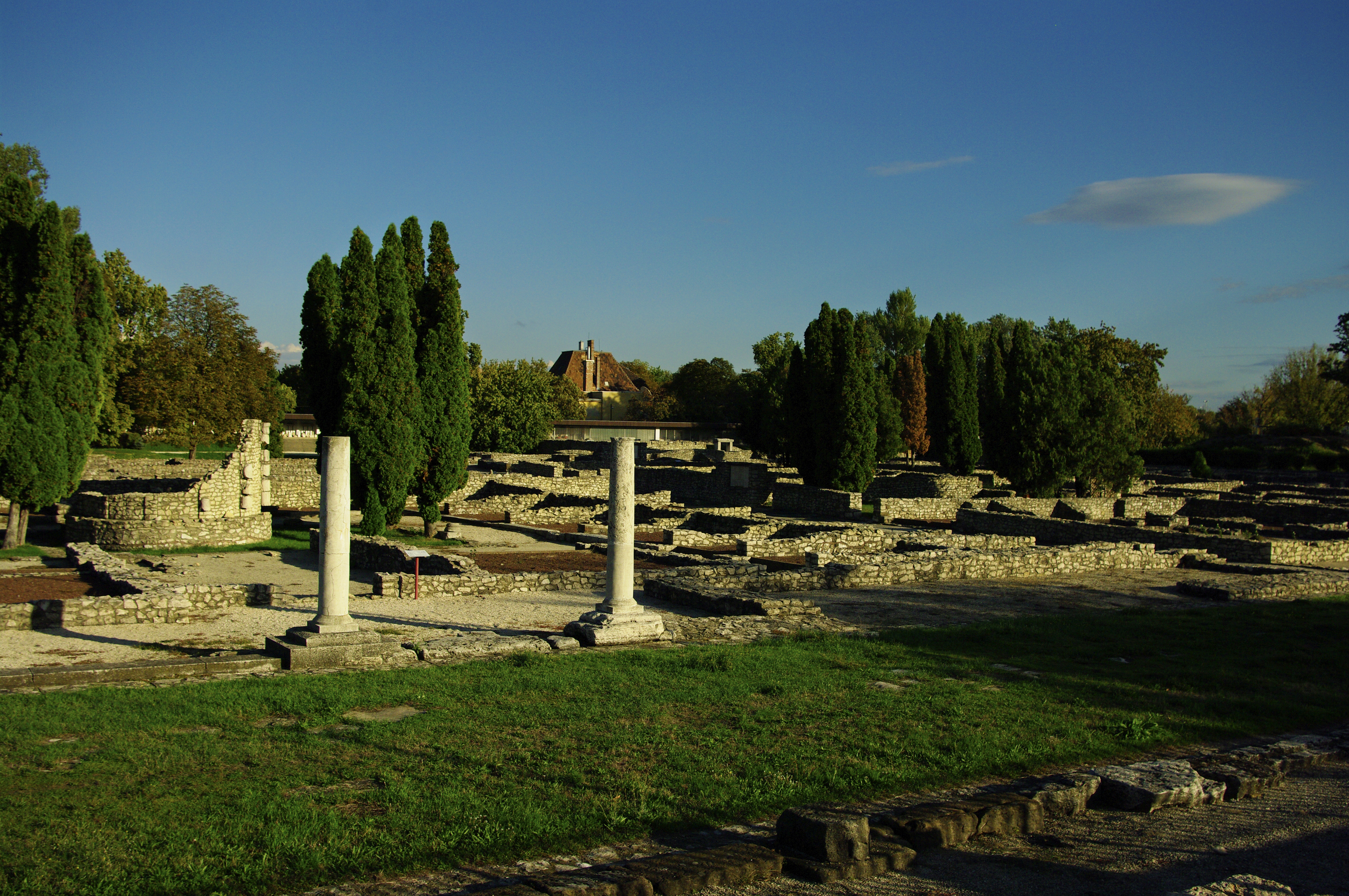
Ruins of Aquincum

The Eravisci occupied north-eastern Pannonia, on the right bank of the Danube around the later town of Aquincum and the hills of modern Budapest. Their pre-Roman centre was the La Tène oppidum on Gellért Hill. After the Boian power in the region had been broken by the Dacians, the former Boian lands were held by the Boii, the Azali, the Eravisci, the Arabiates and the Hercuniates. Ptolemy places the Aravisci in Pannonia Inferior, east of the Azali, the two being divided by the provincial boundary between Pannonia Superior and Inferior, which ran from the bend of the Danube to Lake Balaton, though he appears to have confused them with the Amantini. To the south lay the Hercuniates, and the civitas Eraviscorum may have extended south of the Sió, on the evidence of a princeps attested at Bonyhád.

== History ==
=== Origins and pre-Roman period ===
North-eastern Pannonia had been Celticised from the 4th century BC, and substantial Celtic settlement along the Danube is attested by finds of the La Tène B and C periods. The archaeological material of the Eravisci closely resembles that of the Boii, consistent with the Norican and Boian character of their personal names.

=== Roman conquest ===
There is no record of military action against the Celtic tribes north of the Drava, and the Roman occupation of this region was probably secured by treaty rather than by force. The Eravisci minted their own coinage during the period of the conquest. This fact, together with the Roman citizenship granted to some of their leaders and the late date at which their men were recruited into the army, has been taken to indicate that they entered into a foedus (bound by treaty to Rome) rather than being annexed outright. Citizenship was granted to certain of their chiefs, as attested by inscriptions. Their coinage remained in circulation down to the reign of Caligula, and the recruitment of Eravisci into the Pannonian auxilia is documented only from the Flavian period.

=== The civitas Eraviscorum ===
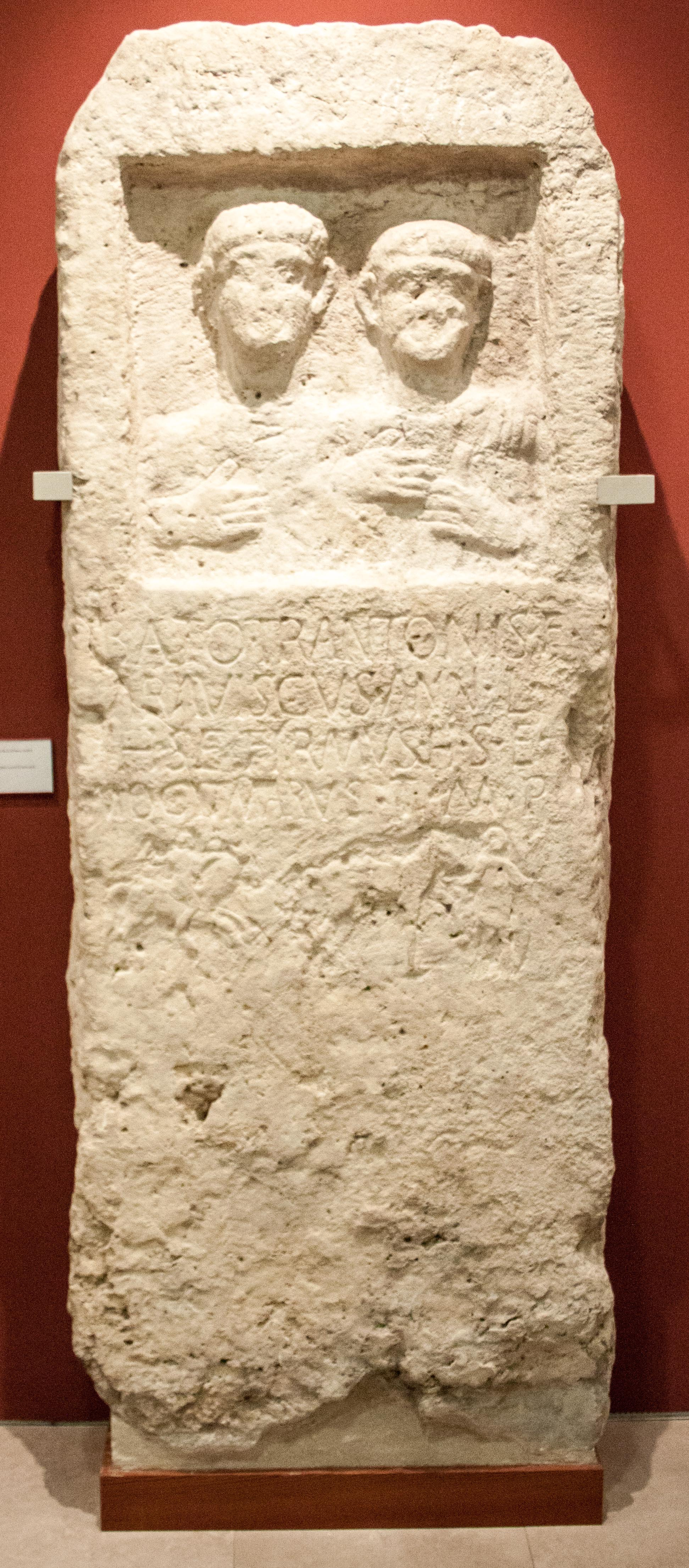
Tombstone of two Eravisci who served in the Roman cavalry, 2nd century AD (CIL III 3325)

Under Roman rule the people formed a peregrine civitas, the civitas Eraviscorum. In the 1st century it was led by principes, among them Florus, son of Matumarus, who were called decuriones under Trajan. By the time of Hadrian only a tabularius and a single holder of an otherwise unattested office are recorded, which points to a change in the status of the community. Several of its leaders received Roman citizenship under Hadrian and went on to sit as decuriones of the municipium Aelium Aquincum.

Aquincum was raised to the rank of municipium under Hadrian, and with its foundation the civitas Eraviscorum ceased to exist as an autonomous body. It was never formally abolished, however, and survived as a territorial and cultic community into the 3rd century, in a relationship to the municipium resembling attributio. At Aquincum the municipium, the civitas and the army each held a separate territory, that of the civitas lying to the south and south-west. Not all of its members obtained citizenship, and many remained peregrine Eravisci, living in the territory as incolae and serving in the auxilia, with military diplomas issued to Eraviscan veterans down to 167.

The later character of the civitas has been explained in different ways. András Mócsy took it for an attributio to the municipal territory. Jenő Fitz held that its territory had been divided, the northern part passing to the municipium while the civitas survived in the south, and elsewhere suggested that it endured only as a cult community. Endre Tóth identified the civitas with Aquincum itself, while Péter Kovács proposed instead that its name had simply become that of the former tribal centre south of Aquincum, near the oppidum on Gellért Hill.

== Coinage ==
Under Augustus the Eravisci minted their own silver coinage on the Roman denarius standard, imitating Republican denarii of about 90–70 BC. The legends are sometimes abbreviated personal names, such as DOMISA, ANSA and DVTEVTA, but most often render the tribal name in forms such as RAVIZ or IRAVSCI. The coins were probably struck at Aquincum, and their distribution is concentrated within a narrow radius of Budapest, with only a few examples reaching Gaul and free Dacia. Hoards of these coins contain Augustan denarii, one of them a Caligulan denarius, which places the issue in the period of the Roman conquest and its circulation down to the reign of Caligula. That a people inside the imperial frontier was permitted to coin on the Roman standard under its own name is taken as evidence of a treaty relationship with Rome.

== Society and material culture ==
The native aristocracy adopted lavish wagon-burials in the first half of the 2nd century, the dead being interred with a four-wheeled wagon, horses and Roman luxury goods. The wagon-grave at Sárszentmiklós, which contained a bronze lance-shaped badge (hasta) of the kind reserved for holders of executive office, is taken to be that of one of the highest functionaries of the civitas Eraviscorum. Native dress and Celtic names persisted in north-eastern Pannonia far longer than among the neighbouring Boii, in large numbers down to the Marcomannic Wars. Iron Age traditions also continued in the local pottery of the 2nd century, notably the so-called grey ware of Pátka.

The cult most closely associated with the civitas is that of Iuppiter Optimus Maximus Teutanus, a Romano-Celtic form of Jupiter worshipped at Aquincum and at Bölcske. A series of altars was set up to him on 11 June pro salute of the civitas Eraviscorum, a practice that continued into the late 3rd century, one of them recording that it was erected in finibus Eraviscorum.
