= Boii (Pannonia) =

Celtic people of ancient Pannonia

The Boii were a Celtic people of the middle Danube and the Carpathian Basin, dominant in the region during the La Tène period before the Roman conquest. Their power extended over the northern part of the basin until they were defeated, in alliance with the Taurisci, by the Dacian king Burebista around the middle of the 1st century BC. The land they had held became known to Greek and Latin writers as the deserta Boiorum ('wastelands of the Boii'). The people nonetheless survived the Dacian victory and the Roman occupation. The Romans organised their territory south of the Danube as a civitas Boiorum in Pannonia.

== Name ==
The Danubian Boii are named by Strabo, who places their seats next to the Raeti and the Vindelici and records both their migration to the Danube and their defeat by the Dacians, by Pliny, who calls their land the deserta Boiorum, and by Ptolemy, who lists the Βόιοι in Pannonia between the Azali and the Colapiani. Caesar records Boii who had moved into the territory of the Norici and attacked Noreia. The name also appears in Latin inscriptions of the Roman period, as a tribal designation, civitas Boiorum, and as a statement of origin, natione Boius.

The etymology of Boii is unsettled. Xavier Delamarre records several competing derivations. One reading takes the name from an earlier bogios, giving a sense 'striker', which Delamarre regards as improbable on chronological grounds. A related proposition derives it from a root *bʰei(ə)- ('to strike'), and compares the runic baijaz ('warrior'), which would yield a sense 'the warriors'. A third connects it with a root *bʰei- ('to fear'), and interprets Boios as 'the fearsome'. A fourth links it with the word for cattle (*gʷoyjos) in the sense 'cattle-owner', which Delamarre judges doubtful because of the loss of the internal glide. (Note: Raimund Karl derives Boii from Proto-Celtic *bouios ('one who possesses cows'), so that in a cattle-reckoned economy a *bouios was a legally competent freeman, and the name first denoted an élite class rather than a tribe.) A fifth, proposed by Alfred Bammesberger, derives the name from a root *gʷei(ə)- ('to live'), giving a sense 'lively, active'.

== Geography ==
Before the Dacian conquest the Boii controlled the northern part of the Carpathian Basin. Their seats lay mainly north of the Danube, in what is now south-western Slovakia and the adjacent parts of Lower Austria and Moravia, with the tribal centre in the area of present-day Bratislava. Strabo places their plains next to those of the Helvetii, the Raeti and the Vindelici, so that the Boii bordered the northern zone of Noricum along the Danube, a position reflected in the place-name Boiodurum (modern Passau). By the late 2nd century BC three Celtic peoples shared the Carpathian Basin: the Boii in the north, the Scordisci in the south-east and the Taurisci in the south-west. To the east the Boian sphere reached the Tisza, beyond which lay the Dacians.

The territory the Boii had occupied is called by Strabo the Voiōn erēmia ('solitude of the Boii'; Βοίων ἐρημία) and by Pliny the deserta Boiorum. The expression was long read as a wasteland left empty by the Dacian destruction. Péter Kovács argues instead that it reflects a literary topos, used since Herodotus for inhabited but uncultivated land beyond the oikoumene, and that it denotes the whole of the former Boian territory in northern Transdanubia rather than a depopulated zone. Miklós Szabó likewise takes the term as a geographical name evoking the flat, marshy character of north-western Transdanubia. Wolfgang David takes the expression to cover a wider zone running along the Danube from the Lech in southern Germany to the north-western Carpathian Basin, rather than a single region within it.

== History ==
=== Origins ===
The origin of the Danubian Boii is disputed. Strabo reports that the Cisalpine Boii whom Rome expelled from Northern Italy after their subjection in 191 BC migrated to the Danube, where they settled alongside the Taurisci, and he identifies these Danubian Boii with the Italian ones. No other ancient source confirms the migration directly, although Polybius and Pliny record the disappearance of the Boii from Italy.

Modern scholarship has debated this migration account. András Mócsy found that the La Tène material of the middle Danube shows no close link either with finds in Bohemia or with those of northern Italy, and inferred a gradual Celticisation of the whole northern Carpathian region between the 4th and 2nd centuries BC, beginning with the first Celtic invasion and requiring no further immigration from the west. Gerhard Dobesch, who likewise rejected Strabo's account as an inference drawn from the mere identity of the name, derived the Danubian Boii instead from the Bohemian Boii. Szabó, who rejects the identification of Boiohaemum with Bohemia, stresses elements of Italian origin in the La Tène material of the middle Danube and argues for a Boian presence in the Carpathian Basin, under no recorded name, from the 4th century BC. On this view the form Tolisto-boii, a variant of the name of the Galatian Tolistobogii, may preserve the memory of a Boian contingent in the Celtic expansion of 280 BC. Kovács, reviewing the literary evidence, holds it more probable that the Boii reached the Danube from the north than from Italy. David also argues against a single mass migration. In his view, the expulsion of 190 BC triggered a movement spread over time, in which groups long exposed to Mediterranean civilisation settled among the existing population over a wide area, and there formed the ruling and identity-giving nucleus of the Danubian Boii.

=== Boian-Tauriscan alliance ===
The earliest securely dated event involving the Danubian Boii is their repulse of the Cimbri, which Posidonius, quoted by Strabo, sets in the Hercynian Forest around 120–113 BC.

By the early 1st century BC the Boii, allied with the Taurisci under the king Critasirus, dominated the northern Carpathian Basin as far as the Tisza. Around the middle of the 1st century BC the Dacian king Burebista defeated the Boian-Tauriscan alliance. Strabo writes that he destroyed the Boii and the Taurisci under Critasirus utterly, the disputed land being the country beyond a river he names the Parisus. The river-name is corrupt: it has been emended to the Pathisus (Tisza) or to the Marisus (Maros). The former being the more probable since the Tisza marked the boundary between the Boian and Dacian spheres. The date of the defeat is uncertain. Szabó places it before the end of the 60s BC, whereas the prevailing view dates it to the second half of the 40s BC. David, stressing the uncertainty, allows a span between about 85 and 45 BC. Critasirus is also attested on a Boian coin legend. Strabo repeats the destruction of the Boii several times, but the language of total extinction is a commonplace, and the people in fact survived, as the parallel of the Cotini shows. The destruction of the oppidum at Bratislava around the middle of the 1st century BC may have been a consequence of the Dacian victory.

A Boian force besieged Noreia in 60 or 59 BC. Szabó connects this with the Dacian defeat, the Boii in question having been driven from their seats, and notes that the contingent eventually reached Gaul, where it settled among the Aedui. Kovács, dating the Dacian victory later, holds that the Boii who attacked Noreia came from the north. Caesar's wording leaves both the date of the siege and the origin of these Boii open. (Note: The point turns on Caesar's text. The transmitted oppugnarant (perfect) implies that the siege was already over, whereas the emendation oppugnabant (imperfect) would make the Boii still besieging Noreia when the Helvetii took them in. The verb transire means here simply 'to move', not necessarily 'to cross the Danube', so it does not fix where these Boii came from.)

=== Roman conquest ===
After the collapse of Boian power the region passed gradually under Roman control. Strabo already treats the land of the Boii as part of Illyricum, with the Danube as its northern border, and Pliny's deserta as bordering Noricum and Pannonia without belonging to either, a situation matching the reign of Augustus. No ancient source records resistance by the Boii or by the other Celtic peoples of northern Pannonia, and no destruction layers of the conquest have been found at their sites, which has been taken to imply a negotiated submission, perhaps under a foedus. The land was annexed under Augustus, when the frontier reached the Danube, although the province of Pannonia was probably not organised until the reign of Tiberius. The Boian territory north of the Danube was evacuated under Augustus, probably in 6 AD and at the latest by 19 AD, by which date the kingdom of Vannius had been established. The move is associated with Tiberius's planned campaign against Maroboduus, for which a winter camp was prepared at Carnuntum. The central oppidum at Bratislava appears to have been abandoned peacefully.

The Romans organised the land of the Boii south of the Danube as a civitas Boiorum. It was at first placed under a military prefect: an inscription records Lucius Volcacius Primus as praefectus ripae Danuvii et civitatium duarum Boiorum et Azaliorum, prefect of the Danube bank and of the two civitates of the Boii and the Azali. Later the community was governed by its own Romanised elite, the principes, who had received Roman citizenship. Its members set up gravestones giving the origin of the deceased as Boius, all of them earlier than the reign of Hadrian.

Following Mócsy, it has generally been held that the territorium of the new Roman towns of Savaria, Scarbantia, Carnuntum, Mursella and Vindobona was carved out of the former tribal land, and that the civitas had ceased to exist by Hadrian's time. Kovács argues instead that the remnant of the civitas, in the area of Vindobona, survived until the reign of Septimius Severus, when Vindobona was probably raised to municipal rank. On this reading the survival of the tribal name accounts for the description natione Boius on the grave of an eques singularis at Rome, dated to the early 3rd century.

== Settlement and material culture ==
The principal centre of the Pannonian Boii was the oppidum on the site of Bratislava, with an associated settlement at Devín. Its finds show close links with northern Italy, among them a town gate built in masonry, a technique that presupposes experience drawn from Cisalpine Gaul. The Boii struck a silver coinage, the Biatec type, probably at Bratislava, strongly influenced by Roman practice and bearing legends in Latin characters. One issue, inscribed Maccius, shows a beast of prey holding two human legs in its jaws, a motif of Etrusco-Italic origin.

A group of plastic-decorated La Tène pottery of the middle Danube, including the so-called Danubian kantharoi, shows a similar Italian filiation. It has been taken to reflect long-standing contacts between the Cisalpine and Danubian Celts rather than a single migration. A Roman aes grave of 235–220 BC found in a Celtic settlement at Nitra points in the same direction. A graffito reading Boius on a vessel from Manching has no bearing on the tribe, since it may be no more than a personal name.
