= Belgites =

Ancient people of Pannonia

The Belgites were an ancient people of Pannonia, in the region of the middle Danube. They are recorded only by Pliny the Elder, who lists them among the inland peoples of the province. Their location is uncertain, and they have been placed only tentatively in the north-west of Pannonia. Their name is usually taken to be Celtic.

== Name ==
The Belgites are named only by Pliny the Elder, who lists them among the inland peoples of Pannonia. The name is also transmitted in the variant form Uelgites.

The ethnonym is often analysed as Celtic and derived from a stem *belgo-, itself from PIE *bʰelǵʰ- ('to swell'). From this stem, Celtic derives *belg- ('bag, belly'), whence, metaphorically, 'swollen, puffed up (with anger)'. The same stem is supposed to underlie the name Belgae, itself glossed as 'the proud/wrathful people'.

== Geography ==
The Belgites cannot be securely located. András Mócsy considered that they could not be located at all, whereas Péter Kovács situates them in north-western Pannonia and connects their territory with one of the Hadrianic municipia near Lake Pelso (modern Lake Balaton). (Note: Kovács's candidate sites are not fully consistent: in his discussion he names Valcum or Mogetiana, while in his table of the Pannonian civitates he assigns the uncertain civitas Belgitum to Volgum and a joint civitas Belgitum / Arabiatum to Salla.) On this reconstruction they would have formed a civitas Belgitum, though the relevant epigraphic evidence is uncertain.

In Pliny's list the Belgites stand between the Amantini and the Catari. They are commonly associated with the Arabiates, another people attested only by Pliny and likewise placed in western Pannonia, near the river Arrabo (the modern Rába).

== History ==
As one of the indigenous peoples of Pannonia, the Belgites would have been organised into a peregrine civitas after the Roman conquest of the region. The municipalisation of the province was largely complete under Hadrian, by whose reign no peregrine civitas is thought to have survived. Kovács supposes that the civitas of the Belgites was in consequence absorbed into one of the municipia founded around Lake Pelso.
