= Critasirus =

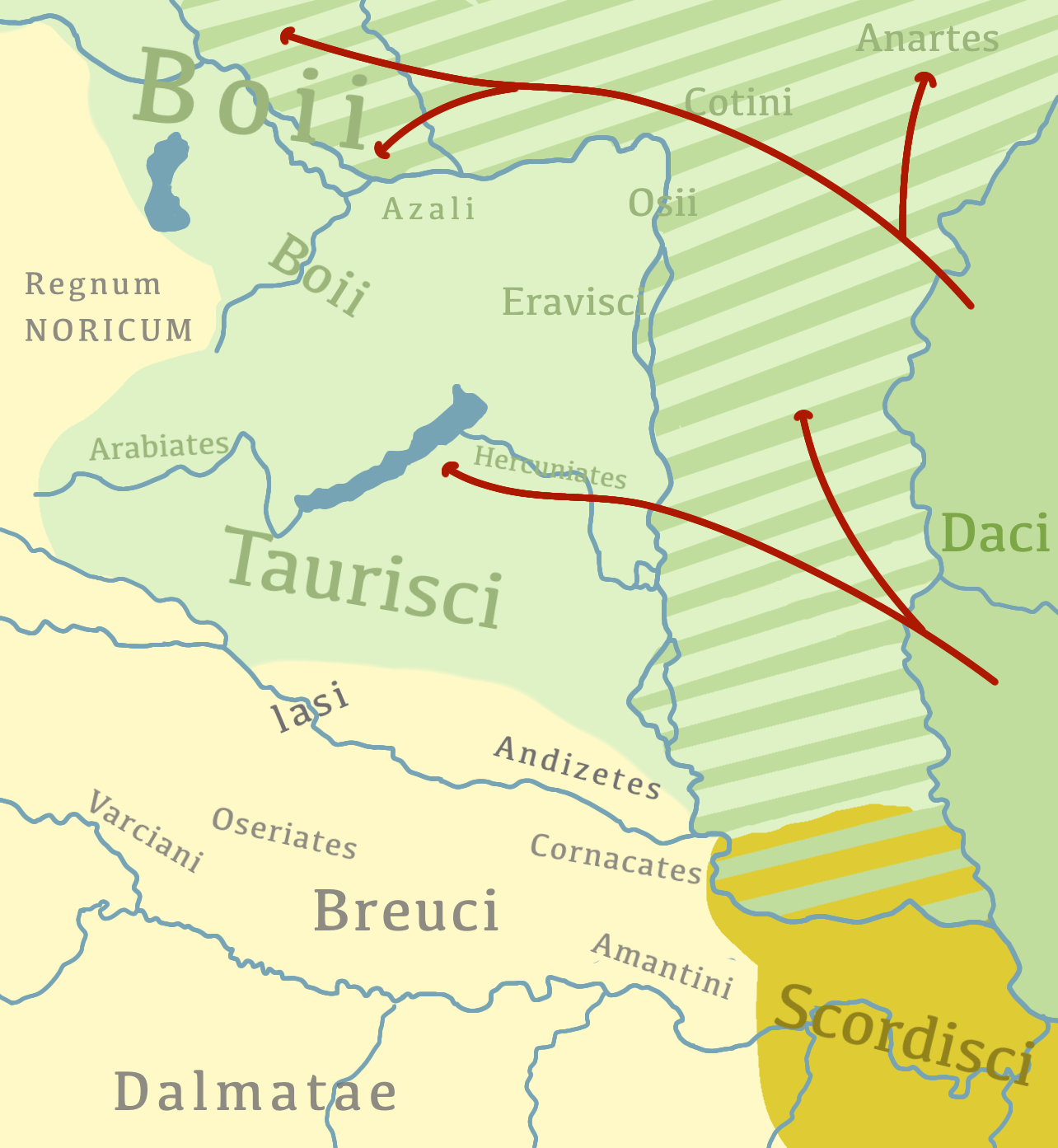
Map showing a hypothetical reconstruction of Dacian incursions into territory held by the Boii and Taurisci, ca. 61–59 BC

Critasirus or Kritasiros (Ancient Greek: Κριτασίρος) was a king of the Boii and Taurisci — Celtic-speaking tribes inhabiting parts of what is today Hungary, Slovakia, and Czechia — during the 1st century BC. Strabo, the ancient source for this figure (Geographica 7.3.11, 7.5.2), says that Critasirus's people were invaded by Dacians under Burebista. Their holdings were ravaged and their land seized, and they were driven into exile.

== Name ==
The name Kritasiros as preserved in Greek by Strabo is compounded from straightforwardly Celtic elements: crito-, "terror, [the cause of] trembling," and siros, "long," a name found uncompounded as Siros; hence "Longue-Terreur" ("Long-lasting Terror"). However, sir- might also be interpreted as the element stir-, sir-, đir-, "star," as found in the deity name Sirona, in which case the name would mean something like "Twinkling Star", perhaps in connection to a priestly role in astral divination. This variation is found also in the related name Escritusiros.

== King of the Boii ==
Several branches of the Boii, whether the name represents a cohesive ethnic group or was merely a common tribal designation, are known over a wide geographical area ranging from southwest Gaul to Anatolia. In the 4th–3rd centuries BC, Boii were among the Celts who migrated into the Balkans, with some continuing into central and eastern Anatolia where they established Galatia and maintained a significant presence into the Christian era. Boii who had crossed into Cisalpine Gaul during this period were major adversaries to the early Roman Republic, and while many integrated over time into the Roman sphere of North Italy, other Boii consolidated their independent identity in Danubia. At the end of the 2nd century BC, the western half of the Carpathian basin was firmly under the control of Boii, and their power was at its zenith when Critasirus reigned over them in the first half of the 1st century BC.

The authority of Critasirus was recognized also by a branch of the Taurisci from the northeast, whom Alföldy regarded as distinct from the Taurisci of Noricum. His rule thus extended over what was "probably a very large country" encompassing the Boii in what became northern Pannonia, the Taurisci in what became southwest Pannonia, and other Celtic tribes inhabiting the northern edge of the Hungarian plain and present-day Slovakia. Critasirus has sometimes been thought to have ruled in Noricum as well, partly on the basis of a coin, possibly a forgery, from Mallnitzer Tauern, issued with the name Escritusirus rex.

Around 60 BC, these Boii were displaced when the Dacians under Burebista occupied the northwestern plain of the Carpathian basin and the Danube-Tisza plain, though the evidence for dating the war between them is circumstantial. Dacian control of the greater area was imposed swiftly but was short-lived, collapsing ca. 45/44 BC, around the time of Burebista's death, when Noricum extended its influence. Alföldy regards Critasirus as the major obstacle to Norican expansion prior to the Dacian takeover. Around the turn of the 1st/2nd centuries AD, Strabo says that "neighbouring peoples" had taken over most of the vacated Boian lands, which Pliny the Elder still referred to as a "Boian desert" in Pannonia ca. AD 77. The anarchic multiplicity of Pannonian tribes during the time of Augustus left them unable to mount a resistance to Roman imperialism under a centralized power such as Critasirus or Burebista had organized and commanded.

== Siege of Noreia and the Gallic Wars ==
According to Julius Caesar's account of the Gallic Wars, in 60 BC, the year before his consulship, 32,000 Boii laid siege to Noreia, a stronghold of the kingdom of Noricum. The timing of "this much debated piece of information," as characterized by Alföldy, suggests that the venture was launched by Boii displaced by Burebista. Although the exact location of Noreia remains uncertain, there is archaeological evidence of a siege around this time at a Celtic stronghold (oppidum) at Magdalensberg.

Whatever the intentions of the Boii, they failed and were repelled by an alliance between the Norican king Voccio and the Suebian king Ariovistus. The Boii who survived this conflict then joined the Helvetii, from present-day Switzerland, in their planned migration through southern and central Gaul. In response to the Helvetian-Boian advance, the Celtic Aedui, whose eastern border stretched along the Saone river, invoked their treaty protections as long-time allies of Rome and called on the new proconsul of 58 BC to aid in their defense, providing Caesar with a casus belli to cross out of his southern Gallic province into free Gaul.

After the Battle of Bibracte, this branch of the Boii were placed under the jurisdiction of the Aedui, who gave them land to resettle along their southwestern border with the Arverni. The Boii there founded Gorgobina, a critical site in the Gallic Wars. Critasirus, however, is not named by Caesar or any ancient source other than Strabo, and it is not known whether he survived the initial irruption of the Dacians to participate in any of these subsequent events. (Note: The transplanted Boii of Gorgobina leave scant traces in the historical record after the Gallic Wars. At least two inscriptions appear to assert a Boian identity, and Tacitus reports a Boian uprising against the Aedui about a hundred years after the Gallic Wars.)

== Bibliography ==
- Alföldy, Géza (1974). Noricum. Routledge Revivals. Translated by Anthony Birley (2014 ed.). Taylor & Francis.
- Delamarre, Xavier (2003). Dictionnaire de la langue gauloise (2 ed.). Errance.
- Johnston, Andrew C. (2017). The Sons of Remus: Identity in Roman Gaul and Spain. Harvard University Press.
- Mócsy, András (1974). Pannonia and Upper Moesia: A History of the Middle Danube Provinces of the Roman Empire. Routledge Revivals (2014 ed.). Taylor & Francis.
- Rankin, David (1996). Celts and the Classical World. Routledge.
- Sláma, Jiří (1998). "Boiohaemum–Čechy". In Teich, Mikuláš (ed.). Bohemia in History. Cambridge University Press. pp. 23–38.
