= Hercynian Forest =

Central European forest of the Roman empire

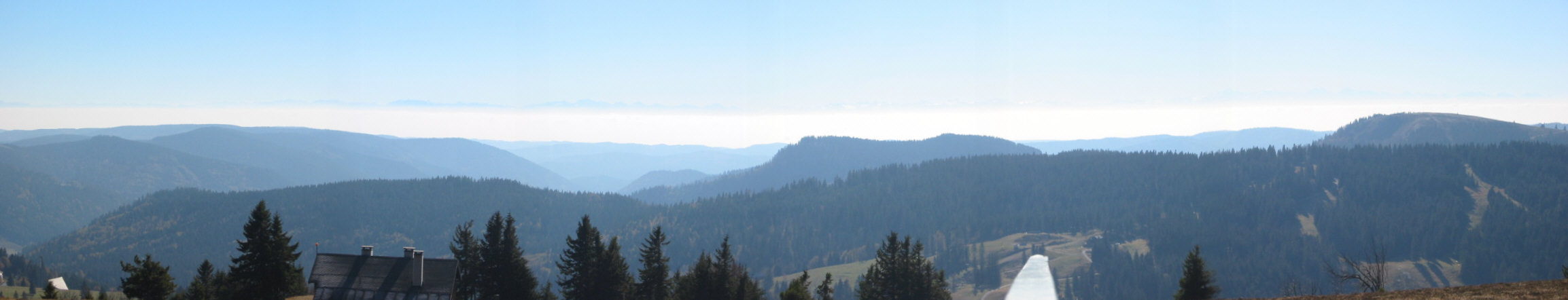
View of the Black Forest from Feldberg (2003); the forest is a very reduced relict tract of the once unbroken Hercynian Forest

The Hercynian Forest was an ancient and dense forest that stretched across Western Central Europe, from Northeastern France to the Carpathian Mountains, including most of Southern Germany, though its boundaries are a matter of debate. It formed the northern boundary of that part of Europe known to writers of Antiquity. The ancient sources are equivocal about how far east it extended. Many agree that the Black Forest, which extended east from the Rhine valley, formed the western side of the Hercynian, except, for example, Lucius of Tongeren. According to him, it included many massifs west of the Rhine.

Across the Rhine to the west extended the Silva Carbonaria, the forest of the Ardennes and the forest of the Vosges. All these old-growth forests of antiquity represented the original post-glacial temperate broadleaf forest ecosystem of Europe.

== Geography ==
Relict tracts of this once-continuous forest exist with many local names; the Black Forest, the Ardennes, the Bavarian Forest, the Vosges, the Eifel, the Jura Mountains, the Sihlwald, the Swabian Jura, the Franconian Jura, the Palatinate Forest, the Teutoburg Forest, the Argonne Forest, the Odenwald, the Spessart, the Rhön, the Thuringian Forest, the Harz, the Rauhe Alb, the Steigerwald, the Fichtel Mountains, the Ore Mountains, the Giant Mountains, the Bohemian Forest and the Sudetes. In present-day Czech Republic and southern Poland, it joined the forested Carpathians. The Mittelgebirge seem to correspond more or less to a stretch of the Hercynian mountains. Many present-day smaller forests were also included like the Bienwald and the Haguenau Forest. The Hercynian Forest may be extended northwest to the Veluwe, west to the Silva Carbonaria, southwest to the Morvan and the Langres plateau and east to the Polish Jura or even the Białowieża Forest.

== Etymology ==
Hercynian has a Proto-Celtic derivation, from ɸerkuniā, later erkunia. Julius Pokorny lists Hercynian as being derived from *perkʷu- "oak" (compare quercus). He further identifies the name as Celtic. Proto-Celtic regularly loses initial *p preceding a vowel, hence the earliest attestations in Greek as Ἀρκόνια (Aristotle, the e~a interchange common in Celtic names), later Ὀρκύνιος (Ptolemy, with the o unexplained) and Ἑρκύνιος δρυμός (Strabo). The latter form first appears in Latin as Hercynia in Julius Caesar, inheriting the aspiration and the letter y from a Greek source.

== Ancient references ==
The name is cited dozens of times in several classical authors, but most of the references are non-definitive, e.g., the Hercynian Forest is Pomponius Mela's silvis ac paludibus invia, "trackless forest and swamps" (Mela, De Chorographia, iii.29), as the author is assuming the reader would know where the forest is. The earliest reference is in Aristotle's (Meteorologica). He refers to the Arkýnia (or Orkýnios) mountains of Europe, but tells us only that, remarkably in his experience, rivers flow north from there.

During the time of Julius Caesar, the forest blocked the advance of the Roman legions into Germania. His few statements are the most definitive. In De Bello Gallico he says that the forest stretches along the Danube from the territory of the Helvetii (present-day Switzerland) to Dacia (present-day Romania). Its implied northern boundary is nine days' march, while its eastern boundary is indefinitely more than sixty days' march. The region fascinated him, even the old tales of unicorns (which may have represented reindeer). Caesar's references to elk and aurochs and of elk without joints which leaned against trees to sleep in the endless forests of Germania, were probably later interpolations in his Commentaries. Caesar's name for the forest is the one most used: Hercynia Silva.

Pliny the Elder, in Natural History, places the eastern regions of the Hercynium jugum, the "Hercynian mountain chain", in Pannonia (present-day Hungary and Croatia) and Dacia. He also gives us some dramatic description of its composition, in which the close proximity of the forest trees causes competitive struggle among them (inter se rixantes). He mentions its gigantic oaks. But even he—if the passage in question is not an interpolated marginal gloss—is subject to the legends of the gloomy forest. He mentions unusual birds, which have feathers that "shine like fires at night". Medieval bestiaries named these birds the Ercinee. The impenetrable nature of the Hercynia Silva hindered the last concerted Roman foray into the forest, by Drusus, during 12..9 BCE: Florus asserts that Drusus invisum atque inaccessum in id tempus Hercynium saltum (Hercynia saltus, the "Hercynian ravine-land") patefecit.

The isolated modern remnants of the Hercynian Forest identify its flora as a mixed one; Oscar Drude identified its Baltic elements associated with North Alpine flora, and North Atlantic species with circumpolar representatives. Similarly, Edward Gibbon noted the presence of reindeer (pseudo-Caesar's bos cervi figura) and elk (pseudo-Caesar's alces) in the forest. The wild bull which the Romans named the urus was present also, and the European bison and the now-extinct aurochs, Bos primigenius.

In the Roman sources, the Hercynian Forest was part of ethnographic Germania. It is believed that before the Boii the Hercuniates tribe inhabited the area, later migrating to Pannonia in Illyria. By the middle of the first century BC, the Hercuniates were a minor tribe that was located along a narrow band of settlement close to the Danube, on the western side of the river a little way west of modern Budapest. Their name comes from an ancient proto-Indo-European word for an oak. The tribe is referred to by Pliny and Ptolemy as a civitas peregrina, a wandering tribe that had travelled to Pannonia from foreign parts. Little else is known of them save that they were issuing their own coins by the second century BC. By AD 40 the tribe was eventually subdued by Rome.

== Medieval period ==
Monks sent out from Niederaltaich Abbey (founded in the eighth century) brought under cultivation for the first time great forested areas of Lower Bavaria as far as the territory of the present Czech Republic, and founded 120 settlements in the Bavarian Forest, as that stretch of the ancient forest came to be known. The forest is also mentioned in Hypnerotomachia Poliphili as the setting for the dream allegory of the work.

== Modern references ==
The German journal Hercynia, published by the Universities and Landesbibliothek of Sachsen-Anhalt, pertains to ecology and environmental biology.

Some geographers apply the term Hercynian Forest to the complex of mountain ranges, mountain groups, and plateaus which stretch from Westphalia across Middle Germany and along the northern borders of Austria to the Carpathians.

== See also ==
- Białowieża Forest
- Myrkviðr
- Broceliande
