= Taurisci =

Ancient Celtic people of the south-eastern Alps

The Taurisci were a Celtic people, or federation of peoples, who from about 300 BC occupied the south-eastern fringe of the Eastern Alps, in what is now Slovenia and the neighbouring regions. They are known chiefly from scattered Greek and Roman notices between the 2nd century BC and the 1st century AD and from the La Tène archaeological assemblage called the Mokronog group. Ancient writers gathered a number of smaller communities under their name, and by the time of Pliny the Elder those once called Taurisci were counted among the Norici. They are remembered in particular for the rich gold strike reported in their territory by Polybius and for their part in the alliance with the Boii that was destroyed by the Dacian king Burebista.

== Name ==
The Taurisci are named by several Greek and Latin authors. Polybius mentions them in his account of the wars in Cisalpine Gaul and, in a fragment preserved by Strabo, reports the discovery of a gold mine in their land. Strabo lists them repeatedly and calls them strictly Celtic. Livy records their involvement in the events of 171–170 BC, and Pliny the Elder sets them in relation to neighbouring peoples and notes that those formerly called Taurisci were in his day called Norici. Appian and Cassius Dio mention them in the wars of the 1st century BC, Appian being the last ancient author to name them. They also appear in the elogium of the consul Gaius Sempronius Tuditanus from Aquileia. The lexicographer Stephanus of Byzantium preserves the entry of Polybius together with a note of Eratosthenes, who wrote the name as Teriskoi and added that they were also called Tauroi.

The name also sometimes appears with the diphthong -eu-, as Teurisci in Strabo and Teuriskoi in Ptolemy. The absence of *eu in Gaulish is taken to support an original form with -au-. Zsolt Simon treats the sound change a > e as a feature of the Celtic spoken in Pannonia, parallel to the variation between Aravisci and Eravisci. A people from north-western Dacia is also named Teurisci, and is generally linked in scholarship to the Taurisci.

The etymology of Taurisci is much debated. It has long been linked to the root seen in the Tauern mountains in the Alps, and in such names as Taurinum, Taurunum and Teurnia. This would make the Taurisci the 'dwellers by the Tauern'. This connection, resting mainly on linguistic argument, has often been questioned. In another line of interpretation the name is connected with Indo-European *tauros ('bull'), in which case Taurisci would not follow the metathesized Celtic form taruos. The same element is also seen in the name of the neighbouring Taurini. By contrast, Alexander Falileyev regards the stem taur- as probably non-Celtic, which would leave the Celtic character of the name resting only on its suffix *-isk-. He regards the Taurisci as a Celtic people with a possibly hybrid name, combining a local form with a non-Celtic stem. That suffix has a wide Indo-European range, and it is found in several names long held to be Celtic, including Aravisci, Boisci, and Scordisci.

== Ethnic identity ==
Besides the Po-plain Taurisci, the same name is applied to other groups whose relationship to the Taurisci of the south-eastern Alps is unclear. In the western Alps Cato, quoted by Pliny, groups the Lepontii and Salassi among the gentes Tauriscae. On the strength of this usage, Rosanna Mollo Mezzena has argued that Taurisci was there at first a broad regional name from which distinct peoples such as the Salassi, Lepontii and Taurini later differentiated. Ancient writers disagreed over the ethnic affiliation of these western groups. Strabo classed the Taurini as Ligurian and the Lepontii as Rhaetian, Livy called the Taurini semigalli ('half-Gauls'), and Polybius appears to number the Taurini among the Celts.

In his second book, Polybius refers to Taurisci settled in the Po valley, who fought the Romans in the late 3rd century BC and were defeated at the Battle of Telamon in 225 BC together with the Gaesati, Insubres and Boii. Whether these are the same people as the Taurisci of the south-eastern Alps is not settled. J. H. C. Williams identifies these Po-plain Taurisci with the Taurini, the people who opposed Hannibal on his entry into Italy, treating the two names as variants.

== Geography ==
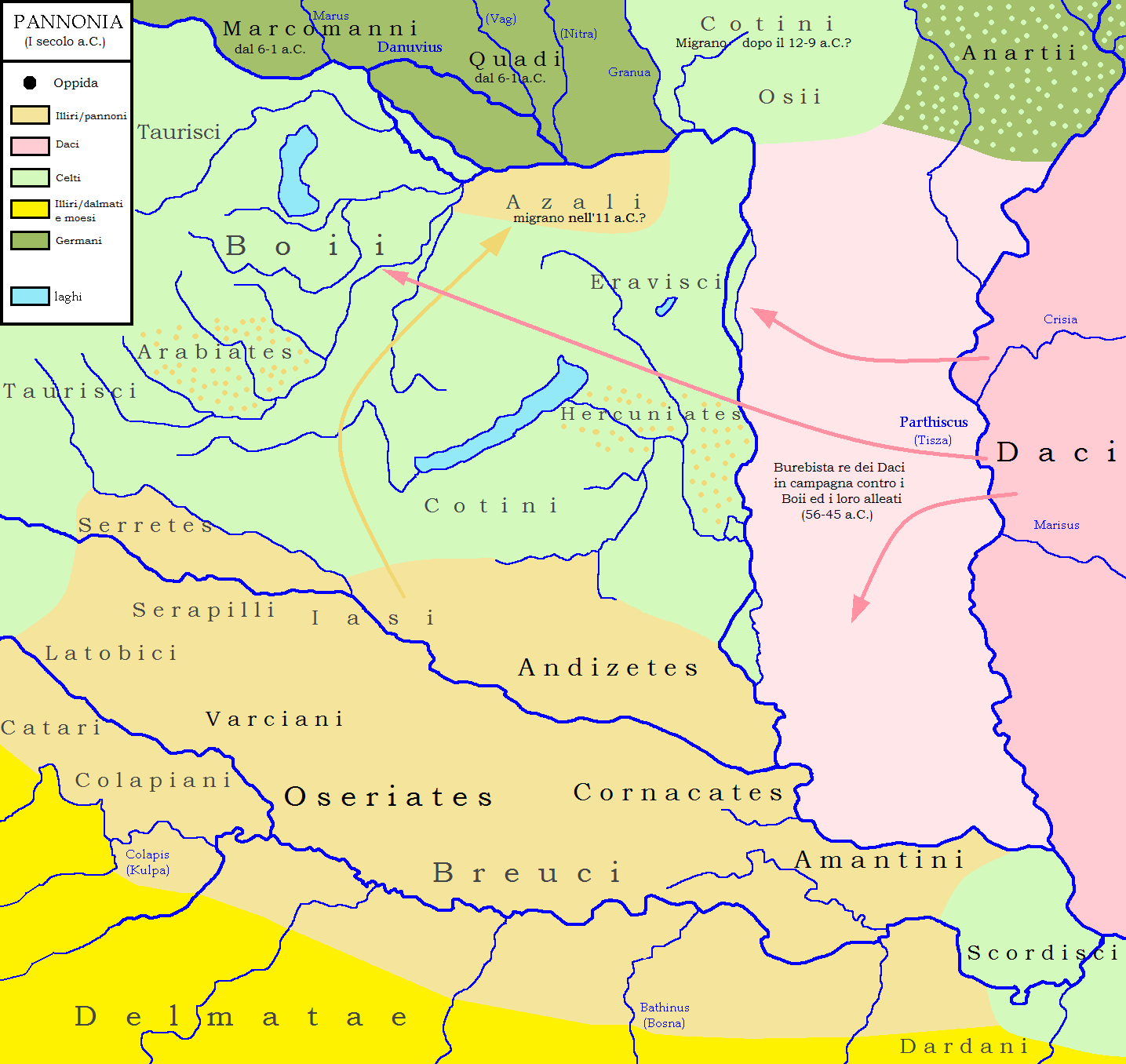
Map showing the barbarian peoples of Pannonia prior to the Roman conquest. The Taurisci are on the left

The Taurisci held the mountainous hinterland of the head of the Adriatic and the valleys of the Sava, Drava and Mura, covering most of present-day Slovenia and extending into north-western Croatia and south-western Hungary. Mitja Guštin places their 2nd- and 1st-century territory between Nauportus (Vrhnika), on the southern edge of the Ljubljana plain, and the Kolpa in the south-east, and between the Drava valley in the north-east and the Mons Claudius in the east, an extent that Ivan Radman-Livaja and Hana Ivezić give for the period before the Roman conquest. The last, named by Pliny the Elder as having the Scordisci on its near side and the Taurisci behind it, he identifies with the modern Moslovačka gora.

Their neighbours were the Carni and the Norici to the north and north-west, the Boii to the north, the Histri and the Iapodes to the south and south-west, and the Scordisci to the east.

Ancient writers describe not a single tribe but a loose alliance, the "Great Tauriscan tribal community" of modern scholarship, which never developed into a state. Among the smaller communities grouped with or under the Taurisci were the Latobici, between the Krka and the Sava; the Varciani, along the Sava towards Sisak; the Serapilli and Serretes, along the Drava on the edge of Pannonia; the Iasi, further east along the same river; the Colapiani, along the Kolpa; and the Ambisontes, Subocrini and Rundicti to the west. Ivan Radman-Livaja and Hana Ivezić hold that several of these formed part of a wider Tauriscan territory that Rome later divided into separate civitates, the Iasi in particular having long been subordinate to the Taurisci. How far any of these groups had a distinct identity before the conquest cannot be determined, and Maurizio Colombo has questioned the view that the Romans themselves created such communities. Boštjan Laharnar adds that the archaeological record is far from uniform and that the extent to which its differences reflect ethnicity is uncertain.

A recurring problem is the reference in Polybius and Strabo to (Norican Taurisci". Marjeta Šašel Kos argues that the Taurisci are never located by any ancient writer within the Norican kingdom proper, north of the Karavanke, but always south of it. The qualifier, whether added by Polybius or by Strabo, most likely distinguishes those groups that fell under Norican authority, in the Celeia and Poetovio regions, from the rest. Péter Kovács likewise separates the "Pannonian Taurisci", whose territory lay near Nauportus and Emona, from the Taurisci under Norican control. The former occupied the land of Emona, their civitas later absorbed, with Emona, into Italy.

== History ==
=== Origins ===
The Celtic settlement of the south-eastern Alps is dated to the end of the 4th and the beginning of the 3rd century BC, in the course of the great Celtic expansion into south-eastern Europe. Marjeta Šašel Kos places the conquest in the early 3rd century BC and suggests the newcomers came from western Hungary across the Pannonian plain. Venceslas Kruta likewise dates the settlement to the first half of the 3rd century BC. The incoming families absorbed the local Hallstatt-period population, which lost its earlier identity. For the earliest phase, around 300 BC, the burials are too few to support any statement about the ethnicity of the newcomers, and ancient writers apply the name Taurisci only from the 2nd and 1st centuries BC.

=== Wars with Rome ===
An early and debated notice concerns a group of Transalpine Gauls who occupied the Friuli plain in the 180s BC and were driven out by Rome shortly before the foundation of Aquileia in 181 BC. The annalist Calpurnius Piso, cited by Pliny, names them Taurisci, though Livy calls them only Transalpine Gauls. The Taurisci of the south-eastern Alps enter the record more securely in 171 BC, when the consul Gaius Cassius Longinus led an unauthorized march from Cisalpine Gaul towards Macedonia, plundering the lands of the Alpine peoples, the Taurisci among them. The following year an embassy led by the brother of the king Cincibilus, whom Livy calls a king of the Gauls and whom Marjeta Šašel Kos identifies as the Norican king, complained to the Roman senate of the damage done to the Taurisci and their neighbours, the Histri, Carni and Iapodes, and obtained compensation.

Around the middle of the 2nd century BC a rich gold deposit was found in Tauriscan territory, an event reported as recent by Polybius and preserved by Strabo. Italians worked the deposit alongside the natives for two months, the price of gold throughout Italy fell by a third, and the Taurisci then expelled the foreign workers to keep the mine to themselves. The location of the deposit is disputed. Following the long-standing identification of the find with the Norican "Tauern gold", Géza Alföldy placed it in the centre of the Norican kingdom. Marjeta Šašel Kos argues instead that, since the Taurisci are never located north of the Karavanke, the gold should be sought among the alluvial deposits of the Drava and Mura in Tauriscan territory to the south. (Note: Pliny the Elder also places a Noreia in Tauriscan territory, but the site has not been identified and its location, like the relation of the name to the Norican kingdom, remains debated.)

In 129 BC the consul Gaius Sempronius Tuditanus campaigned against the Histri, Taurisci and Iapodes, and the elogium on his statue, together with Pliny, records that he reached the river Titius. Mitja Guštin presents this campaign as a Roman retaliation for the expulsion of the Italian gold-workers, a connection that Marjeta Šašel Kos, noting that the operation was directed mainly along the coast, regards as unproven and as one of several Tauriscan hostilities towards Rome.

Further conflicts followed through the later 2nd and the 1st century BC. Marcus Aemilius Scaurus defeated the Carni and probably the Taurisci in 115 BC; around 109–100 BC the Taurisci were caught up in the Cimbrian incursions into Noricum; and in 56 BC, after Roman strongpoints had been established in northern Friuli, the Taurisci, Liburni and Iapodes were made to pay tribute to Rome. Around 50 or 41 BC the Taurisci joined the Boii under Critasiros in an alliance that was crushed by the Dacian king Burebista. Ivan Radman-Livaja and Hana Ivezić note that pressure from the Dacians and the Pannonians had already much reduced the power of both the Taurisci and the Scordisci several decades before the Roman conquest.

=== Roman conquest ===
Octavian campaigned in Illyricum in 35–33 BC. His troops reached Pannonian territory through the lands of the Iapodes and the Taurisci, and Péter Kovács describes the conquest as restricted to the Taurisci and the later Siscia area. The eastern Tauriscan groups were subdued by Octavian between 35 and 33 BC, the Taurisci offering considerable resistance, and Appian is the last ancient author to mention them. In 16 BC, during Publius Silius Nerva's campaign against the Alpine peoples, Pannonians and Norici, most likely the Taurisci, raided Istria and were defeated. The western Tauriscan groups bordering the Carni passed under the kingdom of Noricum, which Rome annexed in 16–15 BC under Drusus and Tiberius.

The Tauriscan alliance never formed a state. Pliny the Elder records that those once called Taurisci were in his day called Norici, and the Celeia and Poetovio regions, two of the principal Tauriscan centres, became part of the province of Noricum, Celeia as one of its administrative centres and Poetovio later attached to Illyricum and then Pannonia. The southern, "Pannonian" Taurisci on the territory of Emona saw their civitas dissolved and their land absorbed into Italy together with Emona. Ivan Radman-Livaja and Hana Ivezić note that any Taurisci who remained there were by then reckoned as inhabitants of Noricum, and that the name is not attested after the 1st century AD. Among the successor communities that kept an administrative identity were the Latobici, whose civitas became the municipium Flavium Latobicorum Neviodunum.

== Settlement and material culture ==
The archaeological remains attributed to the Taurisci form the Mokronog group, named by Stane Gabrovec in 1966 after the cemetery at Mokronog and assigned to the Taurisci or the Tauriscan alliance. Its phases, worked out chiefly by Mitja Guštin and Dragan Božič, run parallel to the central European La Tène sequence. The equation of the group with the Taurisci is an inference from the written sources, and Boštjan Laharnar cautions that the burials show real internal diversity whose ethnic meaning is hard to gauge.

Cremation in flat cemeteries was the usual rite during the Middle La Tène, at large burial grounds such as Novo mesto, Mokronog, Brežice and Dobova, often with ritually destroyed weapons. The earliest graves, at Srednica and Orehova vas around 300 BC, include inhumations, and inhumation reappears in the Late La Tène at Mihovo and Bela Cerkev-Strmec.

Settlement took the form of unfortified villages on the plains of the Mura, Drava, Savinja and Sava. In the Late La Tène the abandoned Early Iron Age hillforts were reoccupied and refortified, among them Cvinger above Vir pri Stični, the largest hillfort in Slovenia at nearly 20 hectares, which Boštjan Laharnar regards as an oppidum. Alongside these, agglomerated proto-urban centres developed at Ljubljana and Celeia.

The only settlement that ancient writers actually call Tauriscan is Nauportus, described by Strabo as an emporium from which goods brought from Aquileia were carried on by river. No clear trace of a pre-Roman Tauriscan port-town has yet been found there, though the river Ljubljanica has yielded numerous Late La Tène weapons interpreted as ritual deposits.

The Taurisci struck their own coinage from the middle of the 2nd century BC, the so-called Tauriscan or eastern Norican type, showing a diademed head of Apollo and a horseman with the name of a prince. The coins circulated until the time of Tiberius. Among the distinctive products of their late workshops are the iron-and-bronze helmets of the Novo mesto type, decorated with enamelled bosses and unlike western Celtic forms.
