= Boii (Bohemia) =

Celtic people of La Tène Bohemia and Moravia

The Boii (Latin: Boii, sing. Boius; Ancient Greek: Βοῖοι) were a Celtic people of the La Tène Iron Age, associated in most scholarship with Bohemia and Moravia in Central Europe. The Latin name of the region, Boiohaemum, recorded by Tacitus and surviving as the modern Bohemia, is generally read as 'the home of the Boii'. Whether a La Tène people called the Boii actually lived in Bohemia is disputed, and several scholars place the Boian homeland further southeast, toward south-western Slovakia. On the reading that locates them in Bohemia, the Boii shared in the Celtic settlement of Northern Italy around 400 BC, built a network of oppida in the 2nd and 1st centuries BC, and gave way to the Marcomanni under Maroboduus near the end of the 1st century BC, after which only the name Boiohaemum survived.

== Name ==
=== Attestations ===
The ethnonym is recorded in Greek as Βοῖοι (Boîoi) and in Latin as Boii. A singular Boios is scratched on a sherd from Manching in Bavaria, the only find of the La Tène period in central Europe that has been connected with the Boii in any way.

Several ancient authors connect the people with the Hercynian Forest and with Boiohaemum. Posidonius, quoted by Strabo, reports that the Boii formerly (πρότερον) inhabited the Hercynian Forest and beat off an incursion of the Cimbri. Caesar names Boii who had moved with the Helvetii, and in his account of the Hercynian Forest states that the Volcae Tectosages, not the Boii, then held the land around it. Velleius Paterculus places Boiohaemum, the realm of Maroboduus and the Marcomanni, within the Hercynian Forest. Tacitus is the only ancient author to connect the name Boiohaemum directly to the Boii. He sets them in the eastern part (ulteriora) of the Hercynian Forest and notes that the name outlived the change of population.

=== Etymology ===
The etymology of Boii is unsettled. Xavier Delamarre records several competing derivations. One reading takes the name from an earlier bogios, giving a sense 'striker', which Delamarre regards as improbable on chronological grounds. A related proposition derives it from a root *bʰei(ə)- ('to strike'), and compares the runic baijaz ('warrior'), which would yield a sense 'the warriors'. A third connects it with a root *bʰei- ('to fear'), and interprets Boios as 'the fearsome'. A fourth links it with the word for cattle (*gʷoyjos) in the sense 'cattle-owner', which Delamarre judges doubtful because of the loss of the internal glide. (Note: Raimund Karl derives Boii from Proto-Celtic *bouios ('one who possesses cows'), so that in a cattle-reckoned economy a *bouios was a legally competent freeman, and the name first denoted an élite class rather than a tribe.) A fifth, proposed by Alfred Bammesberger, derives the name from a root *gʷei(ə)- ('to live'), giving a sense 'lively, active'.

The compound Boiohaemum is first recorded by Strabo as Βουίαιμον (Bouiaimon) and is attested in Middle High German as Bêheim, surviving into the modern Bohemia. It is usually analysed as a Celto-Germanic hybrid, 'the home of the Boii', from Celtic Boio- and a Germanic element *haima- 'home, dwelling'. Václav Blažek instead takes the whole name as purely Celtic, reading the second element as a Celtic *saimon ('mountain ridge'), the same word he recognises in Ptolemy's Σημανοῦς Ὕλη (Latin Semanus silva). Alexander Falileyev rejects this analysis on phonological grounds, since it requires an otherwise unsupported change of *s to h.

The reading 'home of the Boii' has itself been questioned. Vladimír Salač treats Boiohaemum as a Germanic exonym, taken by the Romans from the Germani rather than from the Boii. He notes that the Germanic element haim first denoted a place of settlement, a dwelling or an estate, and that the sense 'homeland' is secondary, so that for the La Tène period a reading as the place of Boian origin is the least likely. No source names the region before the time of Maroboduus at the end of the 1st century BC. On Salač's analysis the name fixes neither the extent nor the place of origin of any homeland, and it is no evidence for a Bohemian one. Wolfgang David judges the case against reading the Tacitean Boihaemum as the starting point of a Boian migration into Italy to be the stronger one. The equation of Boiohaemum with medieval and modern Bohemia was set out by Philipp Clüver in 1616 and carried into modern research by Johann Kaspar Zeuss in 1837, and Salač holds that it later hardened into an untested assumption.

== Geography ==
The Boii are placed in the basin of Bohemia and the neighbouring parts of Moravia, within the broad and ill-defined zone that ancient authors called the Hercynian Forest. The region has been traditionally associated in scholarship with their seat from the early La Tène period onward, and the place-name Boiohaemum seen as preserving their name. The western limit is uncertain. The place-name Boiodurum (modern Passau) on the Danube has sometimes been read as a marker of Boian presence in the valley, although Falileyev derives it equally from a personal name Boius.

This localisation has been contested by some scholars. Miklós Szabó, following András Mócsy, holds that the relevant ancient evidence, chiefly Caesar's definition of the Hercynian Forest and the passages of Strabo, places Boiohaemum and the Boian homeland not in modern Bohemia but north of the Danube, toward south-western Slovakia, with a possible extension into eastern Austria and Moravia.

== History ==
=== Early La Tène period ===
Bohemia is traditionally regarded in scholarship as the lasting centre of Boian power. On this reading the development of settlement runs without a break from the late Hallstatt period into the early La Tène, so that the Celtic population of the region may already have called itself Boii. In the 6th and 5th centuries BC a wealthy ruling class is visible in the princely tumuli of southern Bohemia, such as those at Hradiště near Písek. The fortified site of Závist, opposite the confluence of the Berounka and the Vltava, held a cult area of the 5th century BC that was deliberately burned at the beginning of the 4th century. Drda and Rybová treat Závist as the power centre of this early period, and Bouzek reads it as the main centre of the Boian confederation before the migration into Italy. Gerhard Dobesch argues that Bohemia had been given up under Suebic pressure before the time of Caesar, since Caesar found only the Volcae Tectosages around the Hercynian Forest, and describes a great empty tract east of the Suebi that may be northern Bohemia.

The presence of La Tène Boii in Bohemia has, however, been questioned. Miklós Szabó holds that it is a modern topos that turned into a common preconception. He argues that the medieval identification of Boiohaemum with Bohemia generated the assumption that the homeland of the Boii lay in modern Bohemia, from which the hypotheses of Boian migrations to Italy and to the Carpathian Basin followed. Jan Kysela has traced how the perception of the Boii shifted in Bohemian scholarship over the centuries and was sometimes influenced by nationalist views. Following the Bavarian interpretation of the sources, 16th-century Czechs writers saw the Boii as 'German tribe' fighting the hero Maroboduus, while they were later described as "our Celts" by František Palacký (1798–1876) during the Czech National Revival.

=== Migration into Italy ===
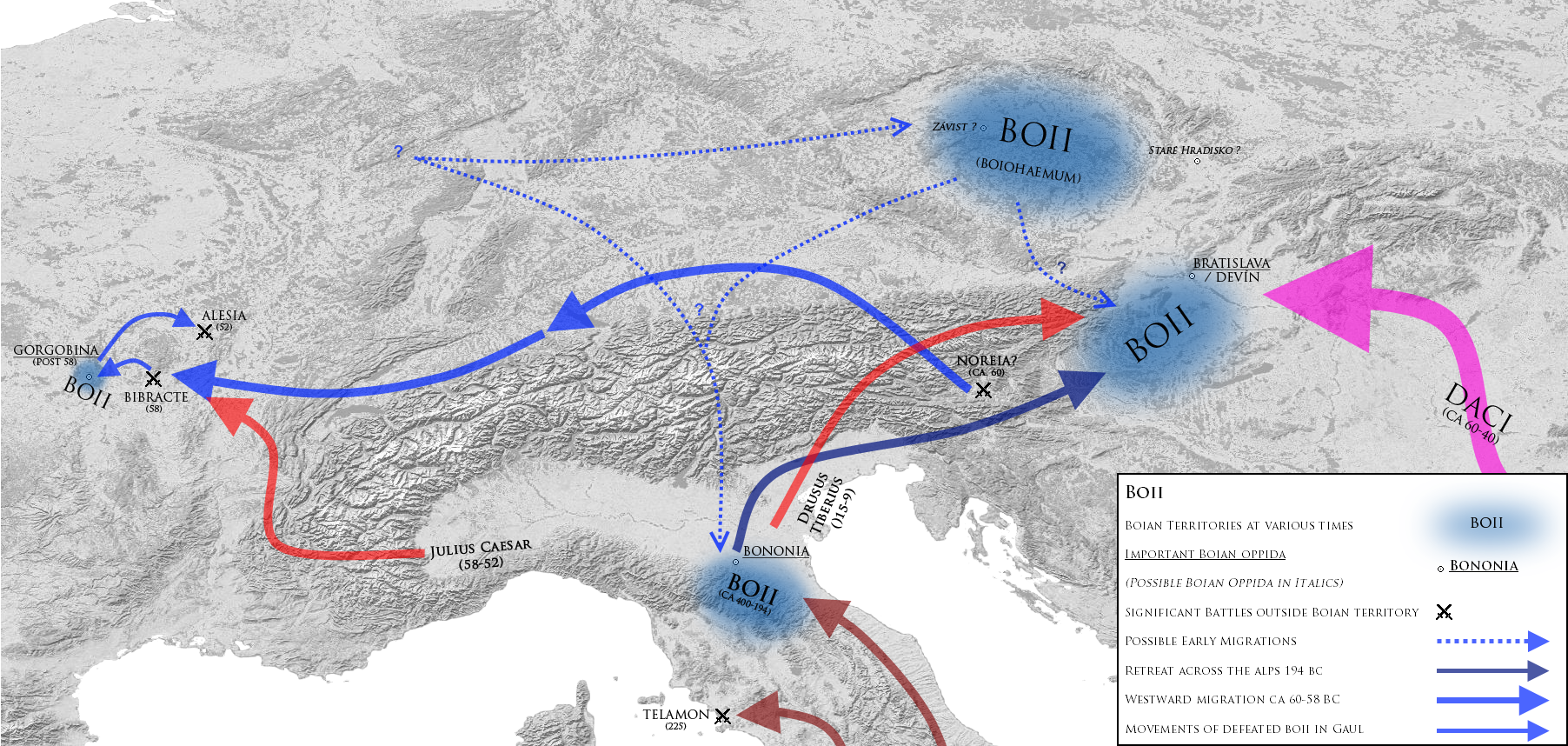
Roman accounts of the movements of the Boii

Around 400 BC Celtic groups, among them the Boii on the Czech reading, crossed the Alps into Italy and settled around Bologna, north of the Po. Strabo reports that the Boii later expelled from Cisalpine Gaul moved to the Danube, lived alongside the Taurisci, and warred on the Dacians until the people was destroyed. Whether the Italian migration is historical is disputed. Gerhard Dobesch rejects it, noting that the fully preserved Livy is silent on any such departure and that the loss of territory did not force a Celtic people to leave. Wolfgang David instead reads Strabo's notice as the earliest, if indirect, evidence for Boii on the Danube, and ties it to the Roman expulsion of the Boii from Italy in 190 BC.

The model of a single dated invasion has been questioned. David holds that the Cispadane Boii were not one group that crossed the Alps, but the outcome of repeated infiltration of mixed contingents over several decades, whose shared identity took shape only in Cisalpine Gaul. J. H. C. Williams argues that the ancient migration narratives cannot carry the weight placed on them, that an invasion must be a hypothesis to be tested rather than a premise, and that burial rite and material culture are not secure markers of ethnicity. Ralph Häussler likewise treats the arrival of the Gauls in Italy as a matter of gradual migration and infiltration over many generations rather than a single event. (Note: Daniele Vitali makes a related point for the Cisalpine evidence. He holds that the absence of La Tène material cannot disprove a presence attested in the written sources, and that the warrior burial rite was shared by Celts, Picenes and Umbrians, so that funerary practice alone does not fix ethnicity.)

=== Middle La Tène period ===
In central Europe the Middle La Tène period is marked by flat inhumation cemeteries without mounds, common in the most fertile parts of Bohemia and Moravia. Their first stage begins soon after the migration into Italy and, on Bouzek's reading, belongs to a different Celtic population from the one that had moved south. A later phase is marked by fibulae of the Duchcov type, named from the large deposit at the Giant's Spring near Duchcov. Venceslas Kruta has suggested that the population that formed after this influx gave rise to the Volcae Tectosages. The difference between the culture of the later oppida and the land to the north of them has been read as a division of Bohemia between two peoples. The settlement and craft centre at Mšecké Žehrovice, with its sapropelite bracelets and its sanctuary yielding the well-known stone head, belongs to this horizon.

=== Further migrations and the end of Boian Bohemia ===
At the turn of the 2nd and 1st centuries BC part of the Boii left Bohemia and Moravia for south-western Slovakia and western Hungary, where they formed a kingdom centred near Bratislava. Another group joined the Helvetii and left for Gaul in 58 BC. By Caesar's account these Boii had earlier settled beyond the Rhine and passed into Noricum, where they besieged Noreia, before they joined the Helvetian migration. Caesar's notice is the only ancient text that explicitly links the central European Boii to Gaul. After the defeat of the Helvetii the Boii were settled among the Aedui. They formed a small and poor community, as Caesar's figures and his reference to their tenuitas both show.

The end of the Boii in Bohemia is bound up with the localisation dispute. Gerhard Dobesch reads the homeland as given up before Caesar, under Suebic pressure, so that Caesar already found only the Volcae Tectosages there. Conversely, Bouzek has the oppida of southern Bohemia continue late into the 1st century BC. Kruta dates the occupation of Boiohaemum by the Marcomanni of Maroboduus to about 9 BC, which on this reading ended all Celtic power in the country. Whether the Tacitean pulsis olim Boiis refers to this Marcomannic conquest or to the earlier withdrawal under Suebic pressure is itself disputed. Vladimír Salač questions the Tacitean notice altogether. He observes that neither Strabo nor Velleius Paterculus, both contemporaries of Maroboduus, records any fighting with Boii, that Strabo has Maroboduus settle his Marcomanni in the land of the Germanic Quadi, and that the archaeological record shows Bohemia already held by Germanic groups from about the middle of the 1st century BC. Salač nonetheless locates Boiohaemum in the Bohemian basin, against the view of Miklós Szabó and others that placed it near Bratislava at the confluence of the Morava and the Danube.

== Settlement and material culture ==
From the second quarter of the 2nd century BC the first oppida were founded in Bohemia and Moravia, at the same time as their rise in Gaul and southern Germany. According to Bouzek, the re-foundation of Závist arose on the initiative of Boii who came from Cisalpine Gaul, where the victorious Romans had stopped them from remaining a free people, and was bound up with the memory attaching to the old site. The principal Bohemian oppida were Závist, Stradonice, Hrazany, Nevězice and Třísov, with České Lhotice guarding the route through the Iron Mountains. In Moravia the largest was Staré Hradisko near Prostějov, with the smaller Hostýn.

The oppida share the timber-laced stone rampart with vertical posts, the type later termed Pfostenschlitzmauer, and plain-faced walls resembling the murus gallicus of Gaul also occur. About half the known gates are of the inturned Zangentor form that allows a flanking defence, and tower gates are known from the largest sites, Závist, Stradonice and Staré Hradisko. In a final phase, in the 1st century BC, the stone-and-earth walls of several sites were rebuilt as multiple earthen ramparts. Alžběta Danielisová notes that this multiplication of lines is limited to a central European zone covering Bohemia, Moravia and Slovakia, and has been read as marking out a hypothetical Boian territory north of the middle Danube.

The economy of the Bohemian oppida rested on deposits of gold and graphite. Amber working is recorded at several sites, above all Stradonice and Staré Hradisko, along an eastern branch of the Amber Road running through the Moravian Gate. In Moravia, situlae with stamped decoration on the lower rim, often of graphitic clay, are typical of the Middle La Tène and point to workshops in central Moravia. The gold coinage of the region was central to the La Tène world. The earliest issues imitated the staters of Philip and Alexander, and the later gold coinage took the form of the rainbow cups (Regenbogenschüsselchen) and shell staters. The attribution of this coinage to the Boii is conventional, and Vladimír Salač notes that it rests on the identification of Boiohaemum with Bohemia and on a circular procedure by which coins from the region are called Boian and their distribution is then used to map Boian territory.
