= Geography of Württemberg =

Württemberg, a hilly rather than a mountainous region, forms part of the South German tableland, also referred to as the Swiss Plateau. The undulating fertile terraces of Upper and Lower Swabia typify this agricultural region. Estimates of land form proportions count a quarter of the entire area as plain, less than one-third as mountainous, and nearly one-half as hill-country.

- Average elevation above sea level: 1,640 feet (500 m)
- Lowest point: Bottingen 410 feet (120 m), where the Neckar leaves Württemberg
- Highest point: the Katzenkopf 3,775 feet (1,151 m), on the Hornisgrinde, on the western border

== Orography ==
The chief mountains include the Black Forest on the west, the Swabian Alb or Rauhe Alb stretching across the middle of the area from south-west to north-east, and the Adelegg mountains in the extreme south-east, adjoining the Allgäu Alps in Bavaria. The Rauhe Alb (or Alp) slopes gradually down into the plateau on its southern side, but on the north it appears sometimes rugged and steep, its line broken by isolated projecting hills. The highest summits, the Lemberg 3,326 feet (1,014 m), the Ober-Hohenberg 3,312 feet (1,009 m) and the Plettenberg 3,293 feet (1,004 m), lie in the southwest.

To the south of the Swabian Alb the plateau of Upper Swabia stretches to Lake Constance and eastwards across the Iller into Bavaria. Between the Alb and the Black Forest in the north-west lie the fertile terraces of Lower Swabia, which continue north-eastwards into Franconia.

== Hydrography ==
About 70% of Württemberg belongs to the basin of the Rhine, and about 30% to that of the Danube. The main river, the Neckar, flows northward for 186 miles (299 km) through the area to join the Rhine, draining with its tributaries (notably the rivers Rems, Kocher and Jagst) 57% of the former state of Württemberg. The Danube flows from east to west across southern Württemberg, a distance of 65 miles (105 km), a small section of which crosses through former Hohenzollern territory. Just above Ulm the river Iller, which forms the boundary between Bavaria and Württemberg for about 35 miles (56 km), joins the Danube. The Tauber in the north-east joins the Main; the Argen and Schussen in the south flow into Lake Constance.

The lakes of Württemberg, except those in the Black Forest, all lie south of the Danube. The largest is the Federsee (2.6 km^{2}), near Bad Buchau. About one-fifth of Lake Constance forms Württemberg territory.

Mineral springs abound; most famously at the spa of Wildbad, in the Black Forest.
