= Azali (tribe) =

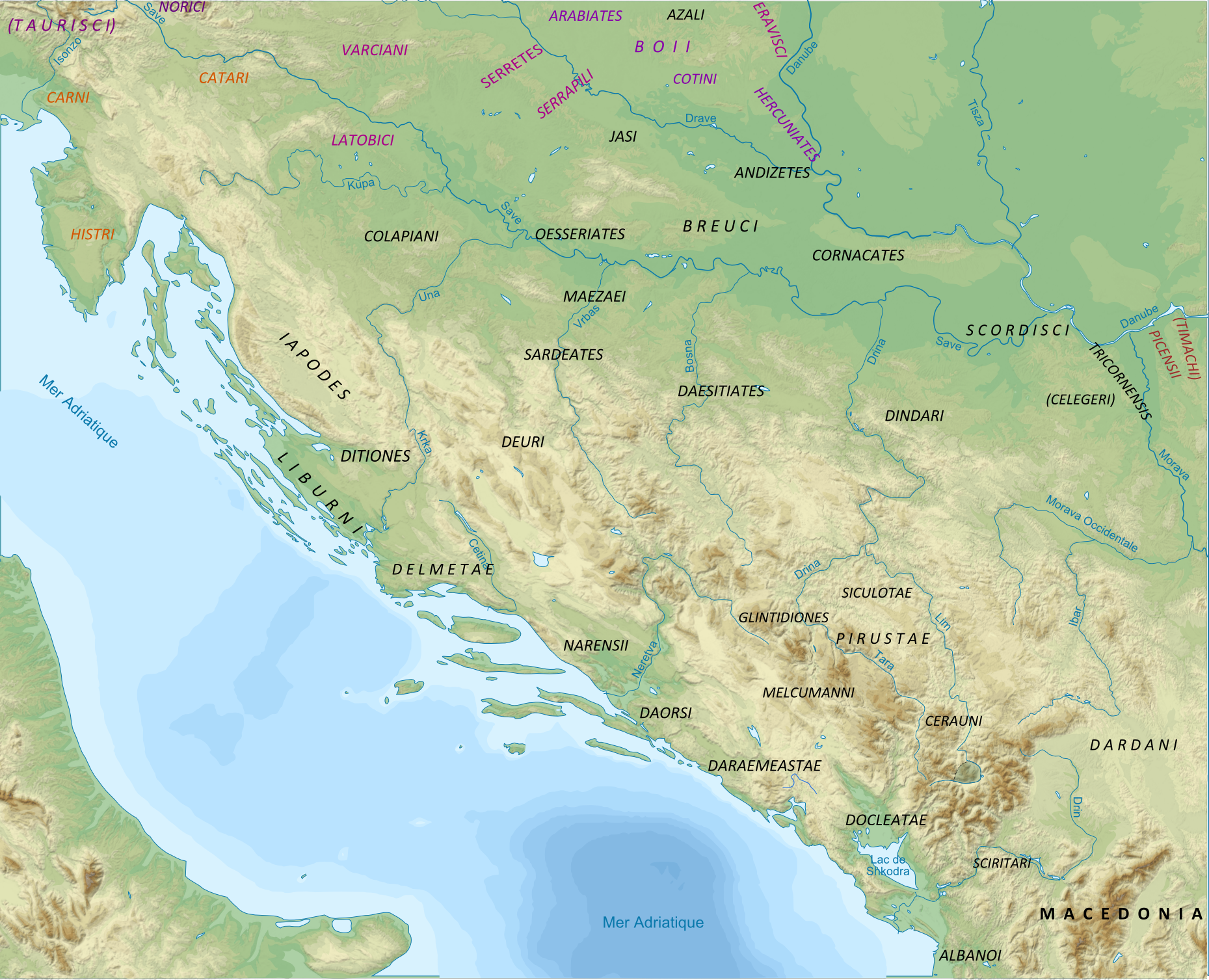
The Azali originally lived in southern Pannonia. In the Roman era, they were resettled to the northern Roman frontier in the region of Brigetio (northern Hungary)

The Azali (Ancient Greek: Ἄζαλοι) were a Pannonian Illyrian people. They originally lived in Pannonia, northern Illyria. They were one of the tribal groups which revolted in the Bellum Batonianum and like other Pannonian Illyrians, they were forcibly moved out of the region. The exact date of the resettlement is unclear as the Transdanubian area, where they were settled, passed under Roman control after the Illyrian revolt. The Azali were settled in the Roman frontier between the Celtic Boii and Eravisci. In their new homeland they were organized as a civitas (municipium Azaliorum). Their chief settlement was Brigetio, contemporary Szőny.

Azali culture is depicted on grave reliefs in Brigetion and Szomód. The Azali women who are depicted on the gravestones wore "long-sleeved dresses under an overgarment", headdresses and occasionally veils.

== Sources ==
- Dzino, Danijel (2005). Illyrian policy of Rome in the late republic and early principate (PDF) (Thesis). University of Adelaide.
- Fejfer, Jane; Moltesen, Mette; Rathje, Annette, eds. (2015). Tradition: Transmission of Culture in the Ancient World. Museum Tusculanum Press. ISBN 978-8763542586.
- Wilkes, John (1996) [1992]. The Illyrians. Wiley. ISBN 978-0-631-19807-9.
