= András Mócsy =

Hungarian ancient historian and archaeologist (1929–1987)

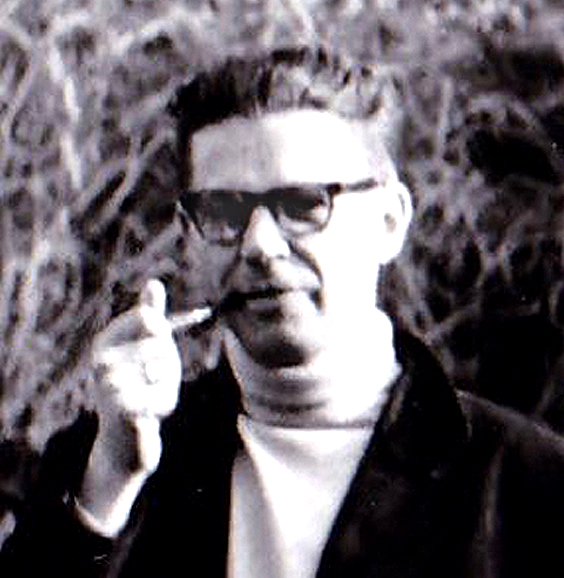
- Born: 15 May 1929; Budapest, Hungary
- Died: 20 January 1987 (aged 57); Budapest, Hungary
- Occupations: Ancient historian, archaeologist, epigrapher
- Awards: Hungarian State Prize (1983)

Academic background
- Education: Eötvös Loránd University

Academic work
- Discipline: Ancient history, classical archaeology
- Sub-discipline: Roman provincial archaeology, epigraphy, onomastics
- Institutions: Hungarian National Museum; Eötvös Loránd University
- Notable works: Pannonia and Upper Moesia (1974); Nomenclator provinciarum Europae Latinarum (1983)

András Mócsy (15 May 1929 – 20 January 1987) was a Hungarian ancient historian, archaeologist and epigrapher. A professor at Eötvös Loránd University and a member of the Hungarian Academy of Sciences, he was the foremost authority of his generation on the Roman provinces of the middle Danube, above all Pannonia and Upper Moesia, whose populations he reconstructed largely from inscriptions. In the later part of his career he created a computer-assisted and internationally organised programme for the study of Latin personal names in the European provinces, the so-called Budapest school of Roman onomastics, the foundation of which was his Nomenclator provinciarum Europae Latinarum (1983).

== Early life and education ==
Mócsy was born in Budapest on 15 May 1929. His father, János Mócsy, was a distinguished figure in Hungarian veterinary medicine whose private collection of ancient coins first drew the boy to antiquity. He attended the Piarist gymnasium in Budapest, where he gained his grounding in the classical languages, and entered university in 1947. Because his studies began only after András Alföldi had left Hungary, he was not among Alföldi's pupils. He took his diploma in archaeology in 1951.

== Career ==
On taking his degree in 1951 Mócsy joined the archaeological department of the Hungarian National Museum, where he worked as a museologist and carried out rescue excavations. In 1959 he was appointed to the department of archaeology at Eötvös Loránd University (ELTE), where he taught the archaeology of the Roman period for the rest of his life. He became an associate professor in 1962, a doctor of historical science in 1968 and a full professor in 1969. From 1974 to 1976 he served as a vice-rector of the university. He was ill-suited to the administrative role and resigned from it, and the period damaged his health. In 1977 he succeeded Gyula László as head of the department of archaeology, and in 1983 he also took over the department of ancient history.

Mócsy was elected a corresponding member of the Hungarian Academy of Sciences in 1973 and a full member in 1982. He was deputy president of the Academy's section of philosophy and history from 1976 to 1985 and its president from 1985 until his death. He was a corresponding member of the German Archaeological Institute and of the Austrian Academy of Sciences. He received the Hungarian State Prize in 1983, together with the gold medal of ELTE (1986) and the Kuzsinszky and Rómer medals for his scholarship. He edited the series Dissertationes Pannonicae and sat on the editorial boards of several journals, among them Acta Archaeologica Academiae Scientiarum Hungaricae.

Mócsy died in Budapest on 20 January 1987 after an illness of some eighteen months.

== Legacy ==
By the time of his death Mócsy was recognised internationally as the leading authority on Pannonia. His obituarist Ferenc Redő placed him in the succession of András Alföldi: although he had not been Alföldi's pupil, he was regarded as his ablest successor in the study of the province, and his choice of the "Pannonian leading role" as the theme of his 1973 academy lecture deliberately invoked Alföldi's work. The computer-assisted onomastic programme he founded, sometimes called the Budapest school, gave Hungarian scholarship a significant part in international Latin epigraphy.

== Work ==
=== Pannonia and the Danube provinces ===
Mócsy's research moved from the organisation of the military town at Aquincum to a comprehensive study of Pannonian society reconstructed from the ancient authors and from inscriptions. His first monograph, Die Bevölkerung von Pannonien bis zu den Markomannenkriegen (1959), drew conclusions about the social composition of the province from the analysis of names in inscriptions, a method some contemporaries thought controversial. It led the editors of Pauly–Wissowa's Realencyclopädie to commission his article on Pannonia (1962), which remained the standard treatment of the province for a generation. He wrote a university history of Pannonia with László Barkóczi and István Bóna (1963) and, with Barkóczi, the inscription corpus Die römischen Inschriften Ungarns (1972, 1976). In Gesellschaft und Romanisation in der römischen Provinz Moesia Superior (1970) he extended his methods to the neighbouring province and first applied a systematic statistical treatment to the name material. Alongside excavations at the late Roman fortress of Tokod and the municipium of Zalalövő (Roman Salla), he produced the English synthesis Pannonia and Upper Moesia: A History of the Middle Danube Provinces of the Roman Empire (1974).

=== Roman onomastics ===
The systematic study of Roman personal names became the central concern of Mócsy's later career, growing out of his early recognition of the name material's value as a source for social history. He dated the programme's start to his collection of the names of Upper Moesia in 1972 and presented it to the international congresses of Greek and Latin epigraphy at Paris in 1975 and 1977, drawing collaborators who sent collections and students to Budapest. The growing mass of material led him, after some hesitation, to adopt computer processing. The first result was the Nomenclator provinciarum Europae Latinarum et Galliae Cisalpinae cum indice inverso (1983), a dictionary of the Latin personal names of the European provinces giving each name's frequency and places of occurrence. On this basis he published between 1983 and 1985 a series of studies mapping the distribution of names, the fullest being A római név mint társadalomtörténeti forrás ("The Roman Name as a Source for Social History", 1985), the written version of his full-membership lecture to the Academy.

== Selected works ==
For a complete bibliography of Mócsy's writings, see Lőrincz 1989.

- Mócsy, András (1959). Die Bevölkerung von Pannonien bis zu den Markomannenkriegen (in German). Budapest.
- Mócsy, András (1962). "Pannonia". Paulys Realencyclopädie der classischen Altertumswissenschaft (in German). Vol. Supplement IX. Stuttgart. pp. 515–776.
- Barkóczi, László; Bóna, István; Mócsy, András (1963). Pannónia története (in Hungarian). Budapest.
- Mócsy, András (1970). Gesellschaft und Romanisation in der römischen Provinz Moesia Superior (in German). Budapest.
- Barkóczi, László; Mócsy, András (1972–1976). Die römischen Inschriften Ungarns (in German). Budapest.
- Mócsy, András (1974). Pannonia and Upper Moesia: A History of the Middle Danube Provinces of the Roman Empire. London and Boston: Routledge & Kegan Paul. ISBN 0-7100-7714-9.
- Mócsy, András (1983). Nomenclator provinciarum Europae Latinarum et Galliae Cisalpinae cum indice inverso. Dissertationes Pannonicae III.1 (in Latin). Budapest.
- Mócsy, András (1985). A római név mint társadalomtörténeti forrás (in Hungarian). Budapest.
- Mócsy, András (1985). Beiträge zur Namenstatistik. Dissertationes Pannonicae III.3 (in German). Budapest.
