= Watermills on Zala River =

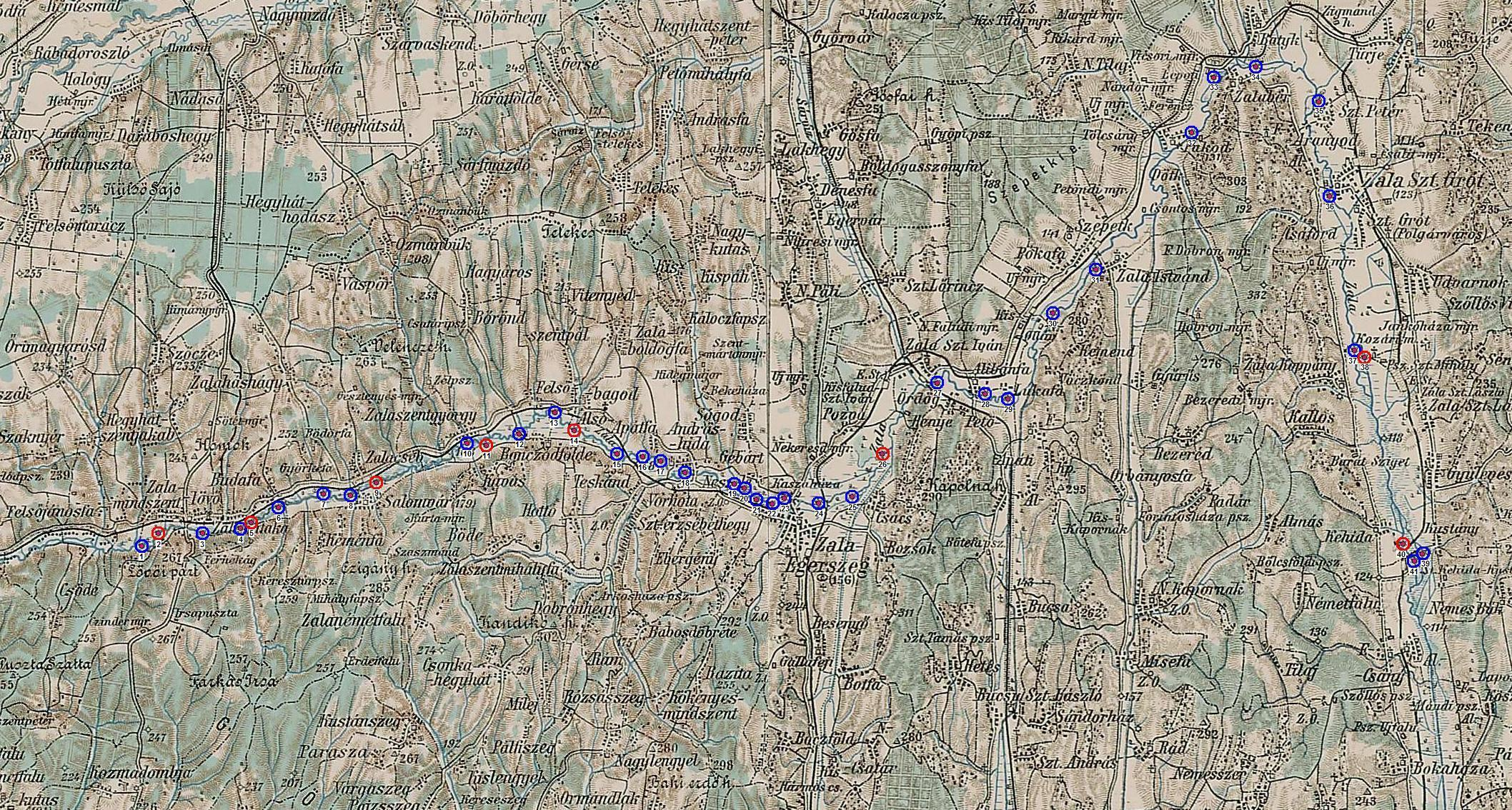
Watermills on Zala river in the end of 19th century

For centuries, the watermills on the Zala river (Zala County, Western Transdanubia, Hungary) had co-existed in a single harmonious unity with each other as well as with the river, the Zala valley and Zala meadow, both latter ones renowned for their beauty. Landscape rehabilitation would indeed be necessary because due to the closure of the mills and the destruction of the sluices, the level of the ground water in the meadows, usually having very loamy soil, has dramatically decreased, which has had detrimental impact on the condition of the meadows. The declining tendency in the grassland culture has not helped either. What is more, in several cases parts of the meadows were turned into arable lands or industrial sites. The final blow to the deteriorating meadows that gradually grew characterless was dealt by the disgraceful regulation (rather the canalisation) of the river Zala in the beginning of the 1960s (Izsák 2016). A further station of the process was the elimination of the mills from the life of the river for all. „There were about 200 known steam mills and watermills in the county Zala at the end of the 1800s (the territory of the county was much larger at that time though) (Molnár 2015). According to the statistical data of the Zala county archives of the year 1949, there were about 180 mills in operation in the county then (140 of which were located in the county’s present, smaller territory). In the beginning of the 1940s, there were still some 37 mills grinding on the river Zala (Izsák and Kummer 2011). One can still find water in some old mill-ponds (For the history of a miller's family, see Jakosa 2011, 2012, both in Hungarian). These ponds provide suitable habitat for some aquatic organisms. As for the history of the published data and photos, I. Hajdu, J. Izsák, Á. Jakosa, Gy. Kummer and Mrs. M. Marx, the latter working with Göcseji Muzeum, Zalaegerszeg decided in 2004 to start gathering documents and data systematically on the watermills along the river Zala. We have based our selection of the mills to be presented on a list from the year 1949 preserved in the Zala-county archives. The chart was provided by Mr. Gy. Kummer. A significant number of the photos were also taken by him. The mills indicated by red characters exist today mainly in documents and in the mind's eye only. For the possibility of hydropower by the water of small rivers, e.g. Zala, see Gerse 2014.

== Operation ==
By sluice („barrage”), usually the full sluice system as well as the sluice gates themselves were referred to in live speech. The couple-of-hundred-meter-long section of the river above the mills that can be swollen by (wooden) sluice gates is called the head race. The river banks right above the sluice gate were often protected by concrete walls from erosion. On this river section, the lowered sluice gate barred and „swelled” or „held” water behind it as one of the preparatory steps of grinding. By the way, the higher or lower position of the sluice before the turbine chamber and before the run-out to the mill-pond, one could control the volume of the water running through the turbine chamber to rotate the turbine. This latter ensured the energy necessary for milling. When grinding, the water was let out to flow onto the turbine encased in the turbine chamber protected by a lattice. From thereon, the water left the turbine chamber via its outlet into the mill pit. (Driftwood and other debris were cleared from the lattice by a rake.) Of course, in the meantime, the water level in the head race continuously decreased as the water was „let out” or „released”. Sluice gates could be raised or let down by specific iron structures. Directly above the sluice gate, practically annexed to it stood the sluice bridge that made it possible to get close to the sluice gates. One could also cross the river using this little bridge. There also used to be a larger bridge on the head race suited for the transportation of grains and flour, but it had usually been ruined by the 1950s and 1960s. During swelling, if the water level in the head race reached the upper edge of the lowered sluice gate, the water cascaded over it, and showered onto a concrete surface producing characteristic sounds, and then rushed into the wide and (3-to-8-meter) deep mill pit. The mill pit was used to be called mill pond in other locations. The expressions appearing in this paragraph aren't uniformly used anyway. It is certain though that the anglers in Zalaegerszeg used these terms in the 1950s. At the lower end of the mill pit that narrowed again, usually a crescent-shaped gravel islet formed. The following outflow section was shallow, and continuously deepened again. The water often meandered along an extended tract, flowing ever slower, and getting ever deeper, to become the head race of the following mill. In some cases, the river was bifurcated above the mill by digging a new branch leading to the mill (and serving as its „head race” or „leat”). On the other branch („small branch) there was also a sluice called „small sluice”. (If I remember well, the related smaller „mill pond” was also called a small pond by the anglers in the past.) By the sluice, one could control the amount of water flowing towards the main branch of the river. The small pond located behind the small sluice flowed into the small branch to rejoin the main branch after about 100 to 200 meters. As far as I recall, small branches and small sluices could only be found in Zalaegerszeg or further downward on the river Zala (but not even there in all the cases: e.g. in the 1950s the Baumgartner mill in Zalaegerszeg didn't feature a small sluice). In the riverbed hollows or incavations could form while in other tracts the water was shallow and running. During floods, everything got messed up: in the stead of the river Zala and its meadow, a spectacular, uninterrupted expanse of water appeared that a few days later receded. In several comments, we refer to piles sticking out from or standing in the water in the immediate vicinity of the mills. The corner of the mill closest to the water was often supported by such a pile. In other cases, the piles upheld a proper planking above the water. Standing on such a planking, one could do maintenance work on the sluice gates, e.g. defrost them. But similar piles may also be remains of old-time wooden bridges. The structure equipped with its own little roof and window often raised on top of the mill building is the ventage of the powder-house, but it could also be used to accommodate the protruding end of the elevator. One could often see a „rain panel” sticking out above the door of the building that protected the people and the sacs from the rain during loading. The by-products of grinding could be used to feed pigs and poultry. Therefore, apart from the stable housing the work-horses, there were often piggeries, henneries or even pigeonries in the vicinity of the mills.

The mills below are referred to primarily by their location, secondarily by their popular name(s). The latter one usually coincides with the name of the last owner or sometimes with that of the tenant. In several cases, the mill ponds even today retain significant amounts of water. One of the potential reasons is that in the old days, springlets surviving up to the present emerged at the bottom of the then several-meter-deep water.

== List of the watermills ==
	Picture	Name	Location	Owner/Tenant	Remarks
1		Jakosa mill	Zalalövő	Ödön J. Jakosa	Until about 1940, there used to be an undershot waterwheel at the southernside
2		Zalalövő mill	Zalalövő		
3		Vizi mill	Zalalövő	Mrs. László Vizi	Typical vegetation of tampered places, e.g. nettle, mulberry, small poplars, willows
4		Molnár mill	Zalalövő-Zalapataka	Jenő Molnár	The building and the turbine chamber
5		Gergulecz mill	Zalalövő	Gergulecz brothers	
6		Bankovics mill	Zalalövő-Budafa	Bankovics brothers	The building from bricks photographed from east, a small part of the turbine chamber is seen on the southern side
7		Zsohár-Károlyi mill	Zalacséb	István Károlyi	The expanded mill building from west
8		Salomvár mill	Salomvár	László Vizi, Mrs. Mesterházy	Concrete remnants
9		Zalacséb mill	Zalacséb	Agricultural Co-operative	
10		Sztancsics mill	Zalaszentgyörgy	Stancsics brothers	The mill on an old photo taken in the time of a festivity. About 1940.
11		Kávás mill	Kávás		
12		Huszár mill	Boncodfölde	Ernő Huszár	The former mill pond taken from the south. Some concrete remnants in the background
13		Baumgartner-Németh mill	Bagodvitenyéd	Mrs. József Baumgartner	The mill taken form the southwest
14		Bagod mill	Bagod		
15		Tóth mill	Martonfa	Károly Tóth	Wall remains in the background
16		Klázer or Varga mill	Teskánd	István Klázer	The mill before being demolished
17		Pozsgai mill	Zalaegerszeg-Apátfa	Kálmán Pozsgai	The southern wall of the mill building. The lawn occupies the site of the former mill-pit. It was filled.
18		'Hídi' or Béry mill	Zalaegerszeg-Andráshida	Béri brothers, Endre Rosenberger	The remains of the wall of the turbine chamber
19		Gógán or Schreiner mill	Zalaegerszeg	Schreiner family	The photo taken from the east
20		Horváth mill	Zalaegerszeg-Neszele	Ferenc Horváth	The opening on the top of the turbine house that used to enclose the shaft
21		Hencz mill	Zalaegerszeg	Hencz sisters	The mill building and the waterwheel taken from the north
22		Gömbös or Németh mill	Zalaegerszeg	Németh heirs	The newer mill building taken from the east. The turbine house and the outflow are to the right. Further to the right (at the right side of the picture), there used to be the sluice gates. There are wooden poles in two different places sticking out of the water in front of the concrete wall. They date back to the time of a previous mill. Around 1940
23		Böhm mill	Zalaegerszeg-Kaszaháza	Jenő Böhm, Mrs. Zoltán Böhm	The large and about 6 meters deep mill pond taken from the south-east. The mill and a small building is in the background. As if the sluice gates were directly in front the latter. The water is flowing partly under the sluice gates, and partly from the sluice chamber. Around 1960. A housing estate was built on the site of the mill in the beginning of the 2000s.
24		Baumgartner or Kummer mill	Zalaegerszeg	Mrs. Imre Baumgartner	The mill pond, the sluice gates, the turbine house, and part of the mill building from the south-east. Around 1960
25		Vér mill	Zalaegerszeg-Csácsbozsok	József Vér	There aren't any traces left of this building by now
26		Pózva mill	Zalaegerszeg-Pózva		Its traces are still remembered by some people
27		Cságoly mill	Pethőhenye	Ferenc Cságoly	The mill building from the east. The turbine house and the sluice gates are to the right, and the mill pond is in the foreground
28		Takács mill	Alibánfa	Jenő Takács	The impressive mill pond with a considerable amount of water in it, the outlet under the former sluice gates, and to its right that of the large turbine house, both behind the pond. It is a large turbine house, and finally a well-preserved mill building. Inside, there is remarkable machinery preserved exemplarily by the current owner of the mill
29		Tőberek mill	Nemesapáti-Tőberek	Endre Nagy	The outflow under the sluice gates, and some remains of the turbine house, taken form the north
30		Légrády-Miszori mill	Kemendollár	Miszory heirs	The north-western corner of the mill
31		Hámos mill	Zalaistvánd	Jenő Hámos	The mill building taken from the south
32		Koch-Domján mill	Pakod	József Koch	This photo was also taken from about the north-east. The outflow of the turbine house is to the right in the foreground. In the middle, the water used to flow out under the sluice gates
33		Csorba mill	Zalabér	Agricultural Co-operative	The mill building has been pleasingly renovated by the current owner. The photo was taken from the north-east
34		Hármasi or Keszler mill	Batyk	state-owned	Remains of the miller's lodge
35		Kutrovácz-Keszler or Hámosi mill	Zalaszentgrót-Tüskeszentpéter	Kutrovácz heirs	The mill building, taken from the north-west. Its image is also used as a trade emblem. The multi-storey mill is still in operation: its grinding activities are powered by electricity
36		Schlésinger mill	Zalaszentgrót	state-owned	The mill from the north
37		Mittermayer-Horváth mill	Zalaszentgrót-Zalakoppány	Mittermayer brothers	The mill from the south
38		Zalakoppány mill	Zalaszentgrót-Zalakoppány		
39		Vöröss mill	Kehidakustány	István Vöröss, József Szabó	Concrete remains
40		Kustány mill	Kehidakustány		
41		Böröck mill	Kehidakustány	Imre Böröck, Gyula Németh, Mrs. Koszovszky	An old picture of the mill from the west, about 1960

== Gallery ==
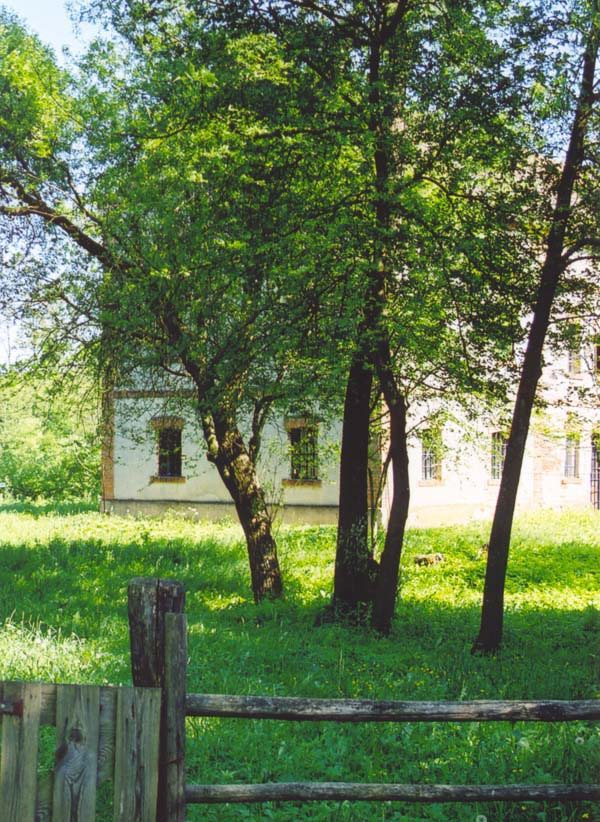
Jakosa mill from the north, Zalalövő, 2005

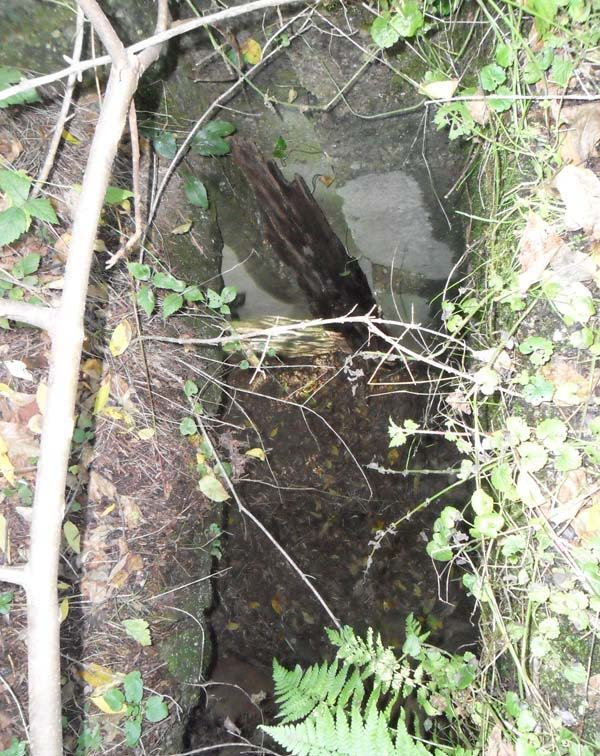
Vizi mill, remains of the turbine chamber, Zalalövő, 2005

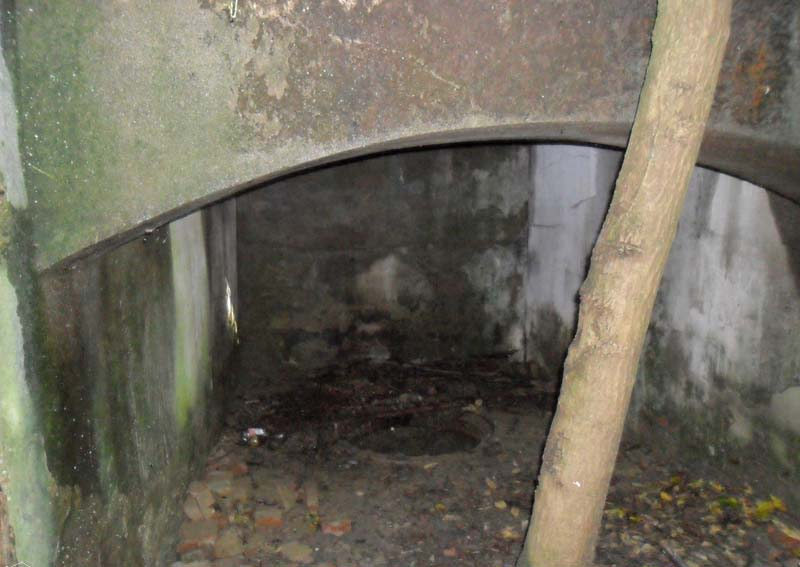
Vizi mill, remains of the turbine chamber, Zalalövő, 2005

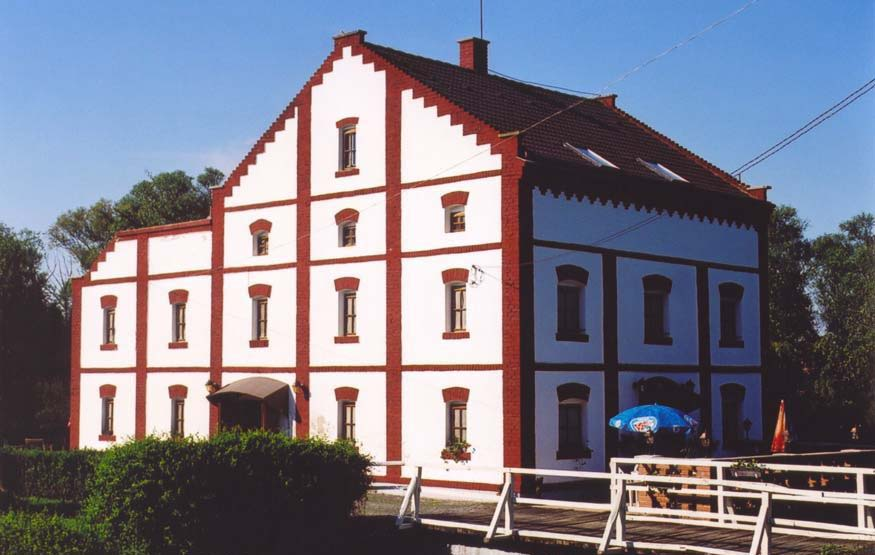
Molnár mill from southeast, Zalapataka, about 2010

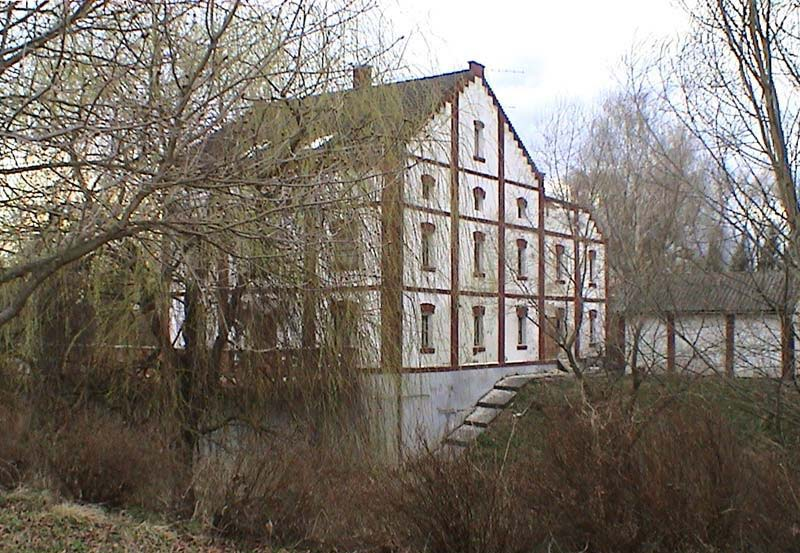
Molnár mill from southeast, Zalapataka, about 2010

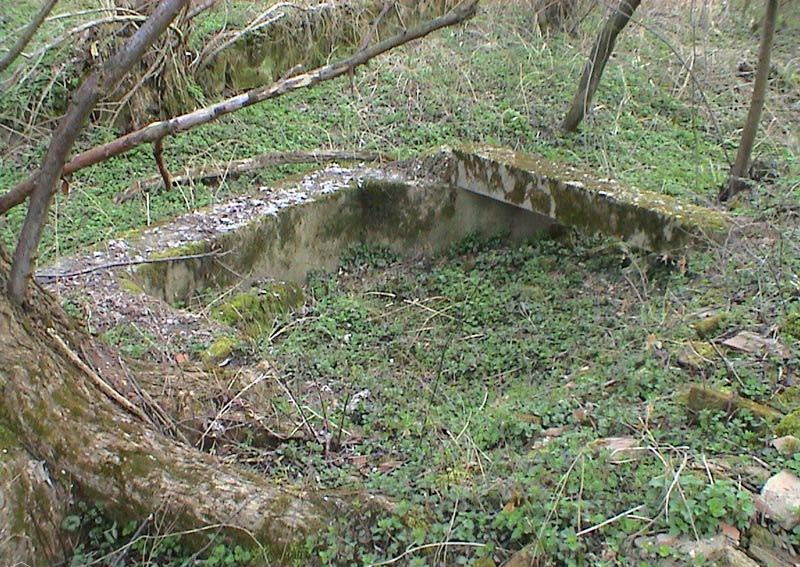
Bankovics mill, Budafa, 2005

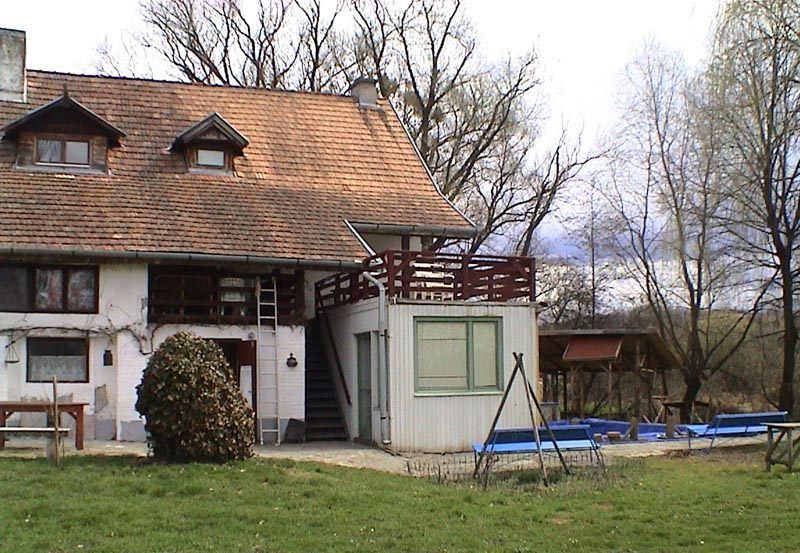
Zsohár-Károlyi mill, Zalacséb-Gyökefa, rebuilt, 2010

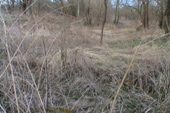
Salomvár mill, the place of the millpond, 2005

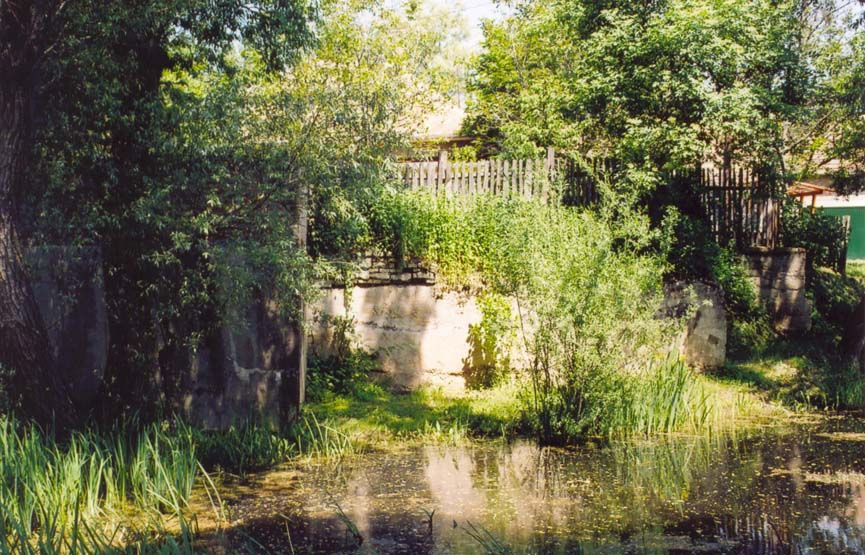
Huszár mill, concrete remains, Boncodfölde

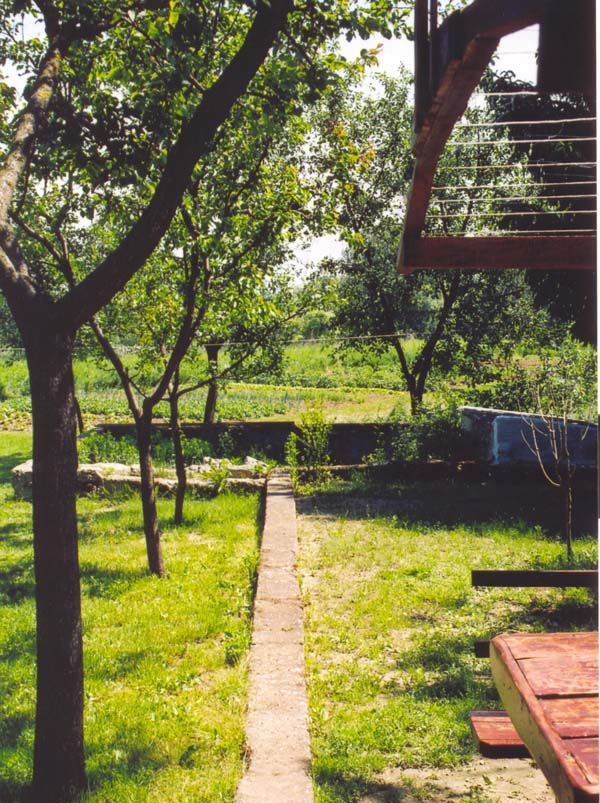
Huszár mill, the concrete stripe represents the contour of the mill, Boncodfölde

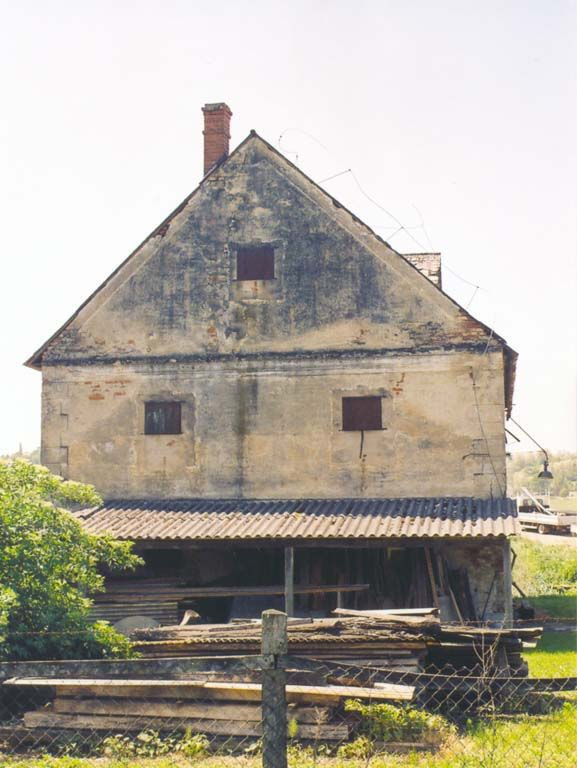
Baumgartner-Németh mill from the north, Bagodvitenyéd, 2010

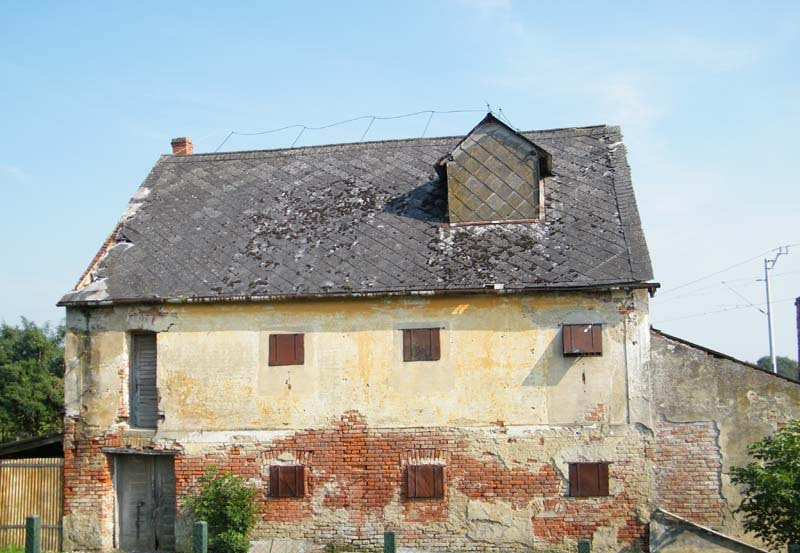
Baumgartner-Németh mill from the west, Bagodvitenyéd, 2010

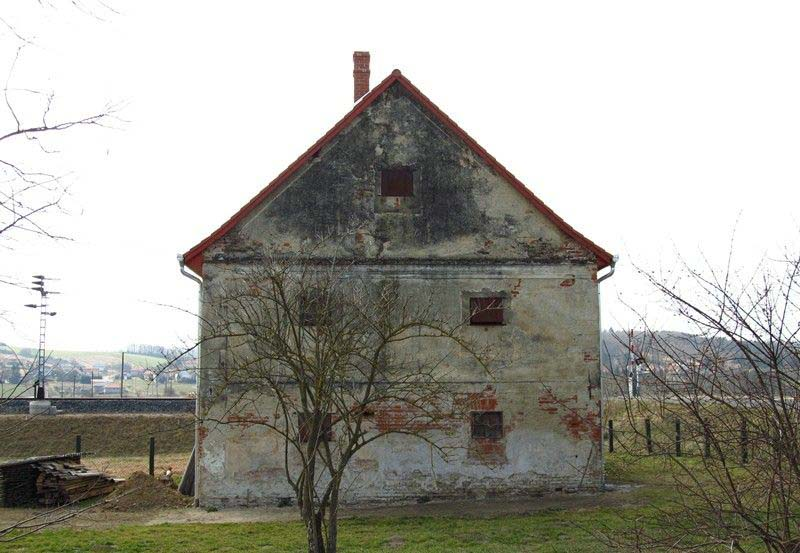
Baumgartner-Németh mil, Bagodvitenyéd, 2010

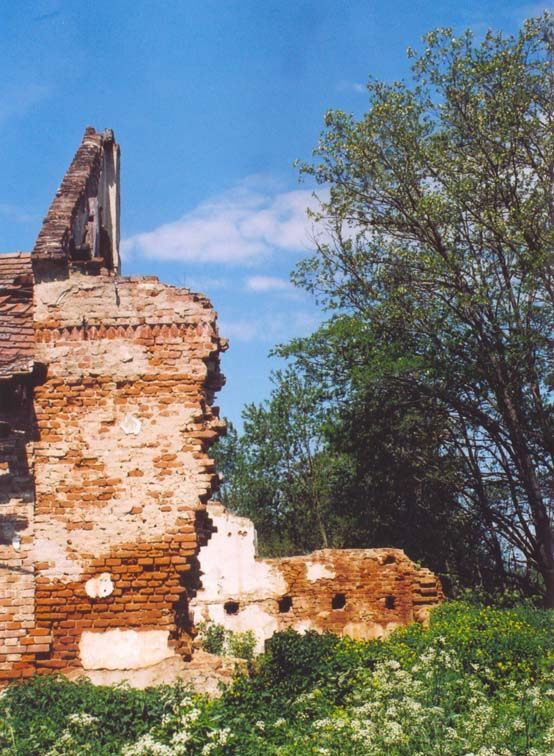
Tóth mill, Martonfa, 2005

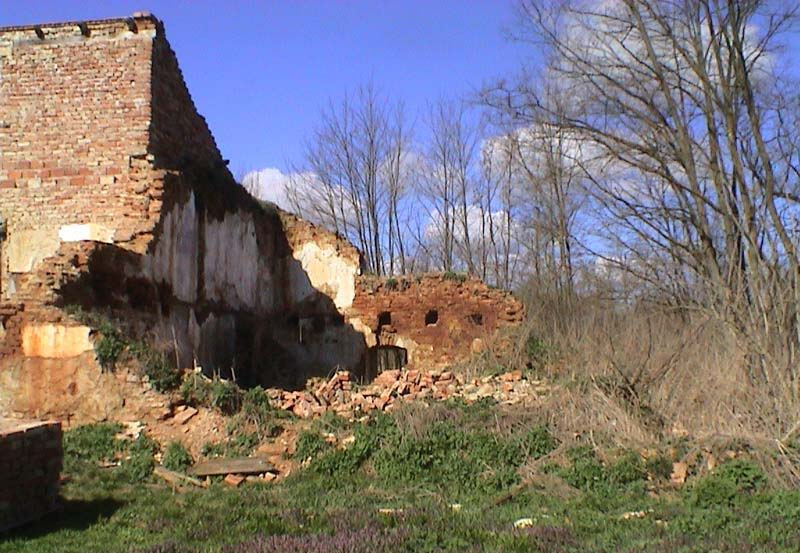
Tóth mill, Martonfa, 2005

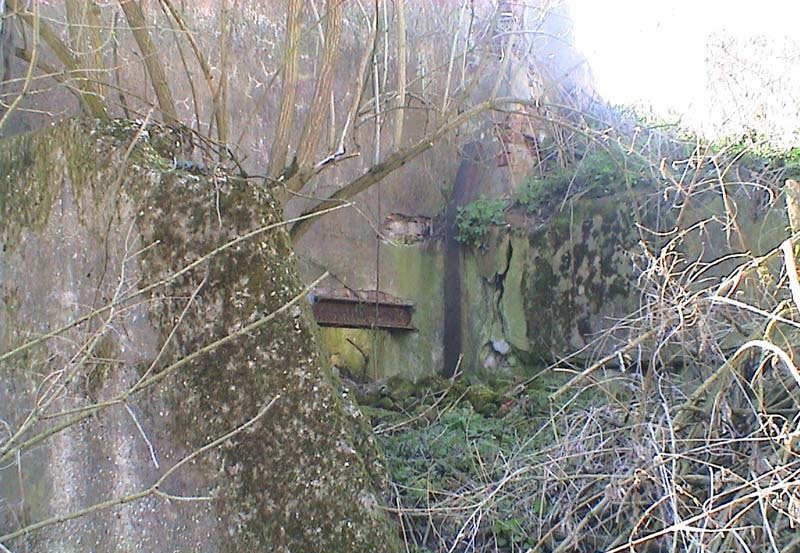
Tóth mill, Martonfa, 2005

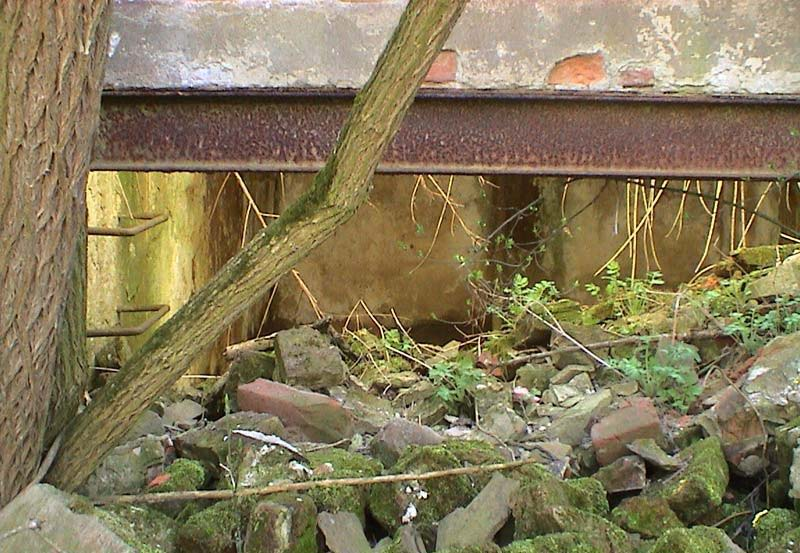
Tóth mill, Martonfa, 2005

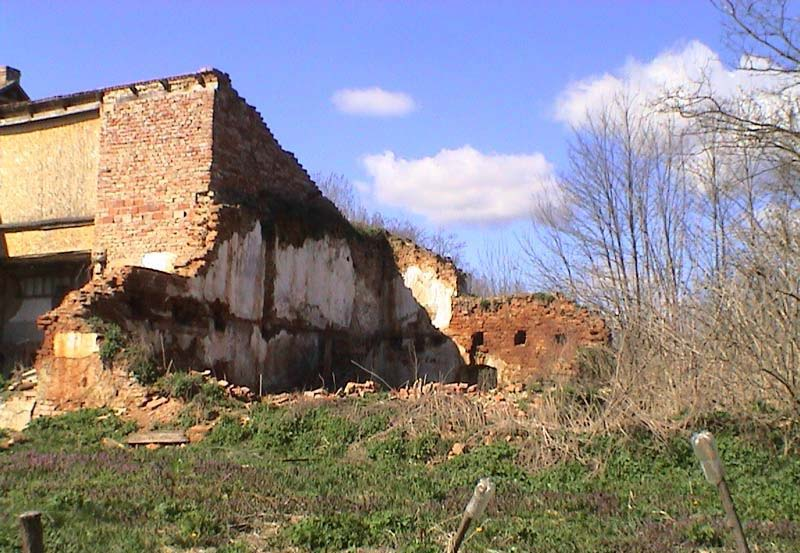
Tóth mill, Martonfa, 2005

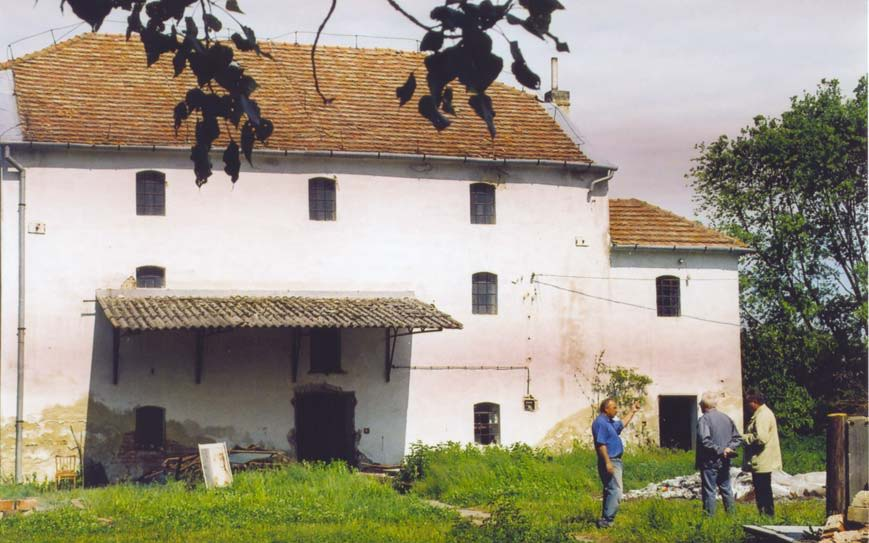
Klázer or Varga mill from the south, Teskánd, 2005

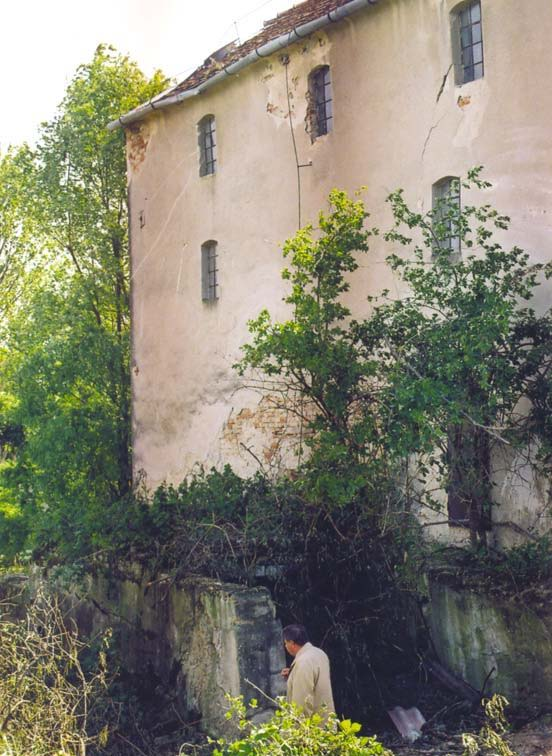
Klázer or Varga mill, Teskánd, 2005

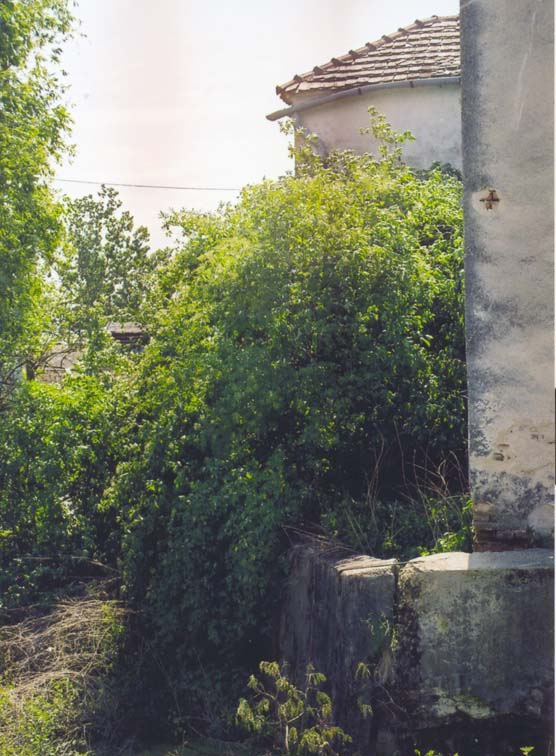
Klázer or Varga mill, Teskánd, 2005

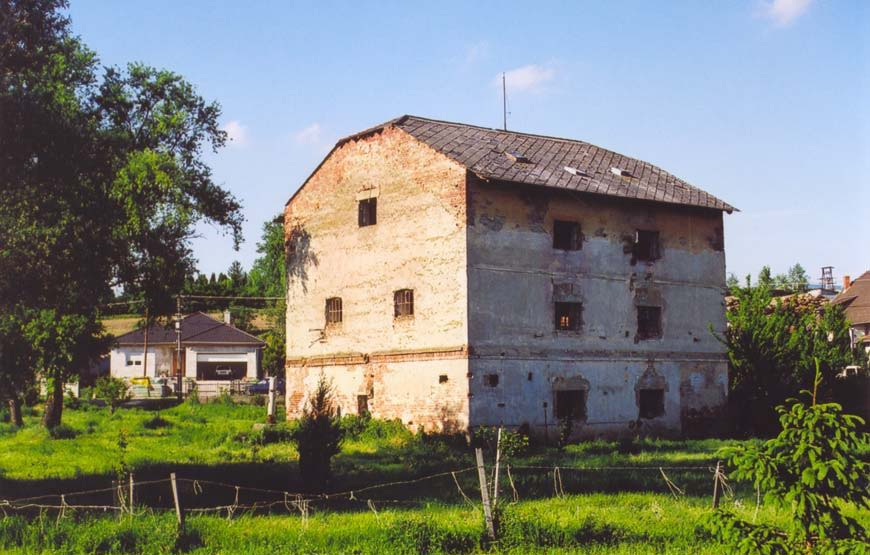
Pozsgai mill from the southwest, Apátfa, 2005

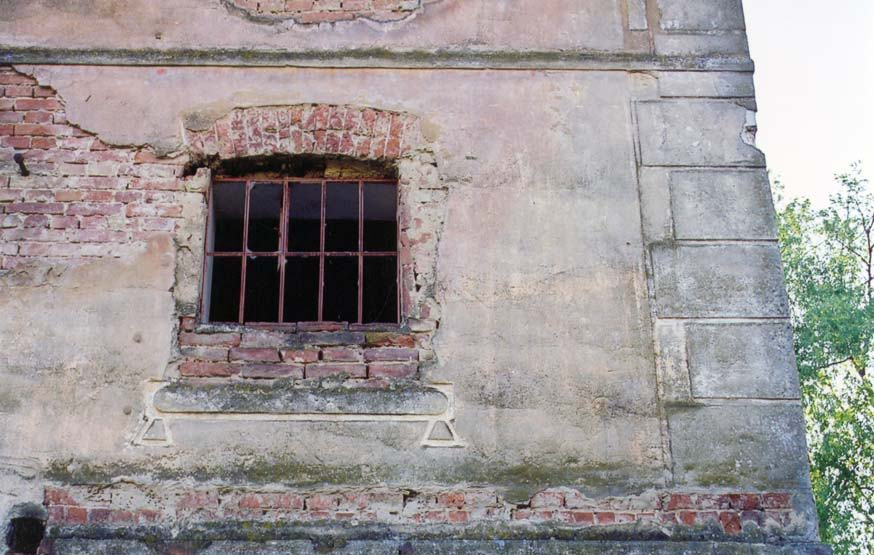
Pozsgai mill from the east, Apátfa, 2005

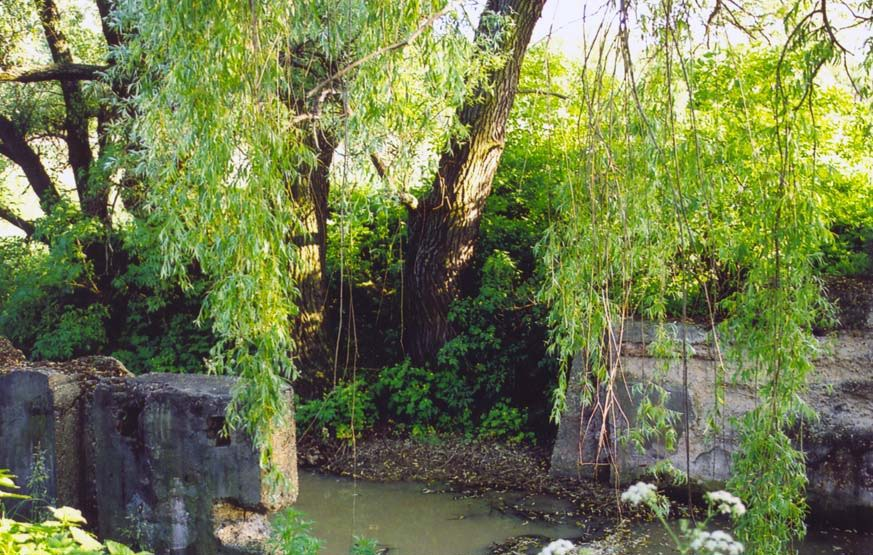
"Hídi" vagy Béry mill, the former millpond from the north, Andráshida, 2005

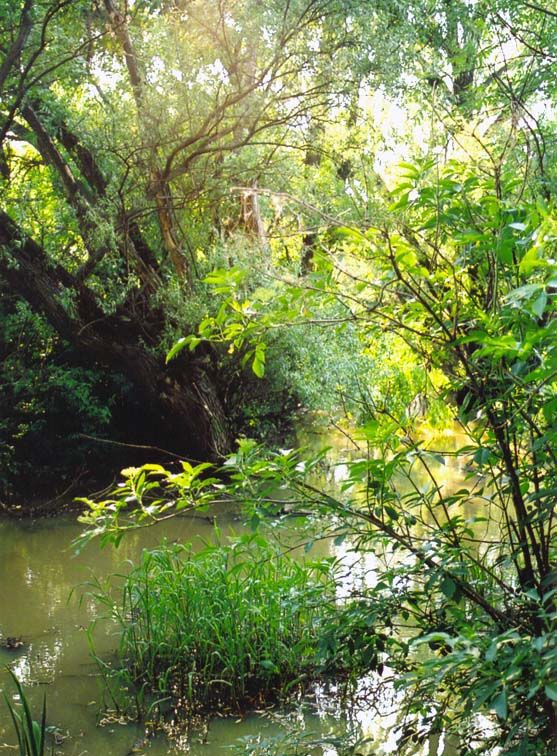
"Hídi" vagy Béry mill, the former millpond from the east, Andráshida, 2005

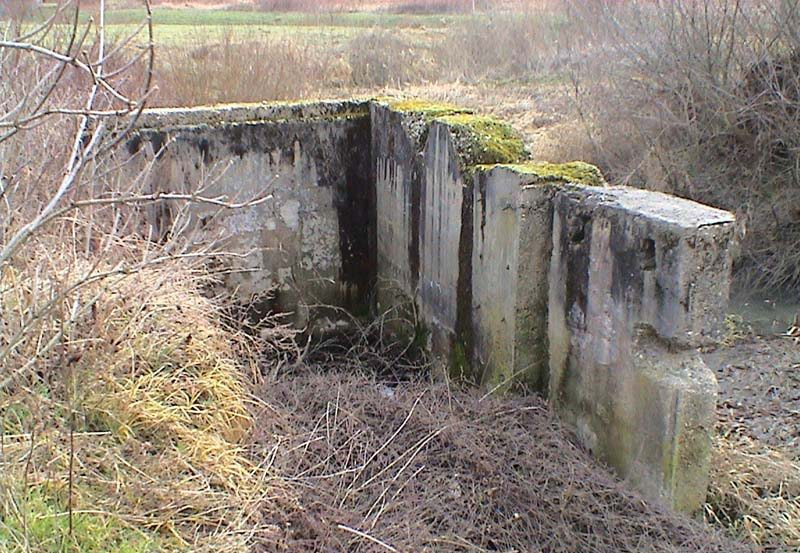
"Hídi" vagy Béry mill, remains of a concrete wall, Andráshida, 2005

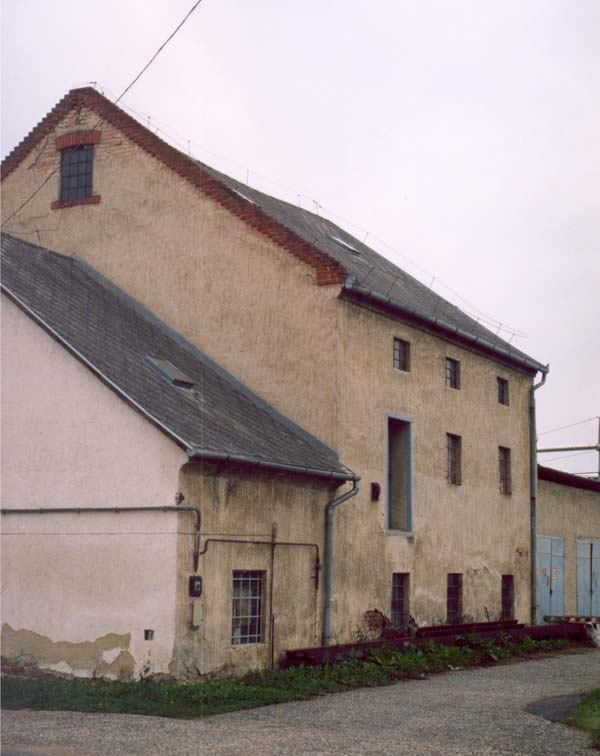
Gógán vagy Schreiner mill, with an annex, Zalaegerszeg, 2011

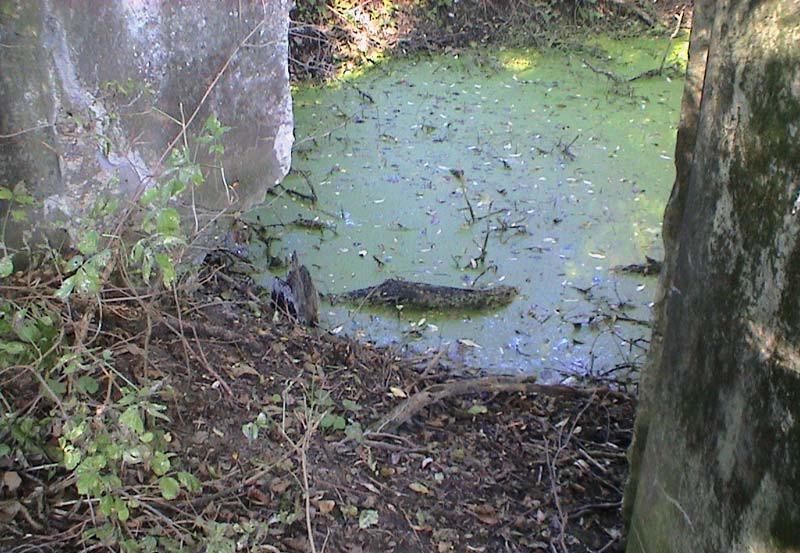
Horváth mill, the former millpond from the west, Neszele, 2009

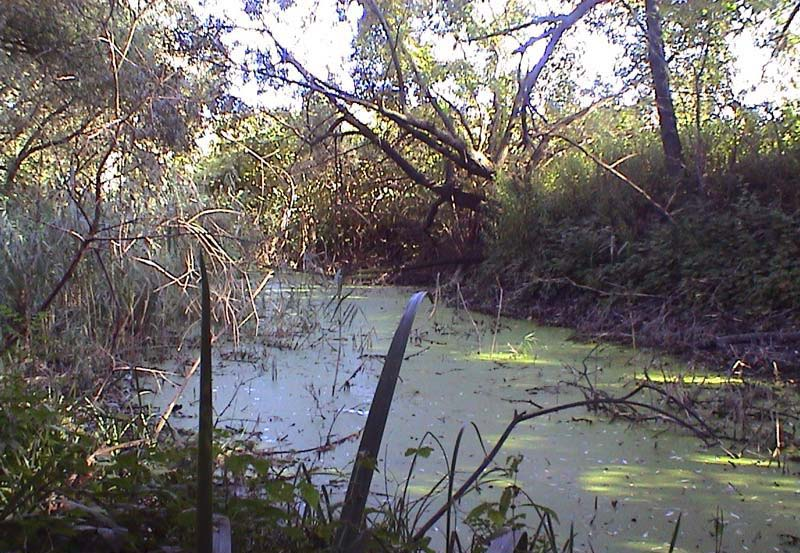
Horváth mill, the former millpond from the northwest, Neszele, 2009

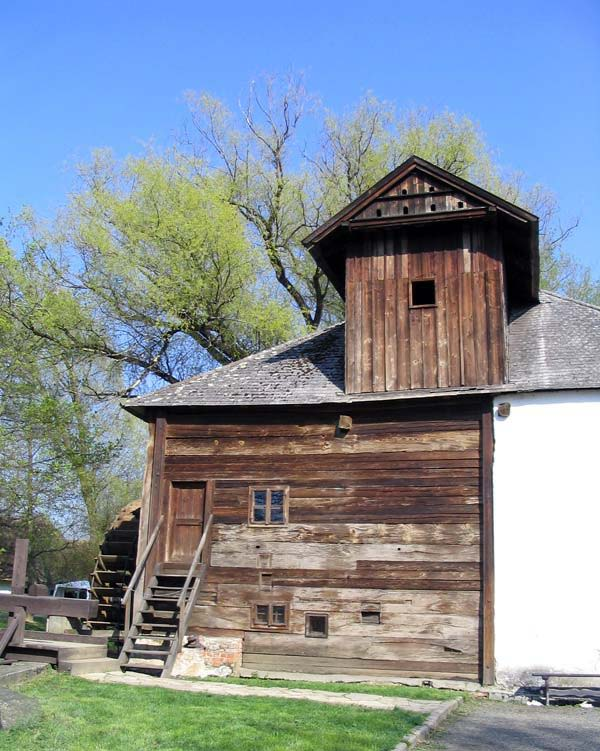
Hencz mill, the woody part of the building from the west, Zalaegerszeg, 2005

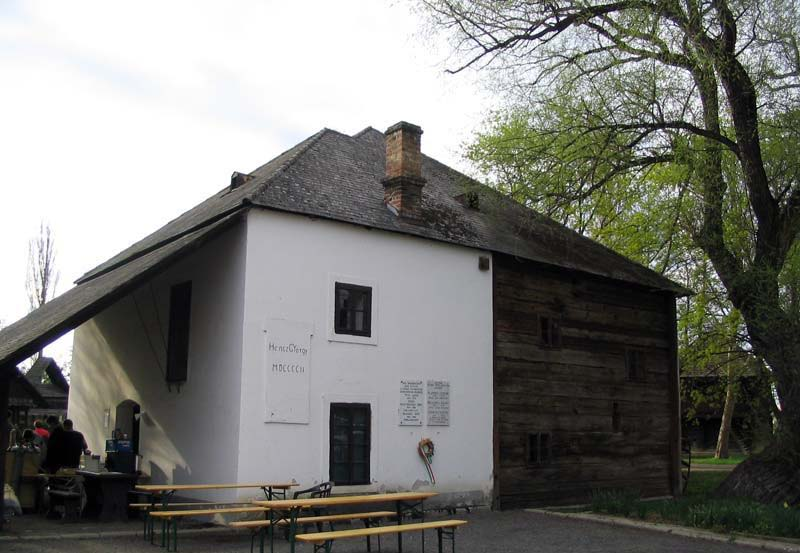
Hencz mill, the wall of the mill with a plaque dedicated to György Hencz, a former owner, taken from the east, Zalaegerszeg, 2005

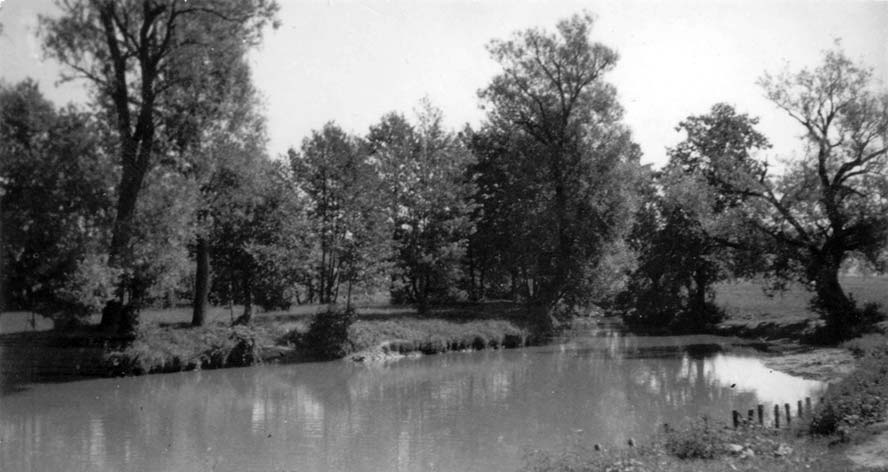
Gömbös or Németh mill, the former millpond from the southwest, Zalaegerszeg, around 1940

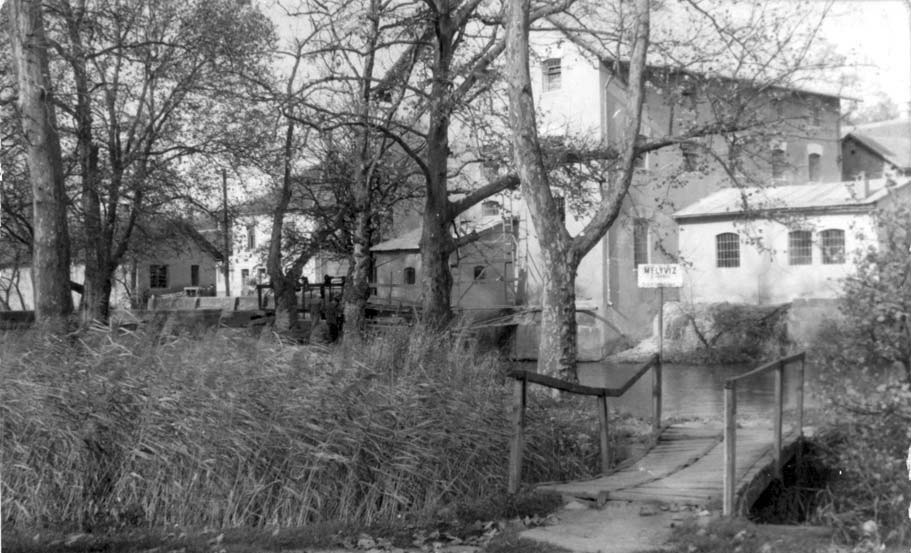
Böhm mill (old town 'beach'), Kaszaháza, around 1960

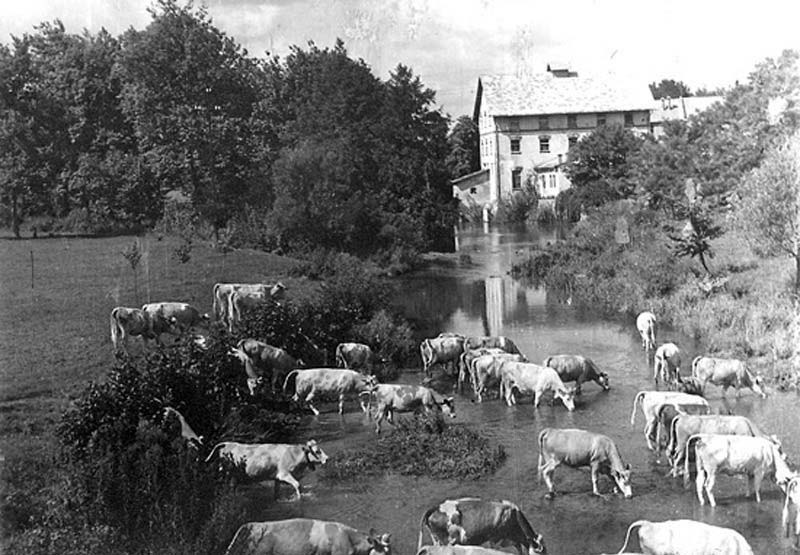
Böhm mill (old town 'beach'), Kaszaháza, around 1950

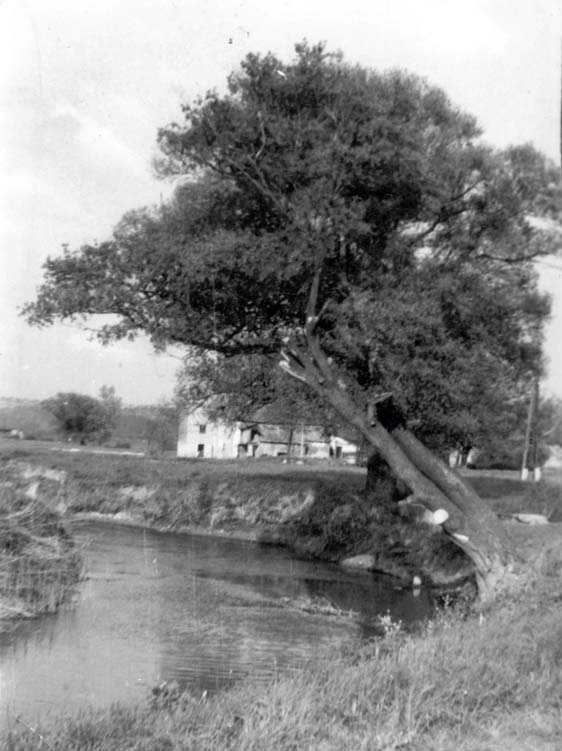
Baumgartner or Kummer mill, from the west, Zalaegerszeg, around 1960

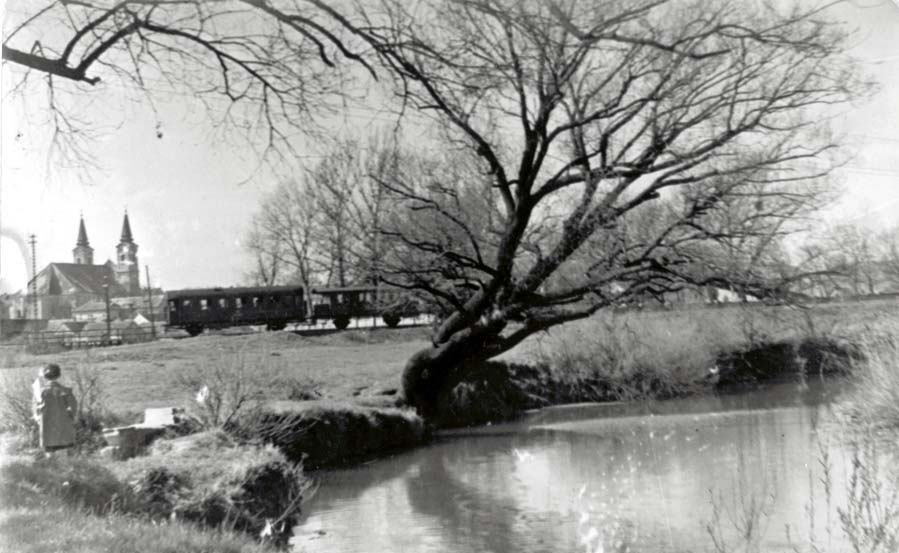
Baumgartner or Kummer mill, the Zala river, Zalaegerszeg around 1960

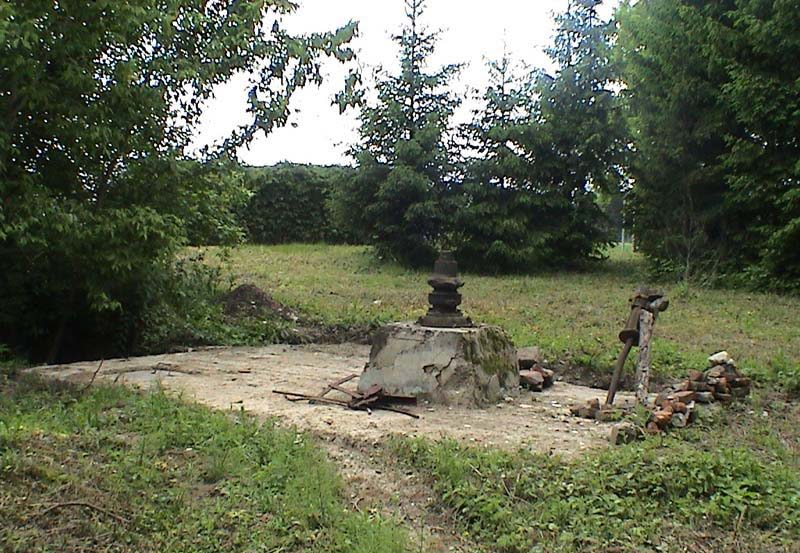
Baumgartner or Kummer mill, the concrete cover of the turbine chamber, at the same time the bottom of the turbine house, Zalaegerszeg

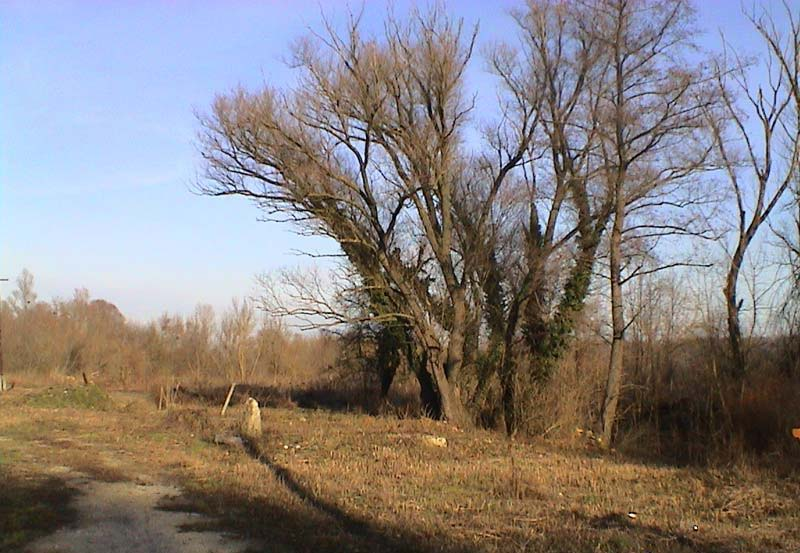
Vér mill, stone remains, Csácsbozsok, 2011

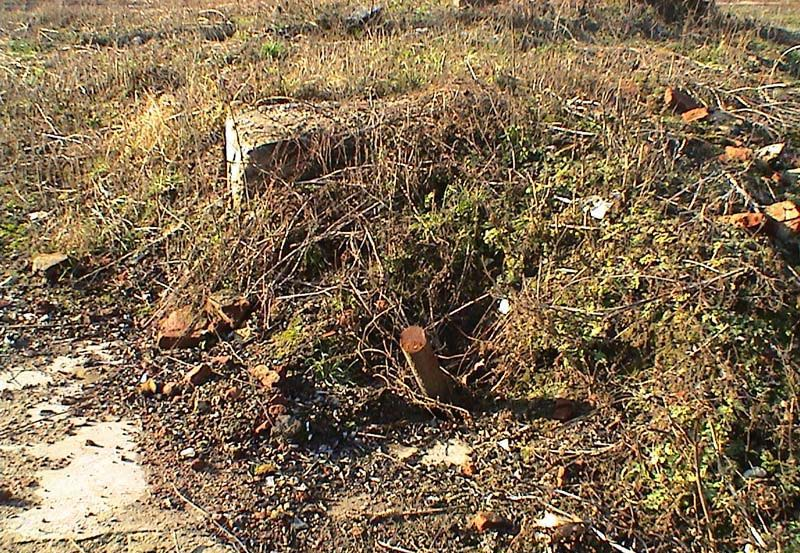
Vér mill, the top part of the turbine chamber and an iron vestige, Csácsbozsok, 2011

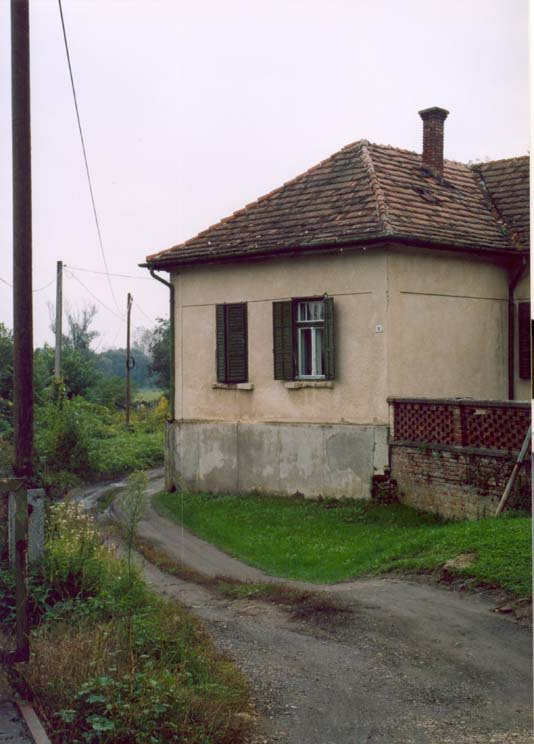
Cságoly mill, the miller's lodge, Petőhenye, 2005

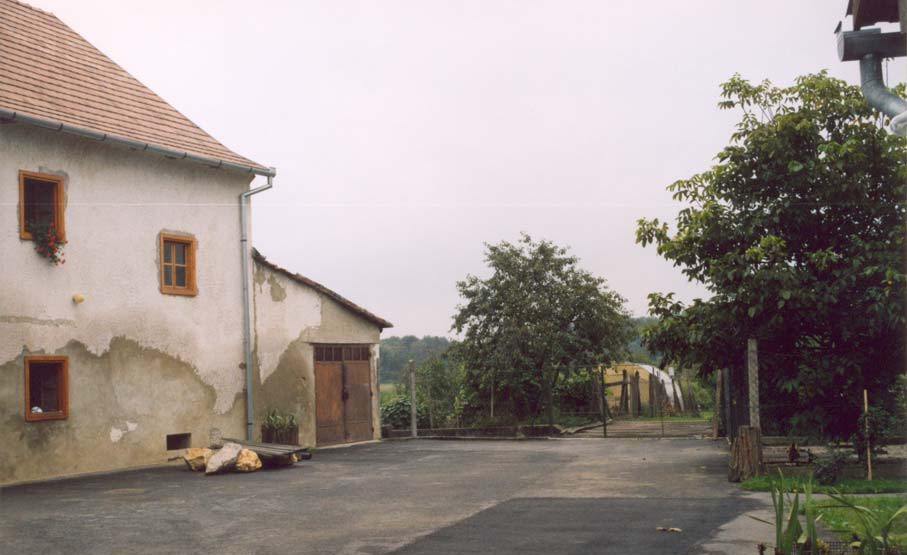
Takács mill, Alibánfa

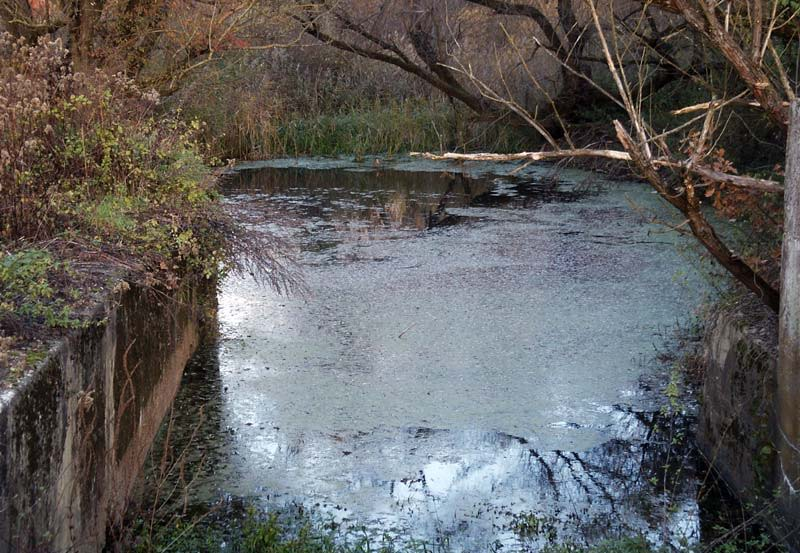
Tőberek mill, the millpond from the west, from the former sluice-bridge, Nemesapáti

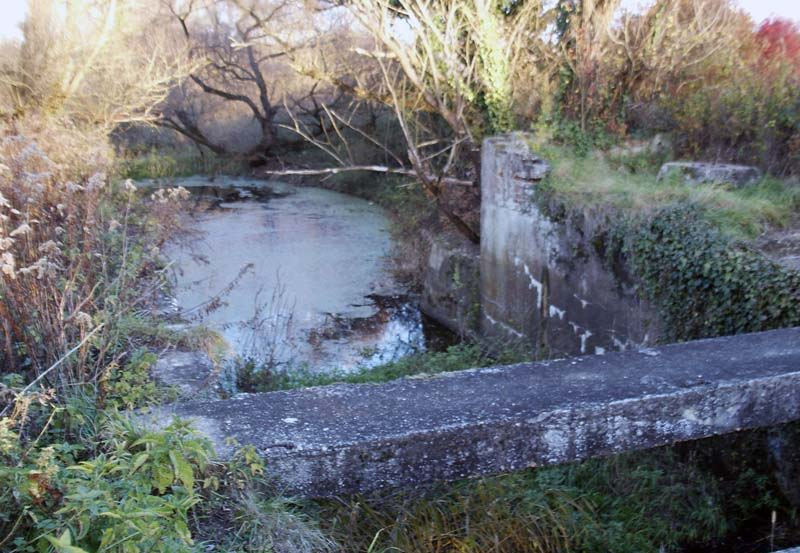
Tőberek mill, the millpond from the west, from the former sluice-bridge, Nemesapáti

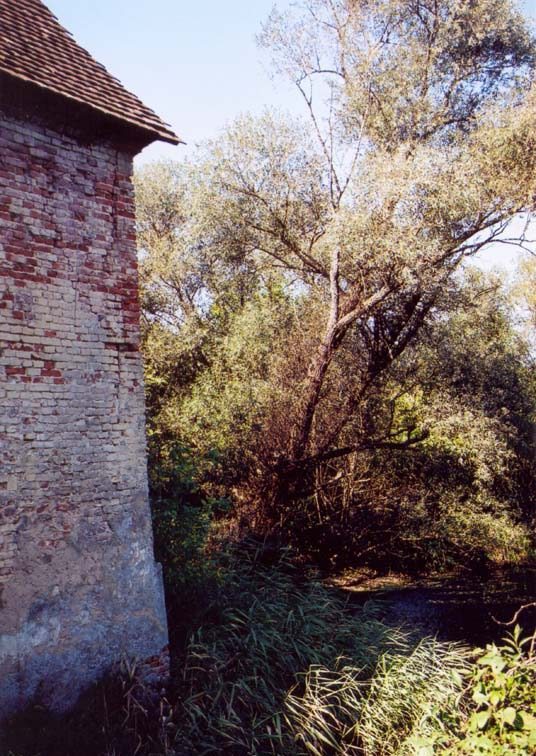
Légrády-Miszori mill, southeastern corner of the mill, Kemendollár, 2006

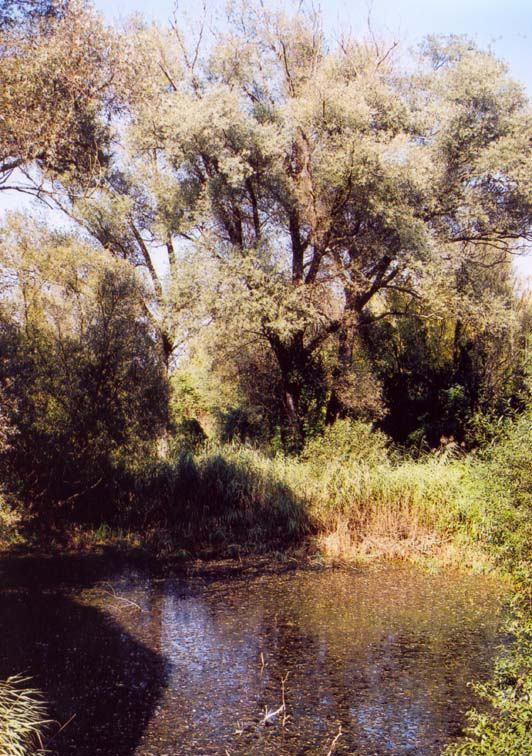
Légrády-Miszori mill, the millpond from the west, Kemendollár, 2006

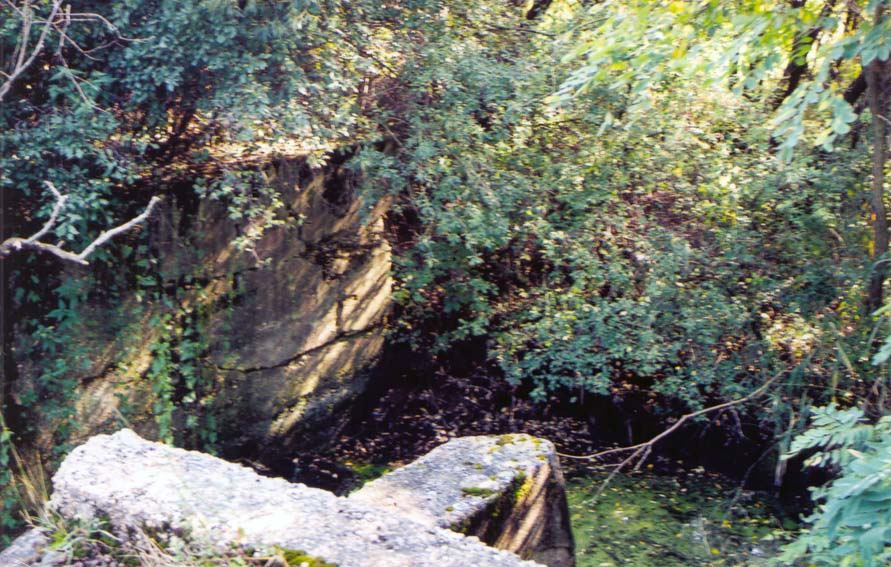
Légrády-Miszori mill, the endrance of the pond seen from sluice-bridge, Kemendollár, 2006

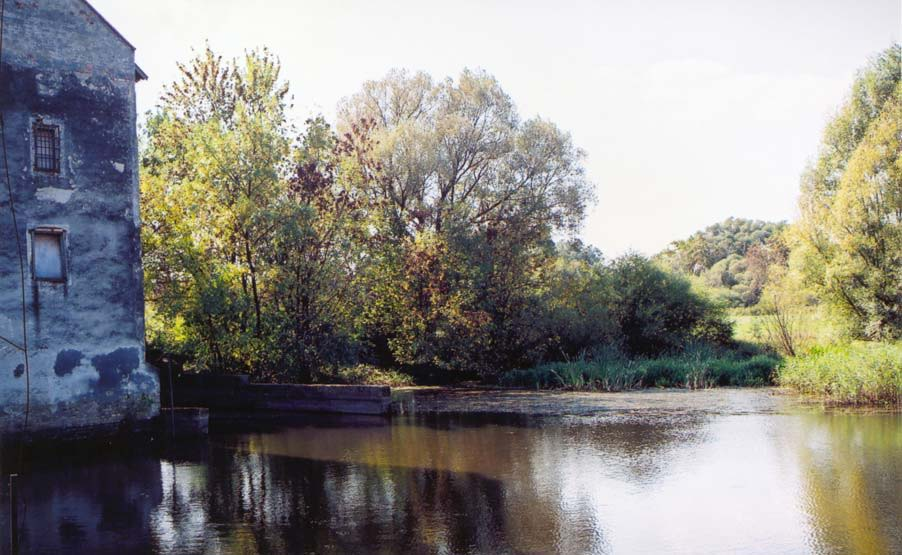
Hámos mill, the millpond from the southeast, Zalaistvánd

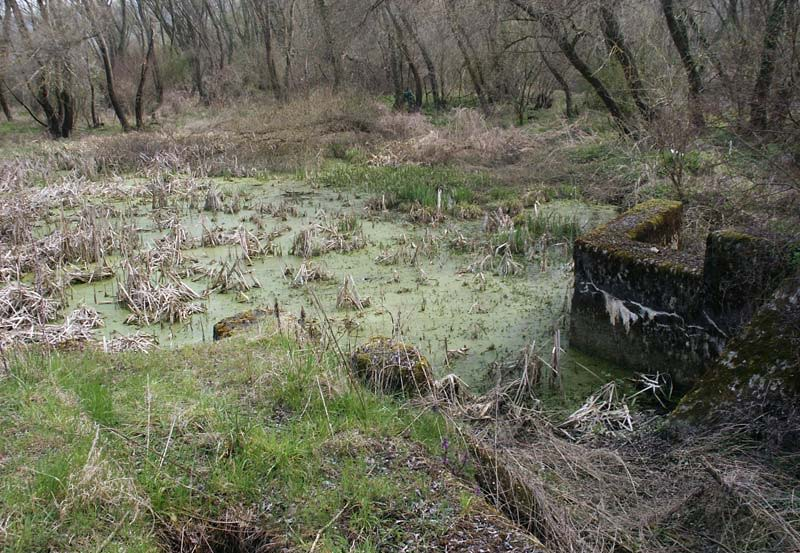
Koch-Domján mill, the millpond and the turbine chamber from the northwest, Pakod, 2011

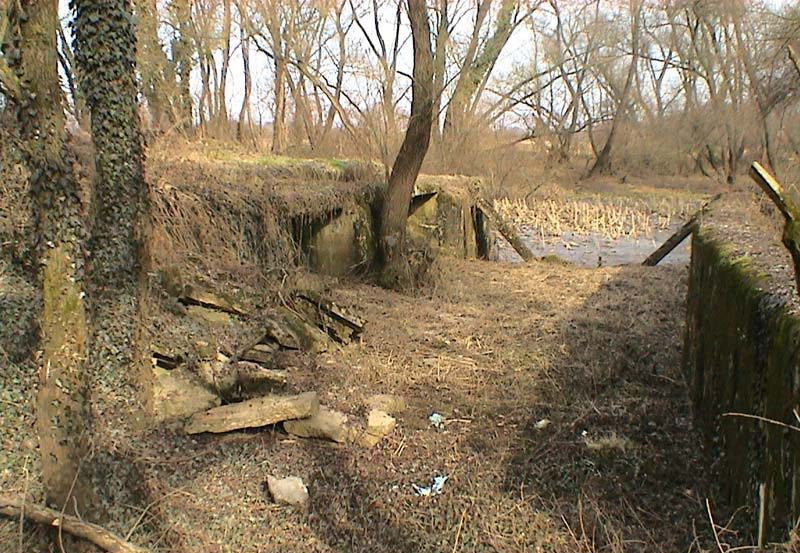
Koch-Domján mill, the former riverbed of Zala, Pakod, 2011

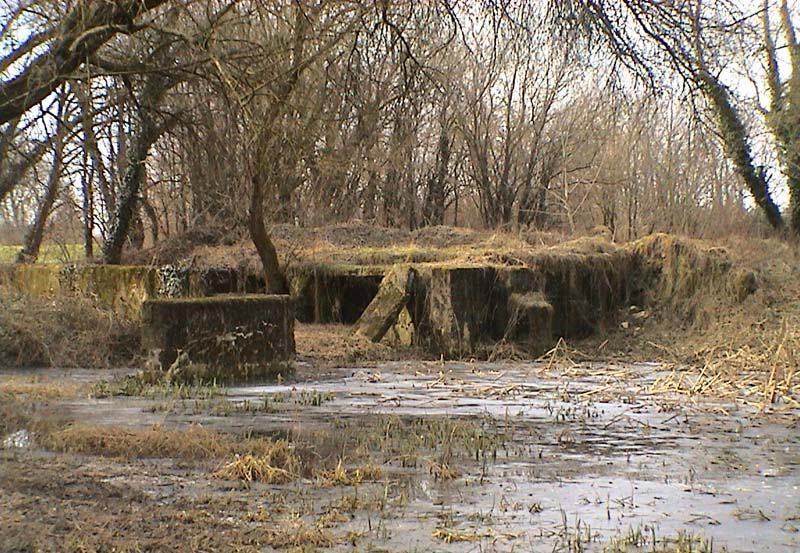
Koch-Domján mill, the former millpond, Pakod, 2011

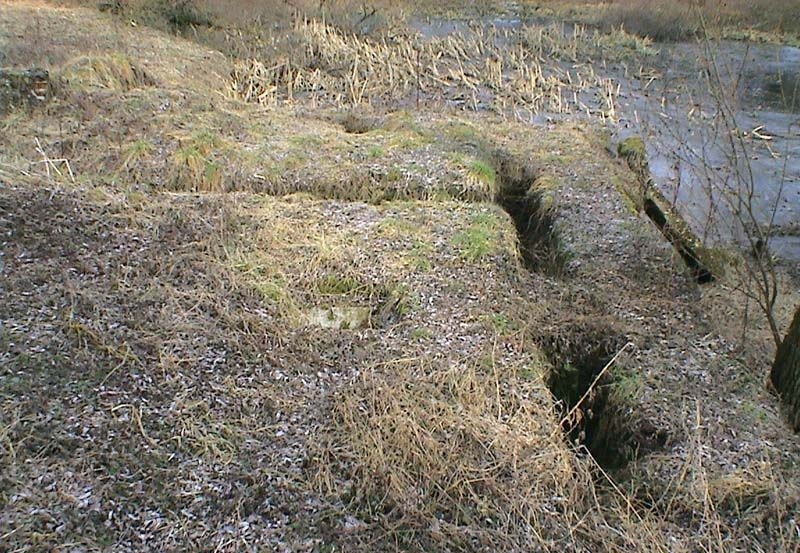
Koch-Domján mill, the top of the turbine chamber with the hole of the turbine shaft in the middle, Pakod, 2011

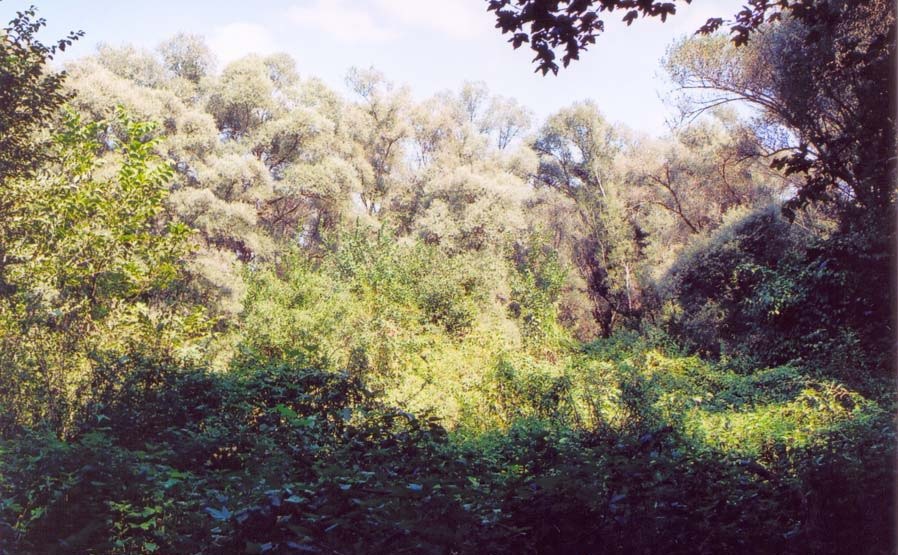
Koch-Domján mill, the former large and deep mill pond has nearly disappeared, Pakod, 2011

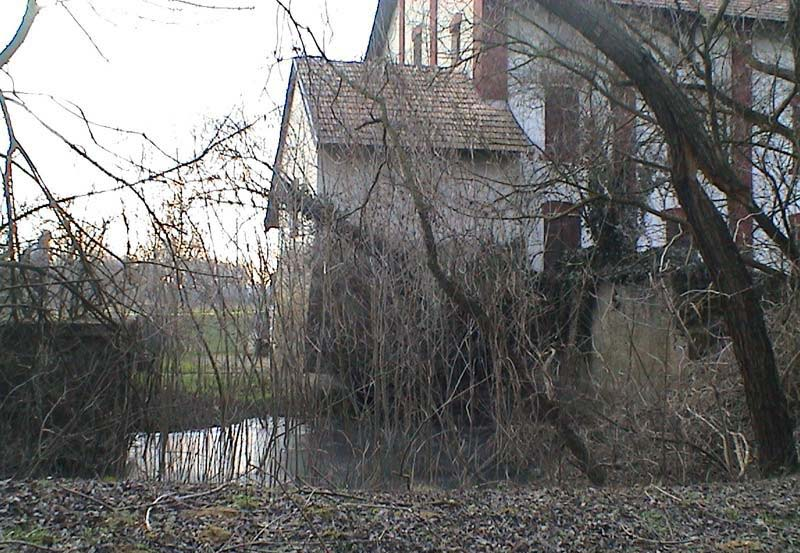
Csorba mill, the former mill pond with the turbine chamber and a partial view of the mill building from the southeast, Zalabér, 2011

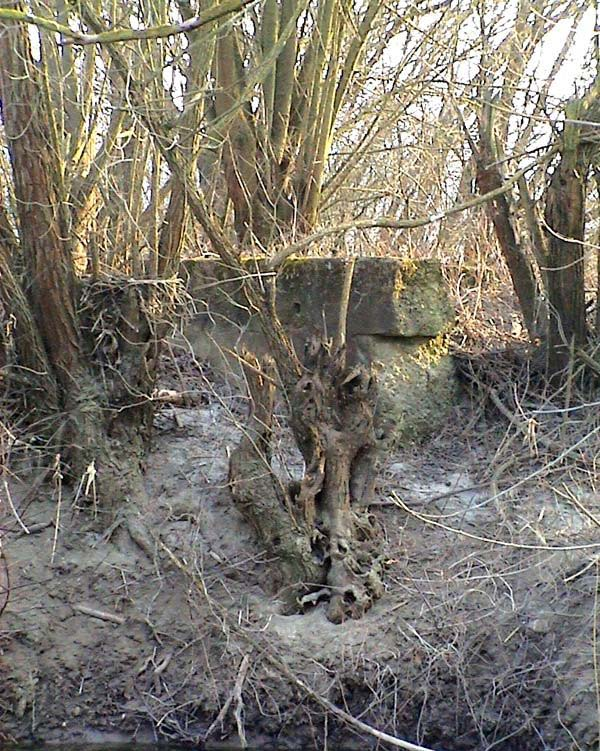
Hármasi or Keszler mill, concrete remains, Batyk

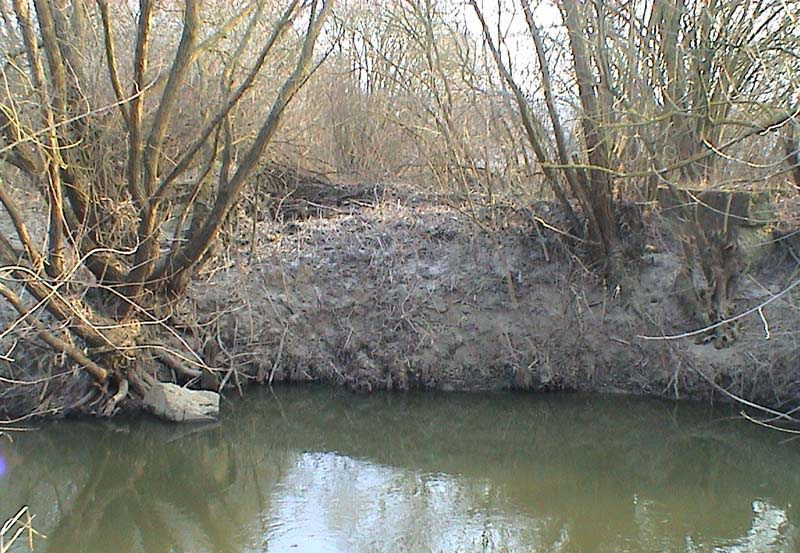
Hármasi or Keszler mill, the current riverbed of Zala at the former mill, remains of the sluice system in the background, Batyk

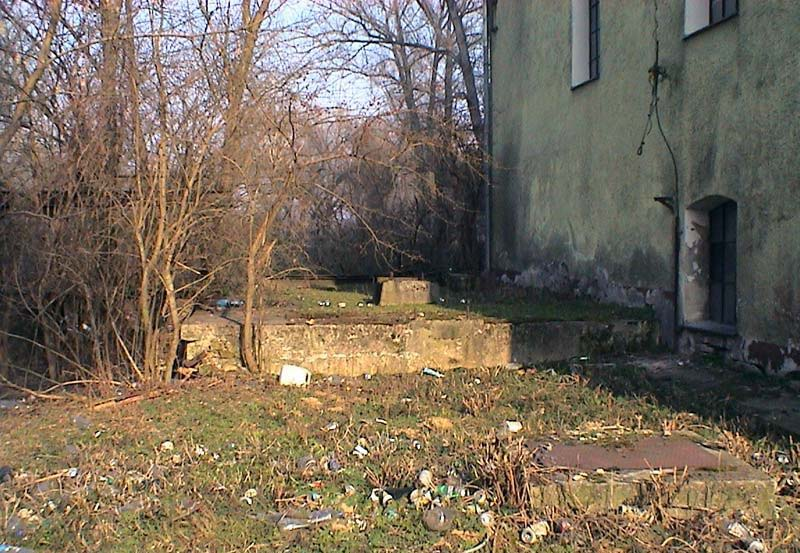
Kutrovácz-Keszler or Hámosi mill, the western wall of the former mill building, Tüskeszentpéter

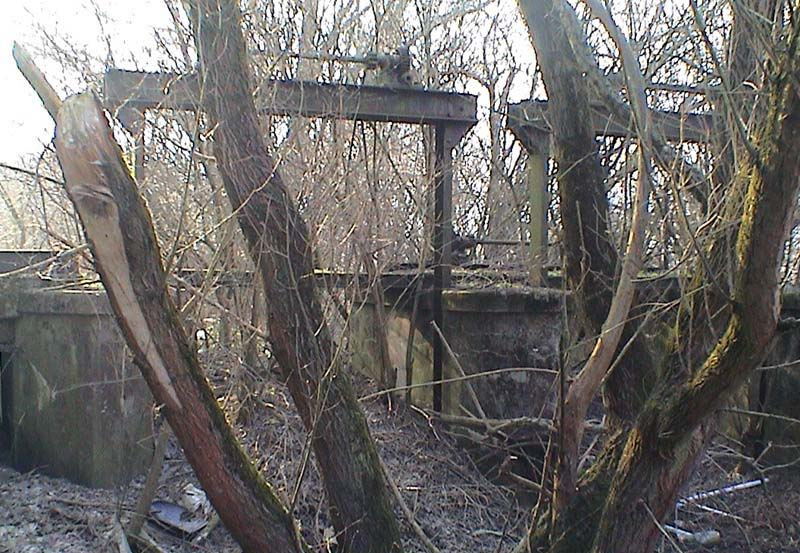
Kutrovácz-Keszler or Hámosi mill, two separate sluices, Tüskeszentpéter

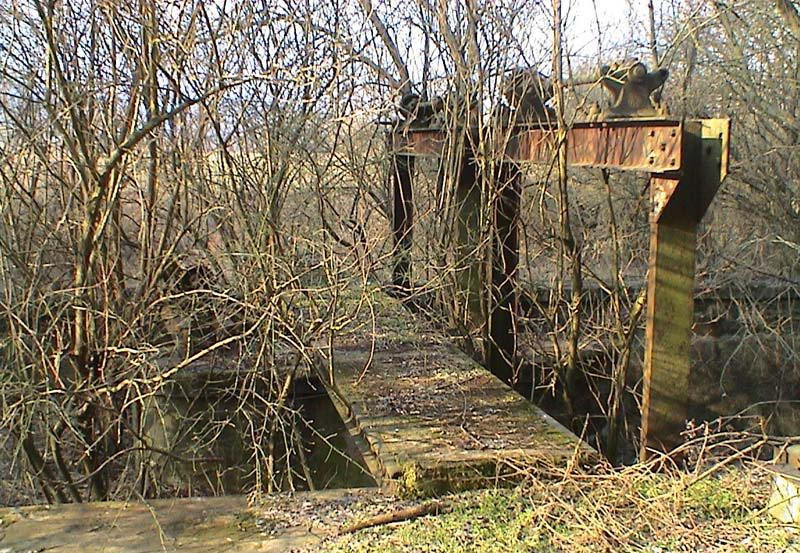
Kutrovácz-Keszler or Hámosi mill, the sluices and the bridge, Tüskeszentpéter

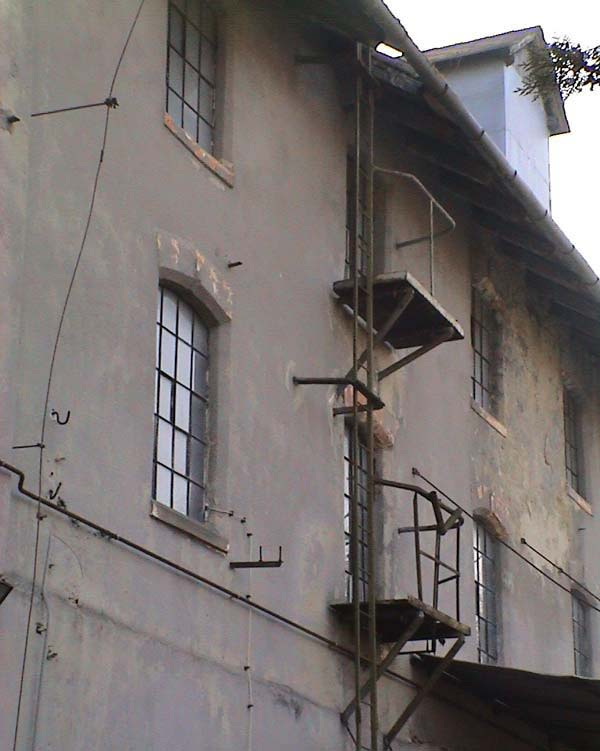
Schlésinger mill, the northern wall, Zalaszentrót

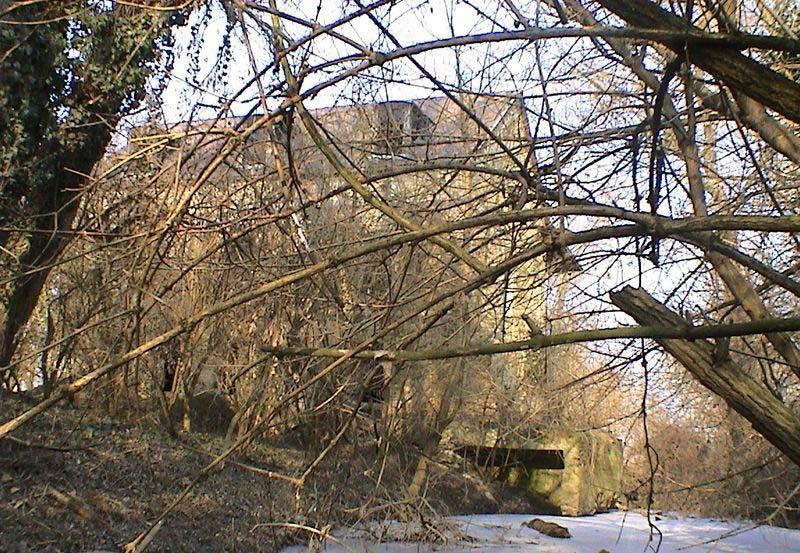
Mittermayer-Horváth mill, the millpond, Zalakoppány, 2011

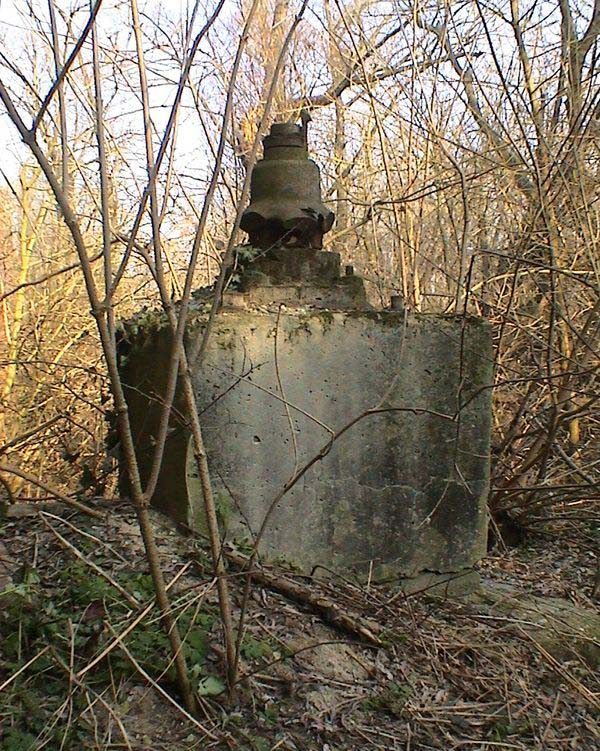
Mittermayer-Horváth mill, the remains of the turbine, Zalakoppány, 2011

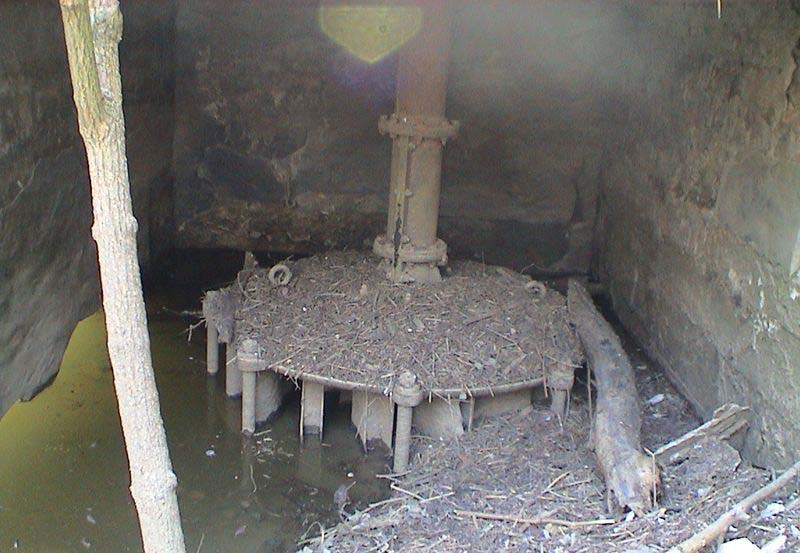
Mittermayer-Horváth mill, the remains of the turbinechamber, Zalakoppány, 2011

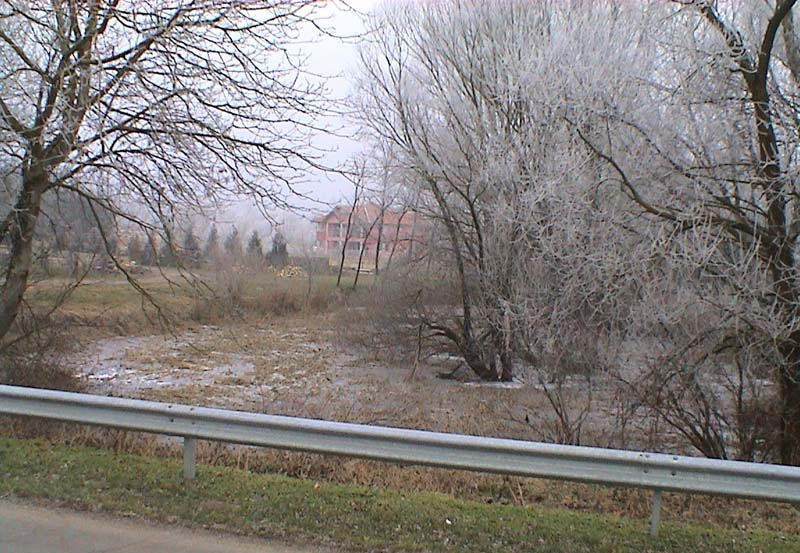
Vöröss mill, the former millpond from the north, Kehidakustány, 2011

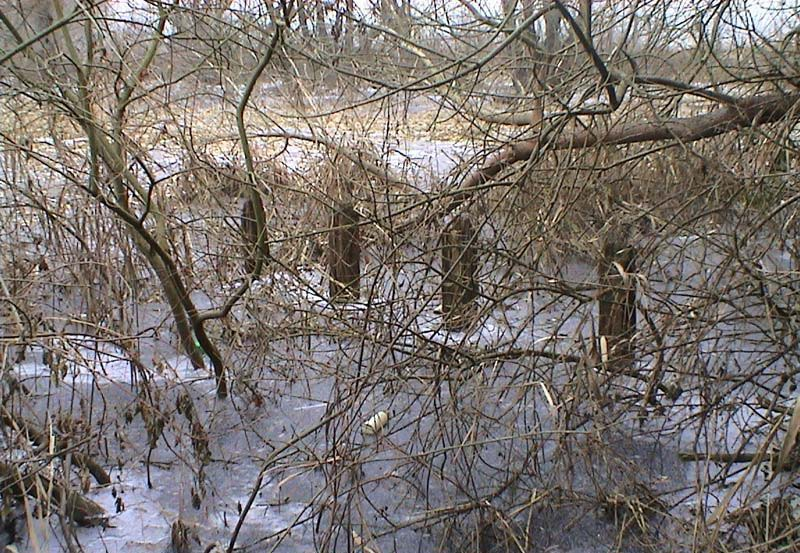
Vöröss mill, row of piles in the water, Kehidakustány, 2011

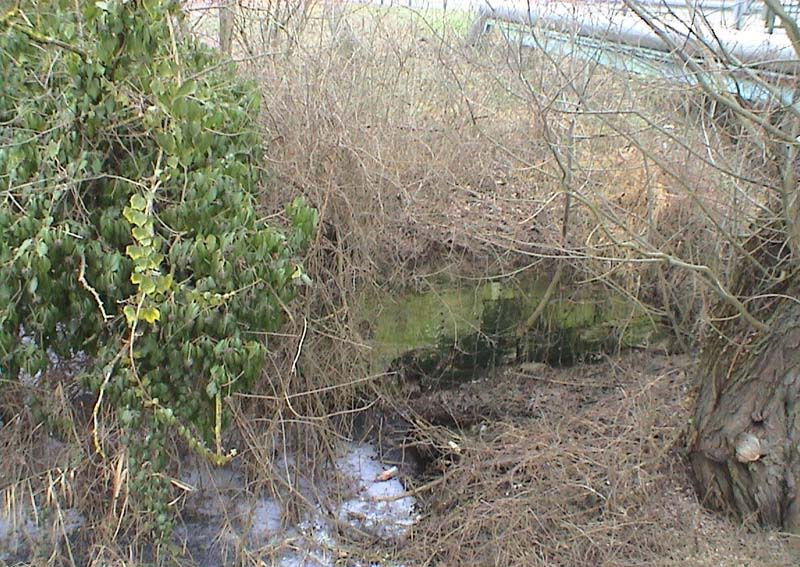
Vöröss mill, concrete remains, Kehidakustány, 2011

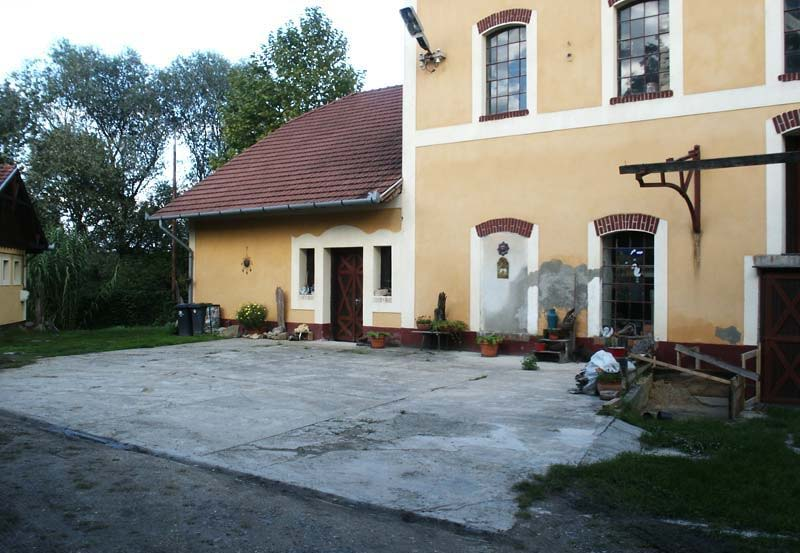
Böröck mill, the renovated building of the mill, Kehidakustány, 2011

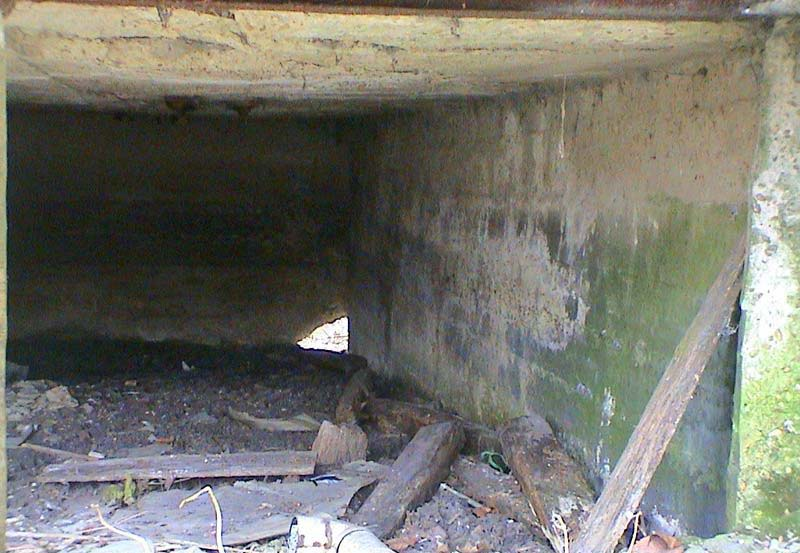
Böröck mill, the turbine chamber, Kehidakustány, 2011

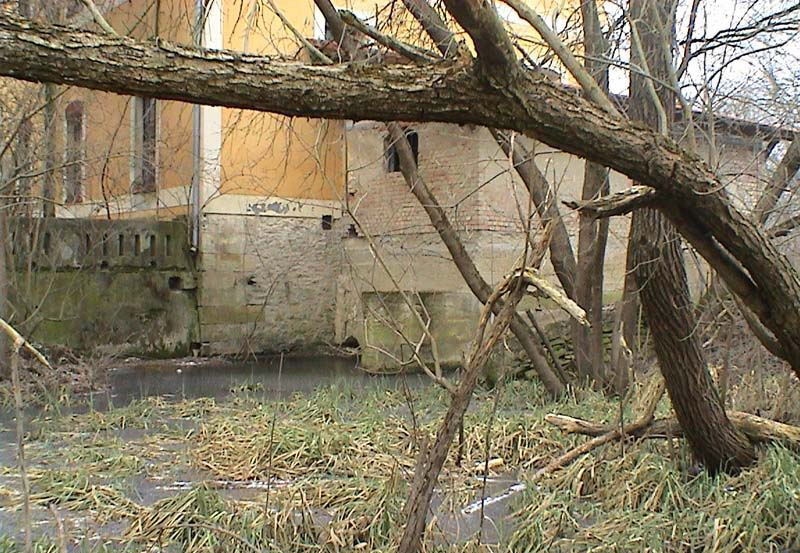
Böröck mill, the millpond and the turbine outlet, Kehidakustány, 2011

== Sources ==
- László Molnár: One-time watermills in present-day Zalaegerszeg. Zalai Múzeum, 2015, vol. 22. pp. 301–330. (in Hungarian, with an English summary)
- Árpád Jakosa: Our Family! Genealogy. (In Hungarian) Manuscript, 2012.
- Árpád Jakosa: The mills. (In Hungarian) Manuscript, 2011.
- János Izsák, Gyula Kummer: Data on the last decades of the mills on Zala river. (In Hungarian) Manuscript, 2011.
- János Izsák: Additional photos and information on research of watermill on Zala. (In Hungarian) Manuscript, 2016.
- Károly Gerse: Contribution of hydropower utilization and EU's plans (in Hungarian). Magyar Tudomány 2014, vol. 175. pp. 779–789.
