= Őriszentpéter =

- Flag Coat of arms

- Location of Őriszentpéter in Hungary
- Coordinates: 46°50′20″N 16°25′16″E
- Country: Hungary
- Region: Western Transdanubia
- County: Vas

Area
  - Total: 33.56 km^{2} (12.96 sq mi)

Population (2004)
  - Total: 1,283
  - Density: 38.23/km^{2} (99.02/sq mi)
- Time zone: UTC+1 (CET)
  - Summer (DST): UTC+2 (CEST)
- Postal code: 6767
- Area code: +36 94
- Website: https://oriszentpeter.hu/

Őriszentpéter (Slovene: Šentpeter) is a town in Vas County, Hungary.

== Geography ==
The town extends on the hills of the region Őrség, where the river Zala flows through. The Zala has its source about 10 kilometres (6 miles) away at Szalafő.

The town has an ancient szer structure. It consists of 9 szer: The central grain is at the river Zala: Városszer and Baksaszer, moreover the Alszer on the northern side. Also important are the Kovácsszer, Siskaszer, Templomszer, Keserűszer and Galambszer districts.

== History ==
The village of Őriszentpéter is first mentioned in chronicles from 1280. The inhabitants of the village were defenders of the border of Hungary on the west frontier. They were free people and served the king of Hungary as soldiers. They built their church in the 12th century. During the Turkish wars the religion changed and the Catholic Church became a Reformed church.

In the 17th century the leading aristocrats of west Hungary, the Batthyány family became the landowner of the region. Őriszentpéter remained a leading village in the vicinity. The building of the railway between Körmend and Muraszombat helped to develop the region. From 2005 it has city rank. Today is the capital of Őrség

After the collapse of the Iron Curtain, the greater traffic of tourism began because of the 3 border status among Austria, Slovenia and Hungary. The new railway in 2000 between Zalalövő and Őrihodos also developed the traffic among the three countries.

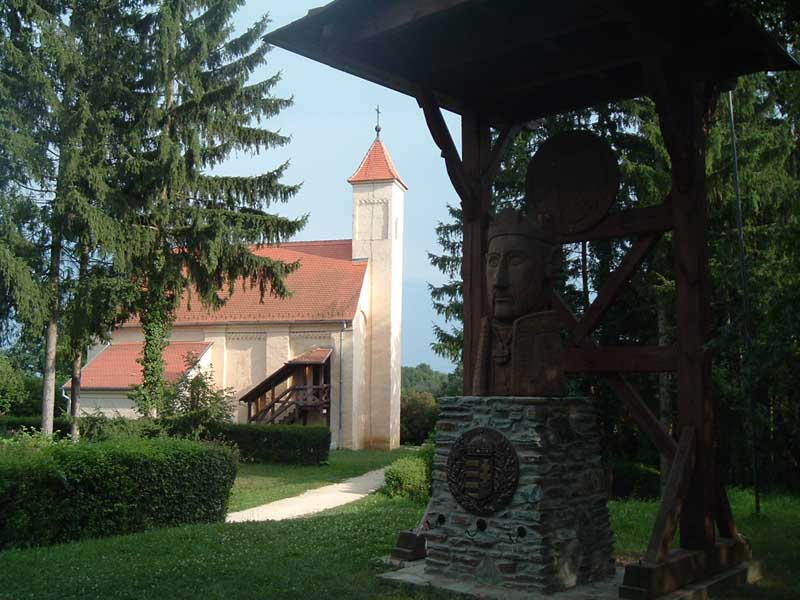
View of the church from north.

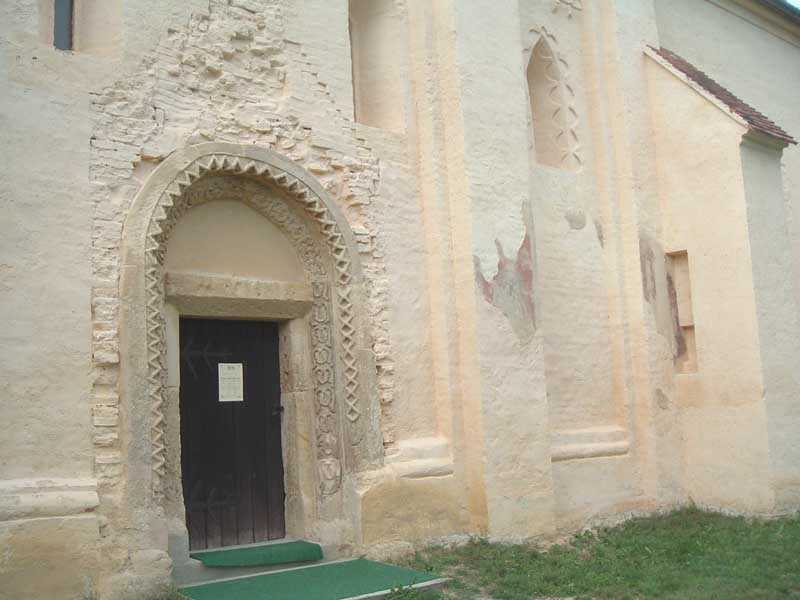
The doorway of the parochial church.

== Sightseeing ==
- Collection of the Őrség Museum
- Városszer reformed church
- Templomszer Roman Catholic Church (Romanesque style)
- Local old peasant houses

== Literature ==
- Dercsényi D. (1959): Árpád-kori műemlékeink Vas megyében. (Árpád Age Architectural Heritage in Vas County). Vasi Szemle 1959. 2. sz.
- Genthon I. (1959): Magyarország műemlékei. I. Dunántúl. (Architectural Heritage of Hungary. I. Transdanubia). Budapest, 1959. 444 p.
- Gerevich T. (1938): Magyarország románkori emlékei. (Die romanische Denkmäler Ungarns.) Egyetemi nyomda. Budapest,
- Henszlmann, I. (1876): Magyarország ó-keresztyén, román és átmeneti stylü mű-emlékeinek rövid ismertetése, (Old-Christian, Romanesque and Transitional Style Architecture in Hungary). Királyi Magyar Egyetemi Nyomda, Budapest
- Valter I. (2005): Árpád-kori téglatemplomok Nyugat-Dunántúlon. (Árpád Age Brick-Churches in Transdanubia, Hungary). Budapest
