= Zala (river) =

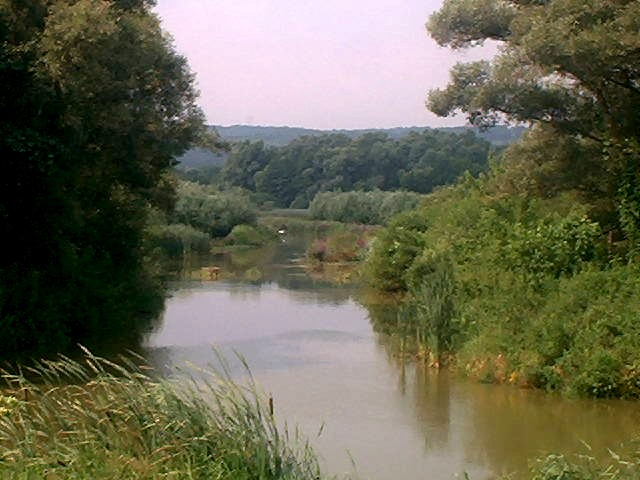

Location
- Country: Hungary

Physical characteristics
- Source
  - location: near Szalafő
- Mouth
  - location: Lake Balaton
  - coordinates: 46.7059°N 17.2646°E
- Length: 139 km (86 mi)
- Basin size: 2,622 km^{2} (1,012 sq mi)

Basin features
- Progression: Lake Balaton→ Sió→ Danube→ Black Sea

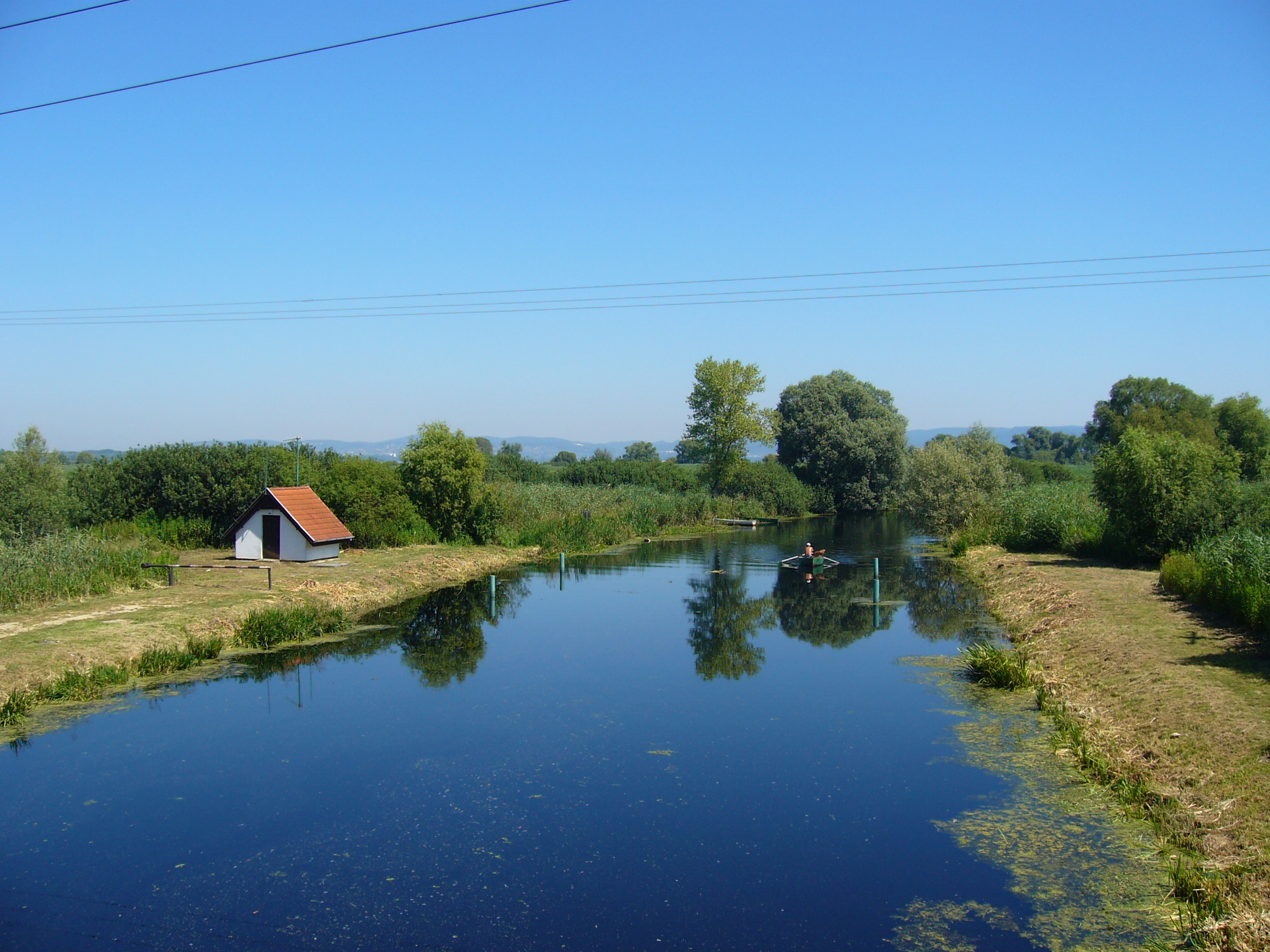
The estuary of Zala river at Balaton Lake, Hungary

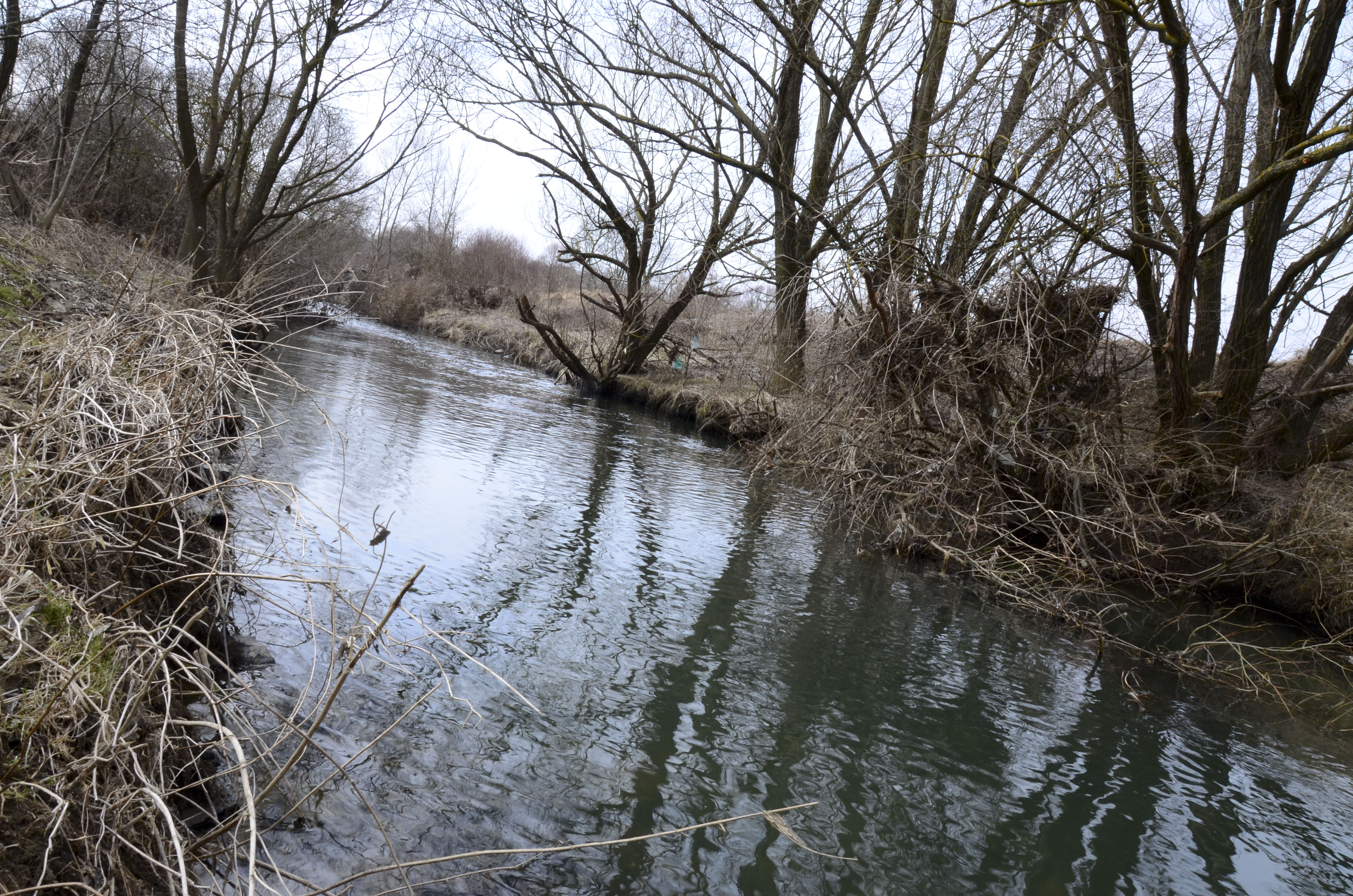
Zala river at Csácsbozsok locale of Zalaegerszeg city, Zala county, Hungary

The Zala is a river in south-western Hungary. Its source is in the hills northwest of Szalafő near the borders with Austria and Slovenia. The 139 kilometres (86 mi) long Zala drains an area of 2,622 km^{2} (1,012 sq mi). Several smaller rivers feed into it, including the Felső-Válicka, Szentmihályfalvai patak (brook), Szévíz csatorna (channel), Foglár csatorna on the right bank, and Szentjakabi patak, Sárvíz (Zala) patak, Széplaki patak, Csörgető patak and Nádas patak on the left bank. It flows through the city of Zalaegerszeg before flowing into Lake Balaton near Keszthely. The River Zala flows through the Hungarian counties of Vas and Zala.

== See also ==
Watermills on Zala River
