= Zalacséb =

Coordinates: 46°52′N 16°40′E

- Village
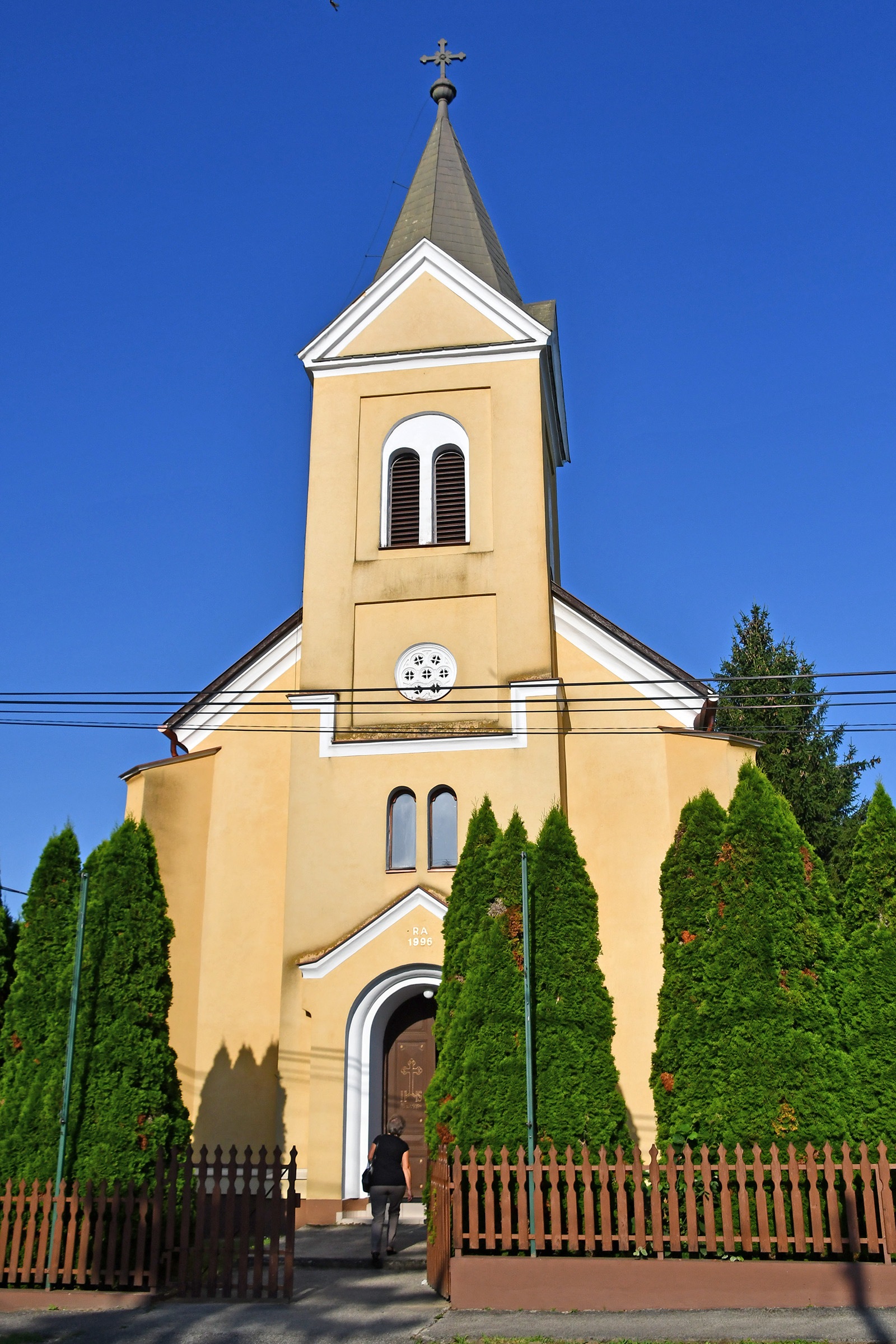
- Roman Catholic church
- Interactive map of Zalacséb
- Country: Hungary
- Region: Western Transdanubia
- County: Zala County
- Time zone: UTC+1 (CET)
  - Summer (DST): UTC+2 (CEST)

Zalacséb is a village in Zala County, Hungary.
