= Kehidakustány =

- Village
- Location within Hungary
- Coordinates: 46°51′N 17°06′E
- Country: Hungary
- Region: Western Transdanubia
- County: Zala County

Government
  - Mayor: István Lázár

Area
  - Total: 763 sq mi (1,975 km^{2})

Population (2013)
  - Total: 1,218
- Time zone: UTC+1 (CET)
  - Summer (DST): UTC+2 (CEST)

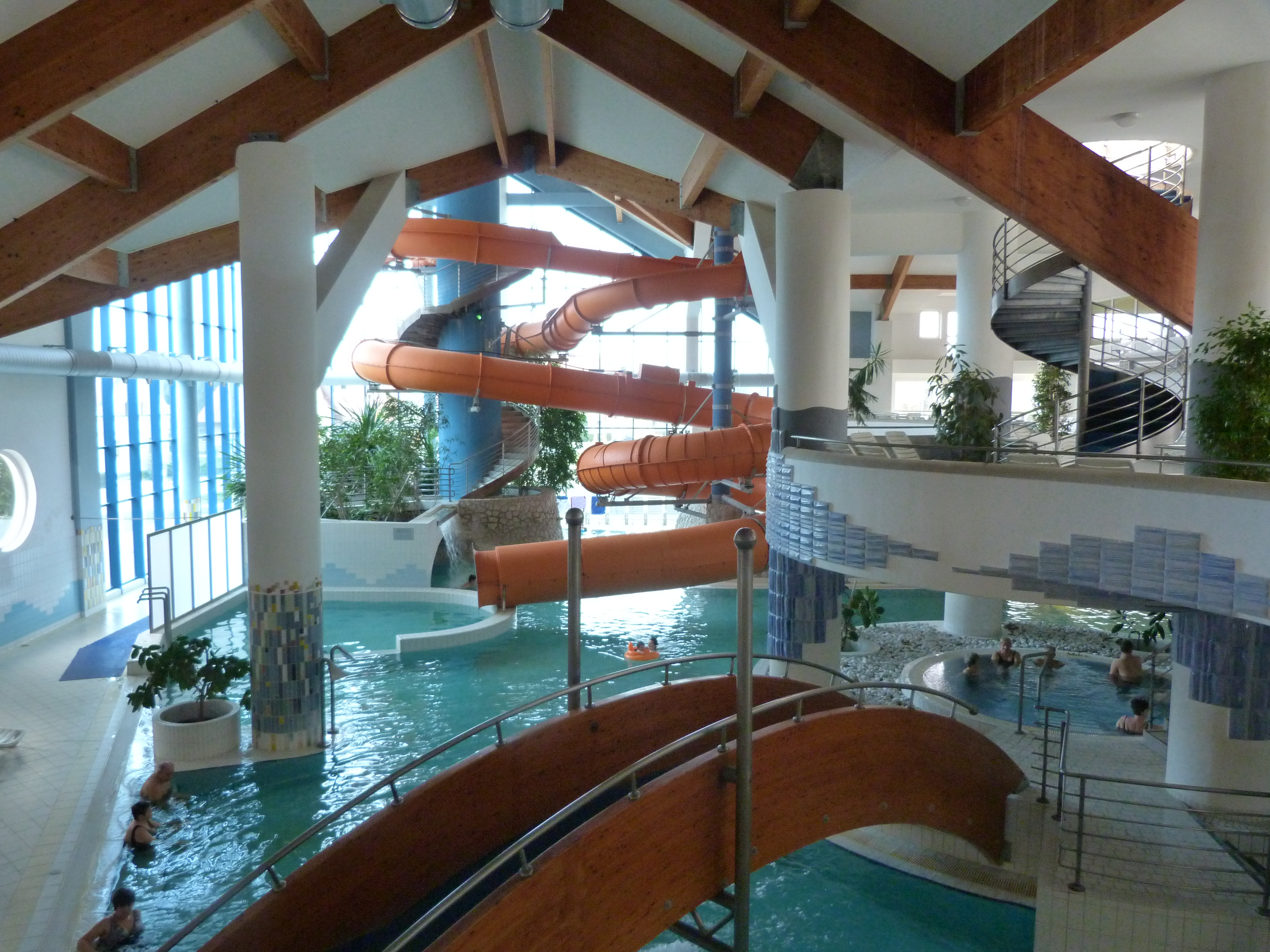
Spa

Kehidakustány is a village in Zala County, Hungary.

== History ==
The area was first settled during the Bronze Age. Later on Celts moved to the area followed by the Avars. Prior to 1941 the town consisted of three different entities, Kehida, Kustány, and Barátsziget.

During the 1960s the population of the town declines as people moved to urban centers. The decline of the population accelerated in the 1970s when the train serving the area was shut down, and the local high school closed in 1977.

The town's economy experienced a boom following the construction and opening of the thermal bath complex. The tourist attraction led to the establishment of new accommodations and services covering the needs of visitors.
