= Zalalövő =

Place in Zala, Hungary

- Town
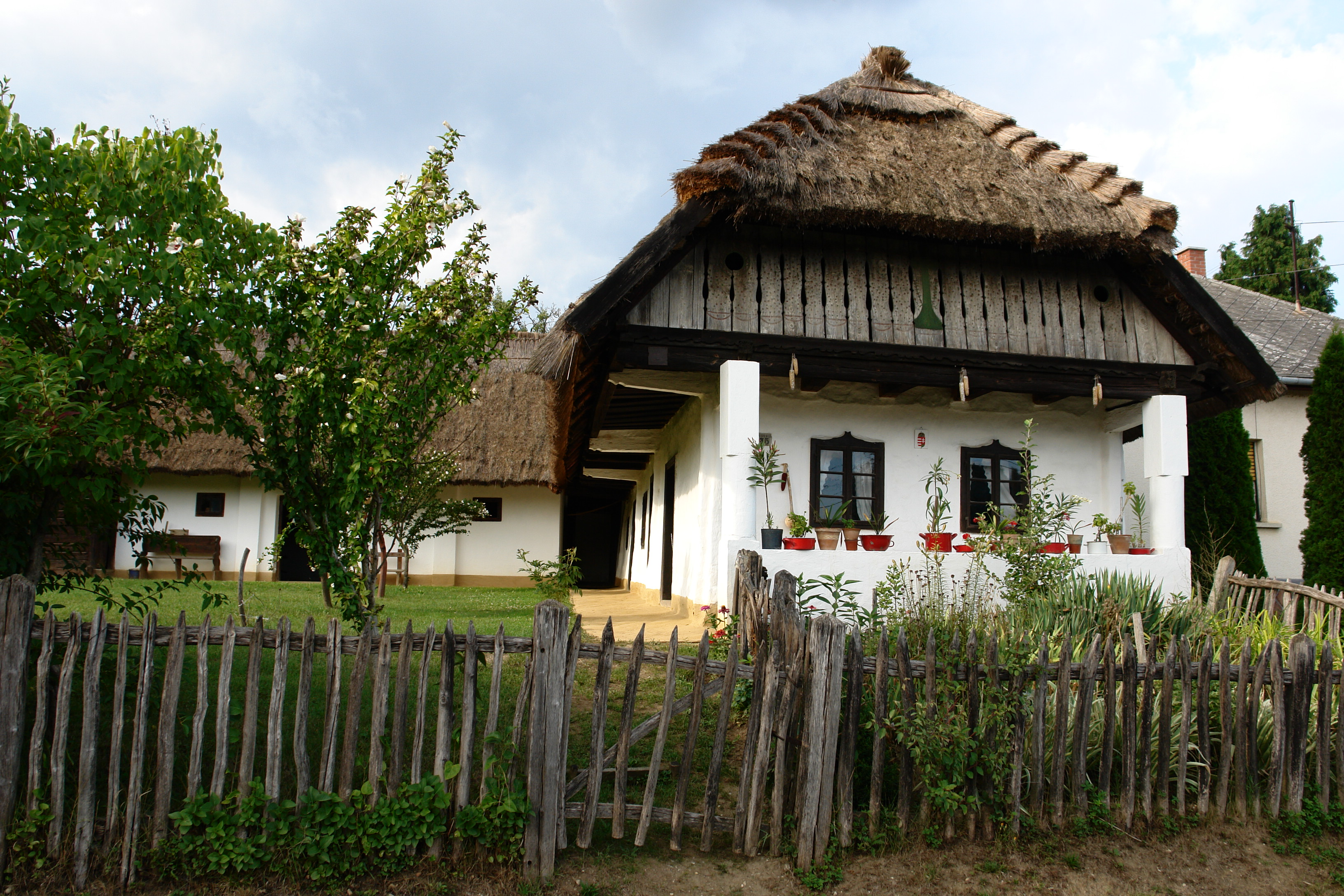

- Flag Coat of arms

- Location of Zalalövő
- Coordinates: 46.84698°N 16.59070°E
- Country: Hungary
- Region: Western Transdanubia
- County: Zala
- District: Zalaegerszeg

Area
  - Total: 52.64 km^{2} (20.32 sq mi)

Population (1 January 2026)
  - Total: 2,674
  - Density: 50.80/km^{2} (131.6/sq mi)
- Time zone: UTC+1 (CET)
  - Summer (DST): UTC+2 (CEST)
- Postal code: 8999
- Area code: (+36) 92
- Website: www.zalalovo.hu

Zalalövő (Latin: Sala) is a town in Zala County, Hungary.

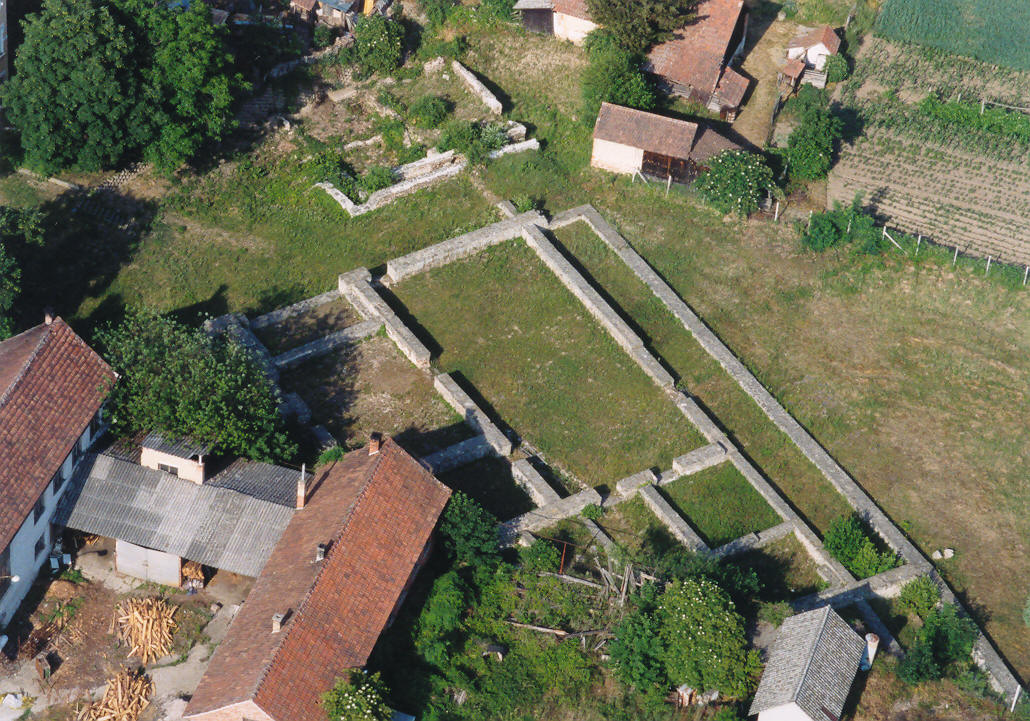
Aerial photo of Zalalövő

== Twin towns ==
Zalalövő is twinned with:

- Oberaich, Austria
- Chibed, Romania
- Farra d'Isonzo, Italy
