= Szalafő =

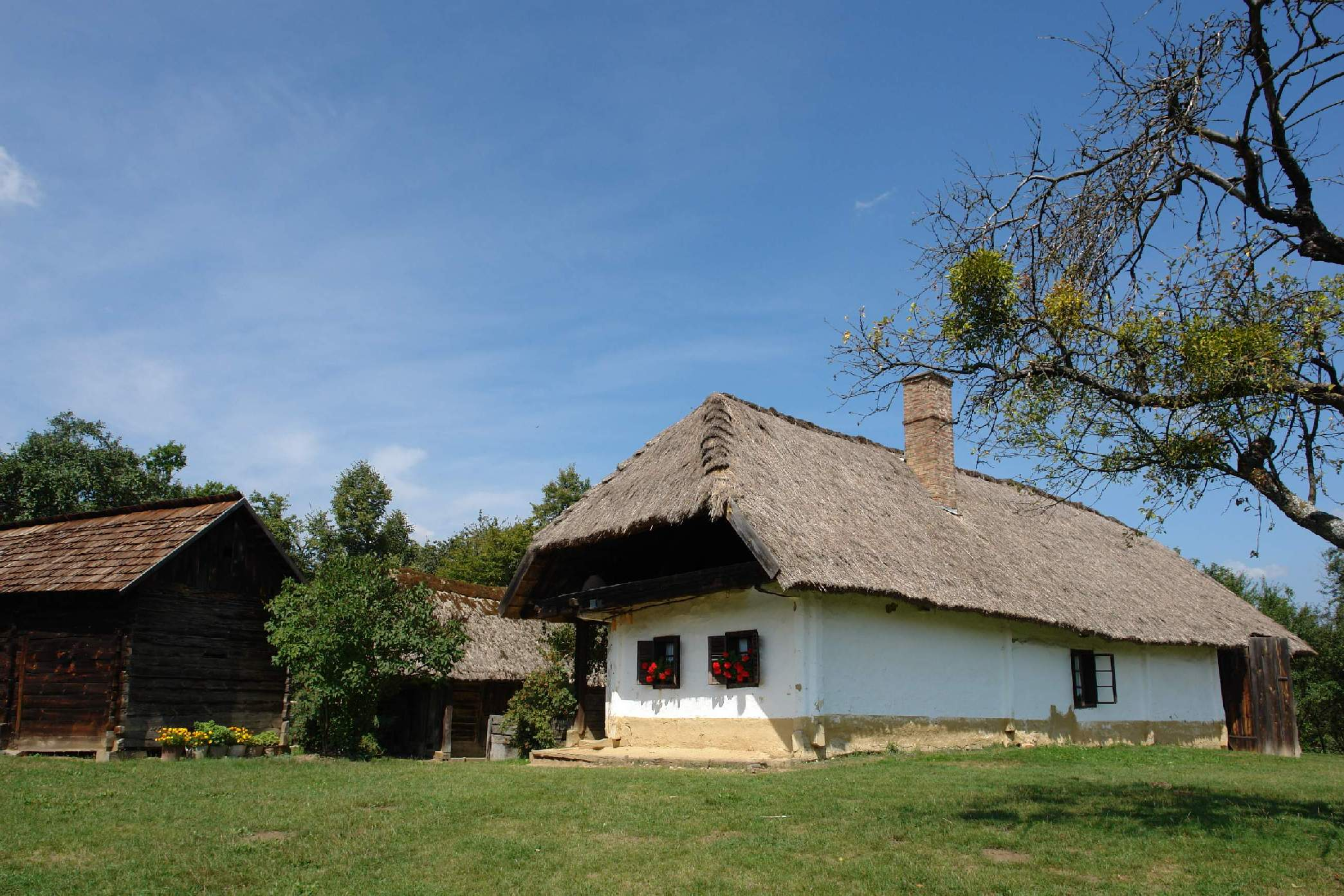

- Location of Szalafő in Hungary
- Coordinates: 46°52′13.37″N 16°21′20.45″E
- Country: Hungary
- Region: Western Transdanubia
- County: Vas
- Subregion: Őriszentpéteri
- Rank: Village

Area
  - Total: 27.37 km^{2} (10.57 sq mi)
- Time zone: UTC+1 (CET)
  - Summer (DST): UTC+2 (CEST)
- Postal code: 9942
- Area code: +36 94
- Website: www.szalafo.hu

Szalafő (Slovene: Sola or Glava Zale) is a village in Vas county, Hungary. It lies near the borders with Austria and Slovenia and close to the source of the Zala River, which is located in the hills northwest of the village.
