= Illyricum (Roman province) =

Roman province from 27 BC to 69/79 AD

Provincia Illyricum ἐπαρχία Ιλλυρίας eparchía Illyrías
- Province of Roman Empire
- 27 BC–69/79 AD
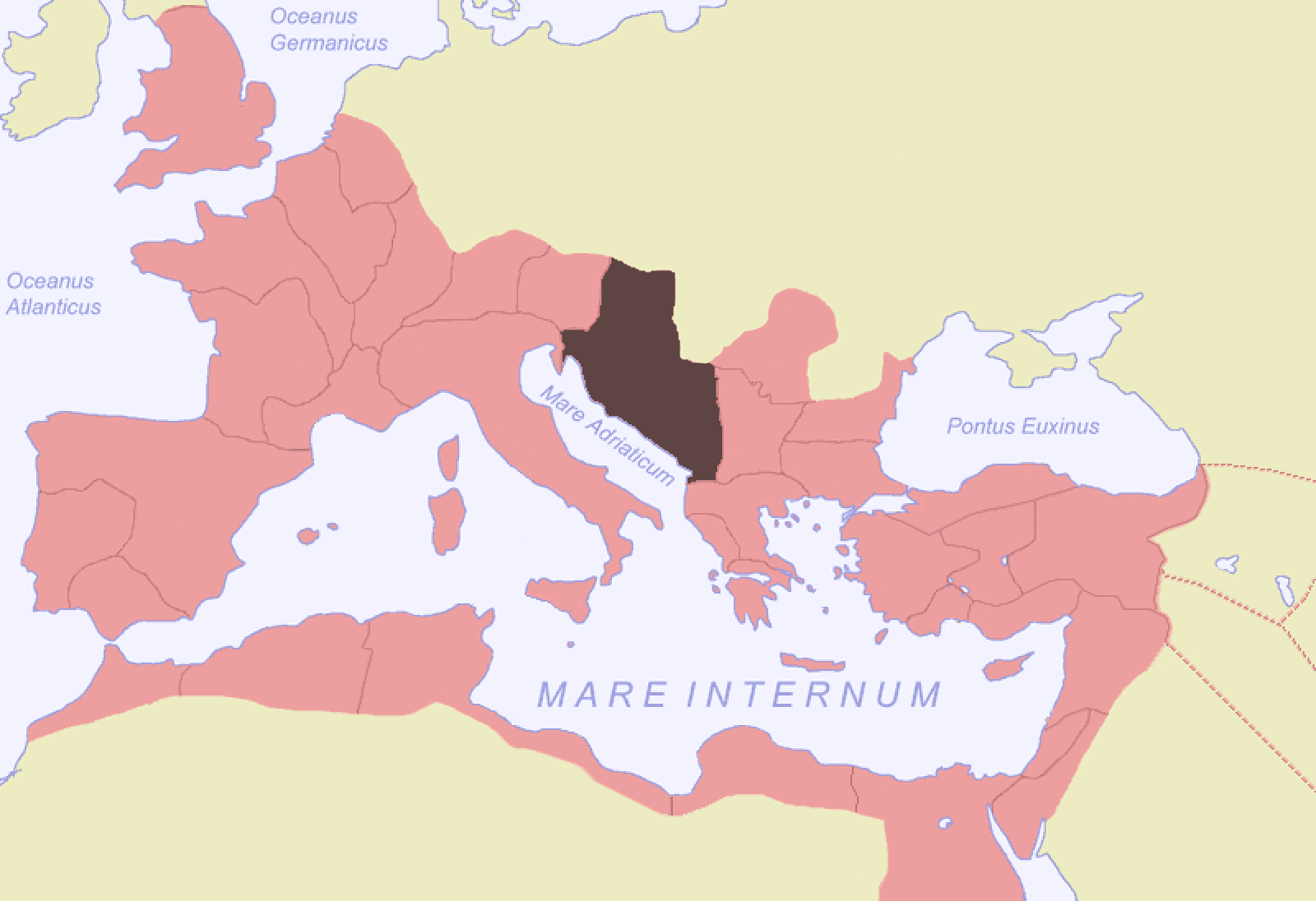
- The Roman Province of Illyricum, encompasing Upper Illyrcum (Dalmatia), and Lower Illyricum (Pannonia)
- Capital: Salona
- Historical era: Antiquity
  - Established: 27 BC
  - Dissolved during the reign of Vespasian; new provinces of Dalmatia and Pannonia created: 69/79 AD
Preceded by	Succeeded by
Illyria	Dalmatia (Roman province); Pannonia

Illyricum /ɪˈlɪrɪkəm/ was a Roman province that existed from 27 BC to sometime during the reign of Vespasian (69–79 AD). The province comprised the regions of Illyria/Dalmatia in the south and Pannonia in the north. Illyria included the area along the east coast of the Adriatic Sea and its inland mountains. Pannonia included the northern plains that now are part of Serbia, Croatia and Hungary. Illyricum included part or all of the territories of today's Albania, Kosovo, Montenegro, Serbia, Bosnia and Herzegovina, Croatia and Slovenia.

== Name and etymology ==
The term Illyrians was used to describe the inhabitants of the area as far back as the late 6th century BC by Hecataeus of Miletus.

== Geography ==
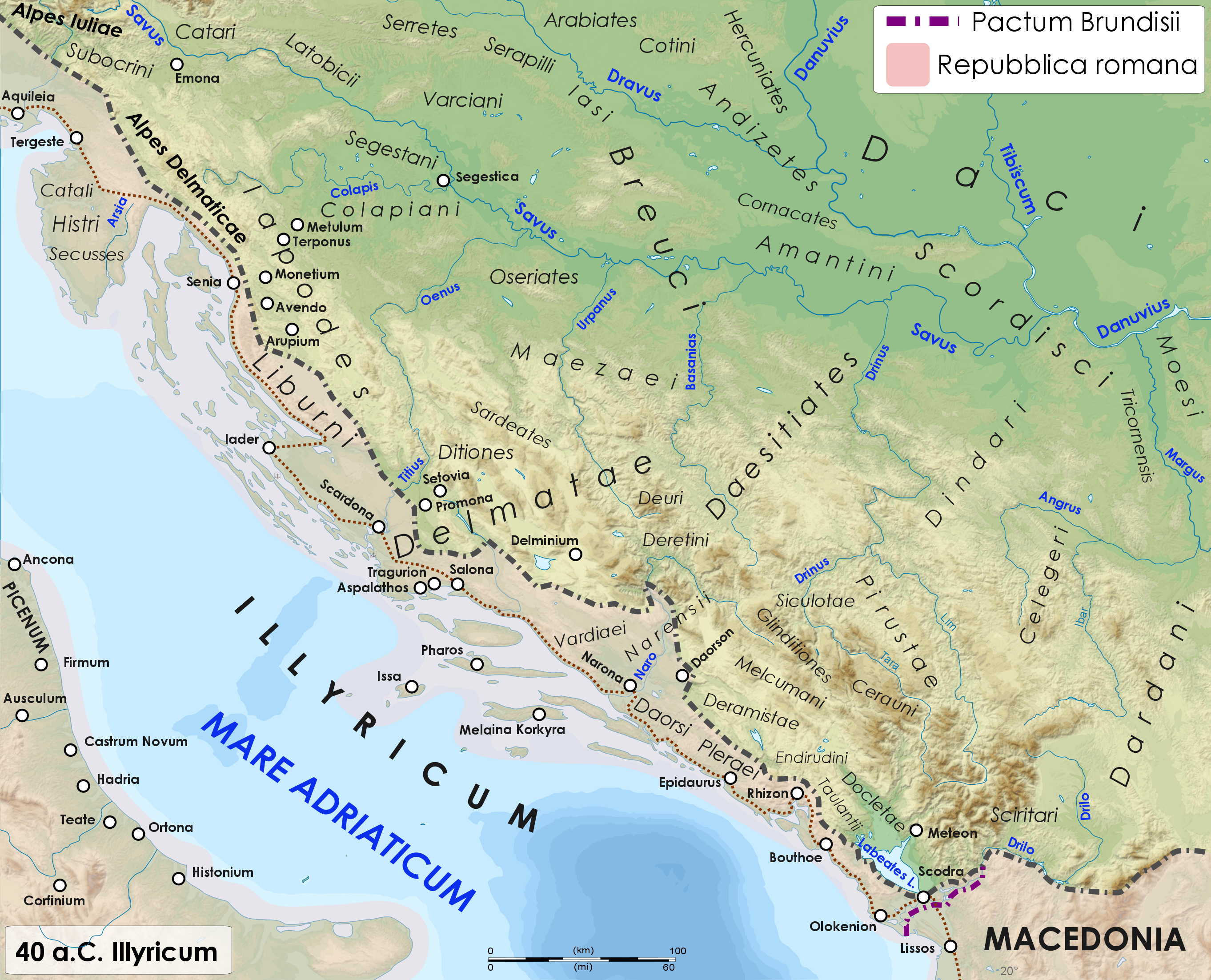
Roman Illyricum following the Illyrian wars.

Illyria/Dalmatia stretched from the River Drin (in modern northern Albania) to Istria (Croatia) and the River Sava in the north. The area roughly corresponded to modern northern Albania, Kosovo, Serbia, Slovenia, Montenegro, Bosnia and Herzegovina and coastal Croatia (Dalmatiae). Pannonia was the plain which lies to its north, from the mountains of Illyria/Dalmatia to the westward bend of the River Danube, and included modern Vojvodina (in modern northern Serbia), northern Croatia and western Hungary. As the province developed, Salona (near modern Split, Croatia) became its capital.

Illyria stretched from the River Drilon (Drin) in modern northern Albania and the Danube in the north. It comprised the coastal plain, the mountains of the Dinaric Alps which stretch along the eastern coast of the Adriatic Sea for 645 kilometres (401 miles) with a width of about 150 kilometres) and, in the north-west, the Istrian Peninsula. There were numerous islands off the coast, but they lacked drinking water. The mountains were cultivated towards the coast, but for the most they were barren. Lack of water and poor or arid soil made much of Illyria poor agricultural area and this gave rise to piracy. The interior of the southern part of Illyricum (central and southern Albania) was more fertile. Illyria was inhabited by dozens of independent tribes and tribal groupings. Most of them were labelled as Illyrians. In the north there were also Celtic tribes. The Pannonian (or Carpathian) plain in the north was more fertile. Its tribes were labelled as Pannonian. Archaeological finds and toponyms show that the Pannonians differed culturally from the Illyrians and the eastern Celts who lived to their west, in what is now Austria. They were later Celticised following a Celtic invasion of the northern part of the region at the beginning of the 4th century BC. Some tribes in the area (the Eravisci, Scordisci Cotini, Boii, and Anartii) were Celtic. The Pannonians also had cultural similarities with the Illyrians. Iron mining and production was an important part of their economy in the pre-Roman days.

== Historical background ==
=== Illyrian Wars ===
The Romans fought three Illyrian wars between 229 BC and 168 BC. The First Illyrian War (229–228 BC) broke out due to concerns about attacks on the ships of Rome's Italian confederates in the Adriatic Sea by Illyrian pirates and the increased power of the Ardiaei (an Illyrian tribe in today's Montenegro and northern Albania). With a powerful fleet the Ardiaei had invaded the Greek cities of Epidamnos (modern Durrës, Albania) Pharos (Stari Grad, Croatia), the island of Corfu and attacked Elis and Messenia in the Peloponnese and Phoenice in Epirus, a hub of Roman trade. Numerous attacks on Italian ships prompted Rome to intervene. The Romans freed the Greek cities and attacked the Ardiaei. Peace terms were agreed. In 220 BC the Ardiaei carried out attacks on the Greek coast in the west, south and southeast. They then attacked Roman allies in southern Illyria. This led to the Second Illyrian War (219–18 BC), which Rome won. In 168 BC, during the Third Macedonian War (171–168 BC) between Rome and the Kingdom of Macedon, the Ardiaei joined the fight against the Romans, but they were quickly defeated (Third Illyrian War, 168 BC). The Romans imposed a tribute equivalent to half the taxes paid to the now deposed king, excluding the cities and tribe which had allied with them.

=== From the Illyrian Wars to the Roman Civil Wars ===
In 156 BC the Dalmatae made an attack of the Illyrian subjects of Rome (this source by Appian is considered ambiguous) and refused to see Roman ambassadors. The consul Gaius Marcius Figulus undertook a campaign against them. While he was preparing his camp the Dalmatae overpowered his guards and drove him out of the camp. He fled through the plain as far as the river Naro. He then hoped to catch the Dalmatae unawares as they went back home for the winter, but they had assembled because they had heard of his arrival. Still, he drove them into the city of Delminium. He could not attack this strongly fortified town. Thus he attacked other towns which were partly deserted because of the Dalmatae concentrating their forces at Delminium. He then returned to Delminium and catapulted flaming projectiles damaging and burning significant parts of the town. Livy's Periochae recorded the campaign of Gaius Marcius Figulus and noted that in the next year, 155 BC, the consul Scipio Nasica Corculum subdued the Dalmatae.

In 135 BC two Illyrian tribes, the Ardiaei and the Palarii, raided Roman Illyria while the Romans were busy with the Numantine War in Hispania and the First Servile War in Sicily. The Romans sent ambassadors, but they refused to negotiate. The Romans levied an army of 10,000 infantry and 600 cavalry. The Illyrians sent ambassadors to plea for pardon. Rome asked for indemnities for the people who had been attacked. Since the Illyrians were slow to respond, the consul Servius Fulvius Flaccus marched against them. According to Appian this was only a minor expedition. It is likely that by Roman Illyria Appian meant four coastal towns which had a large Roman population.

In 129 BC the consul Gaius Sempronius Tuditanus and Tiberius Pandusa waged a war with the Iapydes who lived on the Alps (in the north of Illyria), and seemed to have subjugated them. However, according to Livy, Sempronius Tuditanus was at first unsuccessful, "but the defeat was compensated by a victory won through the qualities of Decimus Junius Brutus (the man who had subdued Lusitania)." Tuditanus was granted a triumph. He immortalized his victories with a dedication to the river god Timavus in Aquileia which bore a victory inscription in Saturnian verse, two fragments of which were found in 1906.

In a passage Appian wrote that in 119 BC the consul Lucius Caecilius Metellus Dalmaticus waged war against the Dalmatae even though they had not done anything wrong because he wanted a triumph. They received him as a friend and he wintered among them at the town of Salona. He returned to Rome and was awarded a triumph. In another passage he noted "Lucius Cotta (the other consul for that year) and Caecilius Metellus seemed to have subjugated the Segestani. He also noted that both the Iapydes and the Segestani revolted again shortly afterward. Caecilius Metellus was given the agnomen Dalmanticus,

In 115 BC the consul Marcus Aemilius Scaurus, conducted operations in Gallia Cisalpina against the Ligures in the west and against the Carni and Taurisci (two Gallic tribes which lived in today's Slovenia) in the east.

In 113 BC the consul Gnaeus Papirius Carbo was sent to face an invasion by the Cimbri (a Germanic tribe) which had entered into Illyricum and then into Noricum. He was defeated at the Battle of Noreia in Noricum.

In 78–76 BC a certain Gaius Cosconius was sent into Illyricum as proconsul. He fought there for two years, reduced a great part of Dalmatia and seized Salona (near today's Solin, near Split, Croatia), one of the major towns in Dalmatia. Later the Roman settlement of Colonia Martia Iulia Salona was founded, probably after the Roman civil wars.

=== Caesar's governorship ===
In 59 BC the lex Vatinia assigned to the consul, Julius Caesar, the proconsulship of Gallia Cisalpina (in northern Italy) and Illyricum and the command of three legions based at Aquileia for a period of five years. When the proconsul of Gallia Narbonensis died, the senate also gave Caesar the proconsulship of that province and the command on a legion which was stationed there, also for five years.

Caesar took on his proconsulships in 58 BC. Only Gallia Narbonensis was a province in the sense of a formal administrative unit. The other two were provinces in the sense of areas of military command which were assigned to high military commanders in areas where there were rebellions or threats of attacks. In the past Liguria (which often rebelled), Bruttium (today's Calabria, where there was a chance of unrest) and Gallia Cisalpina (in case of rebellions or possible invasions) had been assigned as provinces in this sense. Aquileia was a Roman town in north-eastern Italy which was founded in 180/181 BC as an outpost to defend northern Italy against hostile and warlike peoples to the east: the Carni (Gauls who lived on the mountains of Noricum), the Taurisci (a federation of Gallic tribes which lived in today's Carniola, northern Slovenia), the Histri (a Venetic tribe, with ties with Illyrians which lived in the Istrian peninsula), and the Iapydes who lived east of Istrian Peninsula and inland from the Liburnians; the latter lived on a stretch of the Adriatic coast south of the Istrian peninsula and between the rivers Arsia (Raša) and Titius (Krka). The Carni settled in their area around 186 BC, invaded the plain on north-eastern Italy and founded the fortified town of Akileja. The Romans forced the Carni back to the mountains. They destroyed their settlement and founded Aquileia nearby, which was named after Akileja. It was also about 6 km from where an estimated 12,000 Taurisci had tried to settle in 183 BC. For the foundation of Aquileia 3,000 families were settled there. In 169 BC 1,500 more families were settled there. This settlement was grown into a sizable town and three legions were stationed there because of its strategic importance for the defence of northern Italy.

The fact that Cisalpine Gaul and Illyricum were the areas of command initially assigned to Caesar could indicate that Caesar had an eye on Illyricum to attain military glory with which he could bolster his political clout in Rome. Burebista had led the Dacians from what is today's Romania to the conquest of the Hungarian Plain west of the River Danube and close to Illyricum and Italy. However, Burebista stopped, returned to Transylvania and turned his attention eastwards. Caesar's attention turned to troubles in Gaul and then he embarked on his Gallic Wars (58–50 BC). After the defeat of the Belgae of northern Gaul in 57 BC Caesar thought that Gaul was at peace and went to Illyricum to visit the country and to acquaint himself with it. However, war broke out in Gaul again and he went back there. When he went to Gallia Cisalpina in 54 BC to winter there he heard that the Illyrian tribe of the Pirustae raided nearby territories. He went to Illyricum and levied troops from Illyrian peoples. The Pirustae claimed that none of the raids were due to public decisions and offered compensation. Caesar asked for hostages and said that if they were not handed over he would wage war. The Pirustae complied and Caesar appointed arbitrators to assess the damages done to the other peoples and set a penalty. He returned to Italy and then went to Gaul.

=== Illyricum during Caesar's Civil War ===
Appian wrote that while Caesar was in Gaul the Dalmatae seized Promona from the Liburnians, who appealed to Caesar. The Dalmatae refused his request to leave the city and he sent a strong detachment. However, it was routed. Caesar did not pursue the matter further because he was occupied with his civil war. This suggests that this event occurred in late 50 BC, just before the beginning of this war.

In January 49 BC Caesar started a civil war against the forces of the senate led by Pompey. Pompey fled to Greece to gather forces to fight the war. He controlled the Roman navy. Still, in 48 BC Caesar managed to sail his troops across the Adriatic Sea and land at Palaeste (Palasë, southern Albania). Marcus Octavius, one of Pompey's admirals, went to Salona (Solin, near Split, Croatia) with his fleet. He persuaded the people of the island of Issa (Vis, Croatia) to defect to him. He failed to persuade the Romans in Salona and surrounded it with five camps to besiege it. The town was short of grain and sent envoys to Caesar to ask for help. As the siege continued the inhabitants stormed the nearest camp. Then they seized the other four and killed many of the enemy. Octavius was forced to withdraw to his ships and as the winter was approaching he sailed back to Dyrrachium (Durrës, Albania) to rejoin Pompey.

In the summer 48 BC Caesar sent Quintus Cornificius to Illyricum as a quaestor. This region had been quiet. However, now the Romans in the local towns supported Caesar while the natives supported Pompey. Caesar wrote that the area was quite poor and could barely support an army. Moreover, it was exhausted due to the fighting in the Battle of Dyrrachium between Caesar and Pompey in the south of the region (in July 48 BC) and due to rebellions. Cornificius defended Illyria and recovered it for Caesar. He stormed several mountain strongholds which were used for carrying out raids. When Marcus Octavius took refuge on the Illyrian coast after the Battle of Pharsalus (in Greece, where Caesar defeated Pompey in August 48 BC), Cornificius, with the help of the people of Iadera (Zadar (Croatia) who were loyal to Caesar, scattered his ships and added those he captured to those of his Illyrian allies, thus assembling a small fleet. Since the many Pompeian soldiers had taken refuge in Illyricum after the mentioned battle, Caesar ordered Aulus Gabinius to go to Illyricum with his force, join Cornificius and repulse any enemy operations in the region. If larger forces were needed for this, he was to go to Greece, where continued resistance was to be expected. Gabinius marched in the winter. He did not get supplies for his army because the locals were hostile and because storms in the Adriatic Sea held back supply ships. Gabinius had to storm towns and strongholds in adverse weather and suffered reverses. He had to retreat to Salona, on the coast, which had many Roman inhabitants. On his way he was attacked and routed, losing 2,000 soldiers. He went to Salona with the remnants of his force. He fell ill and died a few months later. Appian wrote that Aulus Gabinius led fifteen cohorts (which would amount to about 7,800 soldiers) and 3,000 cavalry and that, again, being busy with the civil war, Caesar did not pursue the matter further.

Marcus Octavius sought to take advantage of this to seize Illyria. Cornificius asked Publius Vatinius, who was in Brundisium (Brindisi, southern Italy), to come to his aid and informed him that Octavius was making alliances with the locals and attacking Caesarian garrisons, sometimes with his fleet and sometimes with land forces, using native troops—the Caesarians were Caesar's supporters. Vatinius asked a Caesarian lieutenant in Greece to send him a fleet, but this was taking too long. He armed some civilian ships whose size was poorly suited for fighting and added them to the few warships he had and left for Illyria. He did not pursue Octavius so as not to be delayed. Instead, he recovered some coastal towns which had sided with Octavius and by-passed others, proceeding as quickly as he could. In this way he managed to force Octavius to abandon his attack on Epidaurus (Epidaurum in Latin, modern Cavtat, near Dubrovnik, Croatia) with his approach. Octavius thought that his fleet was superior to the small ships of Vatinius and sailed to the island of Tauris. Vatinius pursued him without knowing that he had gone to that island. While the sea was rough he was caught unawares when the fleet of Octavius appeared ready for battle and was superior in formation. Vatinius decided to try his luck and attacked first, charging Octavius' flagship with one of his warships. The crush was hard and the ram of the latter was smashed away. The battle was fought at close range in narrow sea. Vatinius had the better and at nightfall the remnants of the enemy fleet fled. The next day Vatinius refitted his ships and 85 captured ships and the day after that he set off for the island of Issa (Vis, Croatia), thinking that Octavius had retreated there. When he got there the islanders surrendered and told him that Octavius had left for Sicily. Having cleared the Adriatic Sea, he returned to Brundisium.

In 45 BC Caesar was planning a war against Parthia. The Illyrians, feared punishment again (this time for routing Aulus Gabinius) because Caesar was going to cross the south of their land to reach Parthia. They sent envoys to Rome to ask Caesar for an alliance. Caesar replied that he could not make friends because of what they had done, but that he would grant pardon if they paid a tribute and handed over hostages. They agreed and Publius Vatinius was sent to impose a light tribute and receive the hostages with three legions and a large cavalry unit. After the murder of Caesar in 44 BC and the ensuing instability in Rome, the Illyrians no longer feared Roman power. They ignored Vatinius and when he tried to use force they routed five cohorts led by Baebius, one of his lieutenants, who also died. Vatinius fled to Dyrrhachium (Durrës, Albania). Once more Caesar did not pursue the matter further. In Appian's opinion, Caesar had put off dealing with the Illyrians resolutely for fourteen years because of his Gallic Wars, his civil war and his planned war with Parthia even though he had given the command over Illyria as well as the two Gauls for ten years, and despite having wintered there. This was even regardless of the fact that at times the Illyrians plundered north-eastern Italy.

The assassination of Julius Caesar in 44 BC led to a conflict between the leaders of the plot murder him, Marcus Junius Brutus, and Gaius Cassius Longinus, and the Caesarians led by the Second Triumvirate which took charge of Rome. This led to the Liberator's Civil War (43–42 BC). Before this civil war Brutus and Cassius fled to the east. They had been assigned the Roman provinces of Macedonia (Greece) and Syria respectively by Caesar. However, the Caesarians had the two provinces reassigned to Gaius Antonius (the brother of Mark Antony) and Publius Cornelius Dolabella respectively. They were Caesarians. Brutus and Cassius were given Creta et Cyrenaica instead. They were unhappy with being given this small province and prepared to invade Macedonia and Syria. However, the senate then voted to restore the two provinces to them. Brutus was also assigned Illyria. He arrived in Macedonia when Gaius Antonius had just arrived there to take up his propraetorship which had been assigned to him prior to the change made by the senate. His predecessor, Quintus Hortenius, joined Brutus. Vatinius marched on Dyrrachium and seized it before Brutus got there. However, the soldiers of his three legions (minus the lost cohorts), who disliked him, defected to Brutus, who then went on to engage Gaius Antonius who was in Apollonia (near Fier, Albania). He won over the troops of Antonius (his seven cohorts and a legion under his lieutenant, Lucius Piso) as well.

=== The campaigns of Octavian in Illyricum (35–33 BC) ===
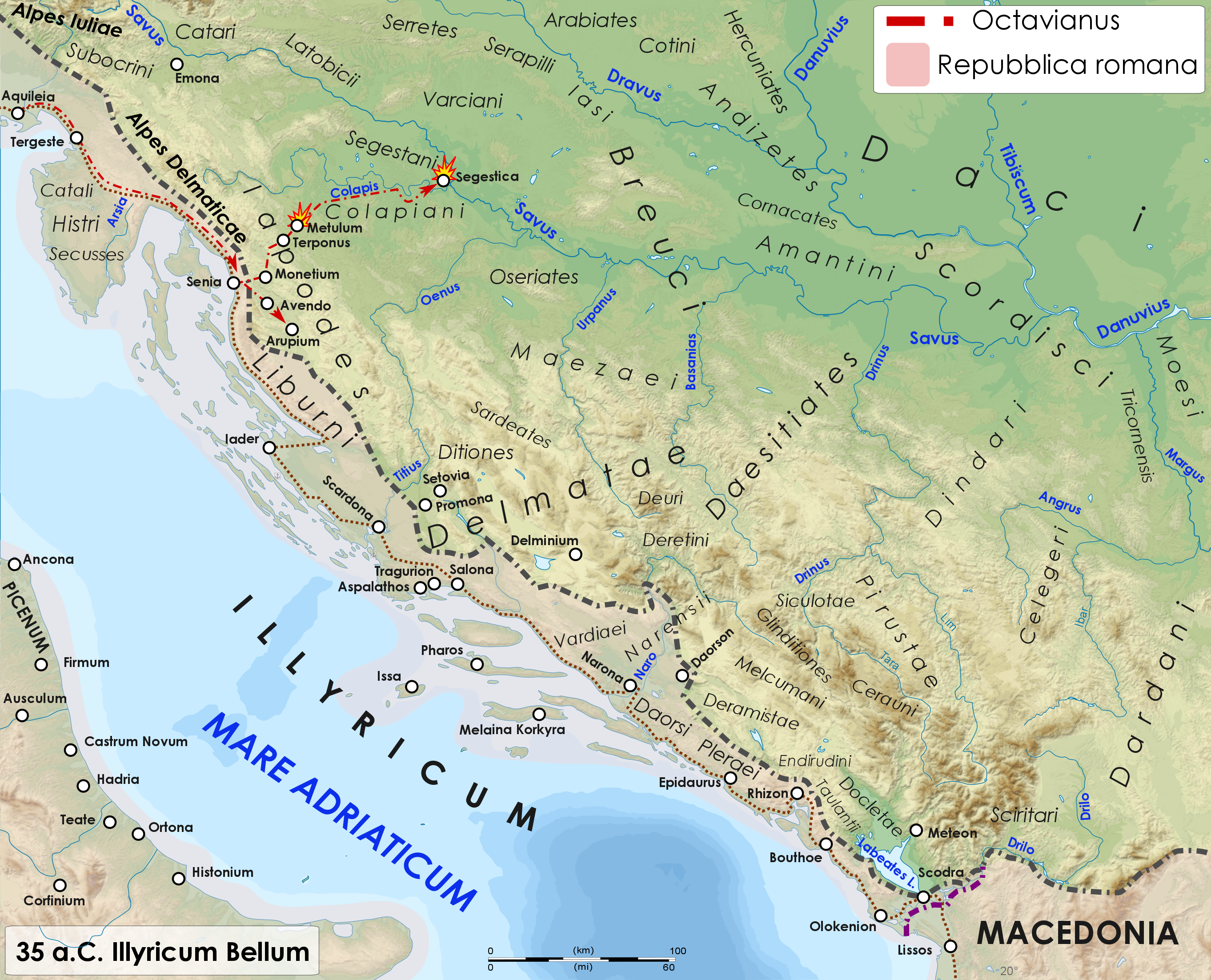
Roman war in Illyricum 35 BC

Caesar's Civil War, the Liberators' Civil War and the resistance against the second triumvirate which Sextus Pompey (the son of Pompey the Great) conducted from Sicily with a powerful fleet (the Sicilian Revolt, 44–36 BC) caused instability in Illyria, neighbouring north-eastern Italy and the Adriatic Sea. The Iapydes carried out raids on north-eastern Italy. There was also a problem with piracy. After these conflicts ended Octavian undertook a series of campaigns in Illyricum. Velleius Paterculus wrote that just before the Sicilian Revolt Octavian made frequent expeditions in "Illyricum and Dalmatia" in order not to keep his troops idle and to battle-harden them. However, it is likely that these campaigns were also linked to the instability of the region. Cassius Dio noted in passim that in 39 BC Gaius Asinius Pollio suppressed a rebellion of the Parthini after a few battles.

In 35 BC Octavian campaigned against the Iapydes who had carried out raids against Aquileia, plundered Tergestus (Trieste) and had destroyed Pola (Pula) in the previous year. He marched along a steep and rugged road. The Iapydes hid in the woods and ambushed him. However, Octavian had sent contingents to occupy the ridges on both sides of the road. These descended on them and defeated them. They then abandoned the town of Terponus and fled to the thickets. Octavian seized the city, but did not burn it, hoping that they would surrender, which they did. He then advanced on Metulus (near Ogulin), which was the main town of the Iapydes. It was defended by 3,000 men who defeated the Romans who surrounded the walls. Octavian began a full siege. When its battered walls begun to crumble the Metulians built another one inside. The Romans burnt the abandoned wall and built a mound by the second one and threw four bridges on top of it. Octavian ordered some if his men to go to the back of the town to divert attention. The enemy destroyed three of the bridges. Since his soldiers panicked, Octavian crossed the bridge together with Agrippa and Hiero, two of his lieutenants, and one of his bodyguards. The soldiers followed suit. The bridge fell under their weight. Octavian was injured in the right leg and in both arms. He had more bridges built. This determination discouraged the Metulians, who surrendered. The next day they sent messengers who offered to give fifty hostages and promised to receive a garrison and to assign to the Romans the highest hills while they would occupy the lower ones. When the garrison entered and ordered them to lay down their arms they shut their wives and children in their council chamber and placed guards with orders to set fire to the building if they lost the fight they decided to undertake. They attacked from the lower positions and they were routed. The guards set fire to the council chamber. Many of the women killed themselves and their children while others jumped into the fire holding their children. The city burned completely. The rest of the Iapydes surrendered and came under Roman subjection for the first time. Octavian left and the Poseni rebelled. Marcus Helvius was sent against them. He conquered them, executed the leaders of the revolt and sold the rest into slavery.

Octavian marched on the Segestani, a Pannonian tribe which had been defeated by the Romans twice but were not asked for hostages and rebelled. He advanced against them through Pannonian territory which was not under the subjection of the Romans. The enemy took to the woods and ambushed the stragglers of the army. Octavian spared the fields hoping for a voluntary surrender. Since this did not happen he ravaged the country for eight days until he reached their town, Segesta, on the River Sava. It was strongly protected by the river and a ditch. Octavian wanted to use it as a base for a campaign against the Dacians and the Bastarnae on the other side of the River Danube. Burebista had previously led them in an invasion across the Danube but then returned homeland (Dacia, in today's Romania) and campaigned to its east. Octavian must have thought that there was a danger of another invasion which would destabilise the area. Alternatively, they might have been launching raids across the river. Octavian built a fleet on the Sava to bring provisions to the Danube. When he approached the city he told the Segestani envoys that he wanted a garrison in the town and as much food as they could supply. The leaders acquiesced. The people were angry but consented to giving hostages from the notable families. When the troops came they shut the city gates and manned the walls. Augustus built a bridge over the river and besieged the town. He ambushed some Pannonians who were coming to its aid, killing some of them and putting the rest to flight. The siege lasted thirty days. Augustus only imposed a fine. He placed a garrison of twenty-five cohorts (roughly two and a half legions) and returned to Rome, intending to return in the spring. Later, as a Roman town, Segesta was called Siscia. It is now modern Sisak in Croatia.

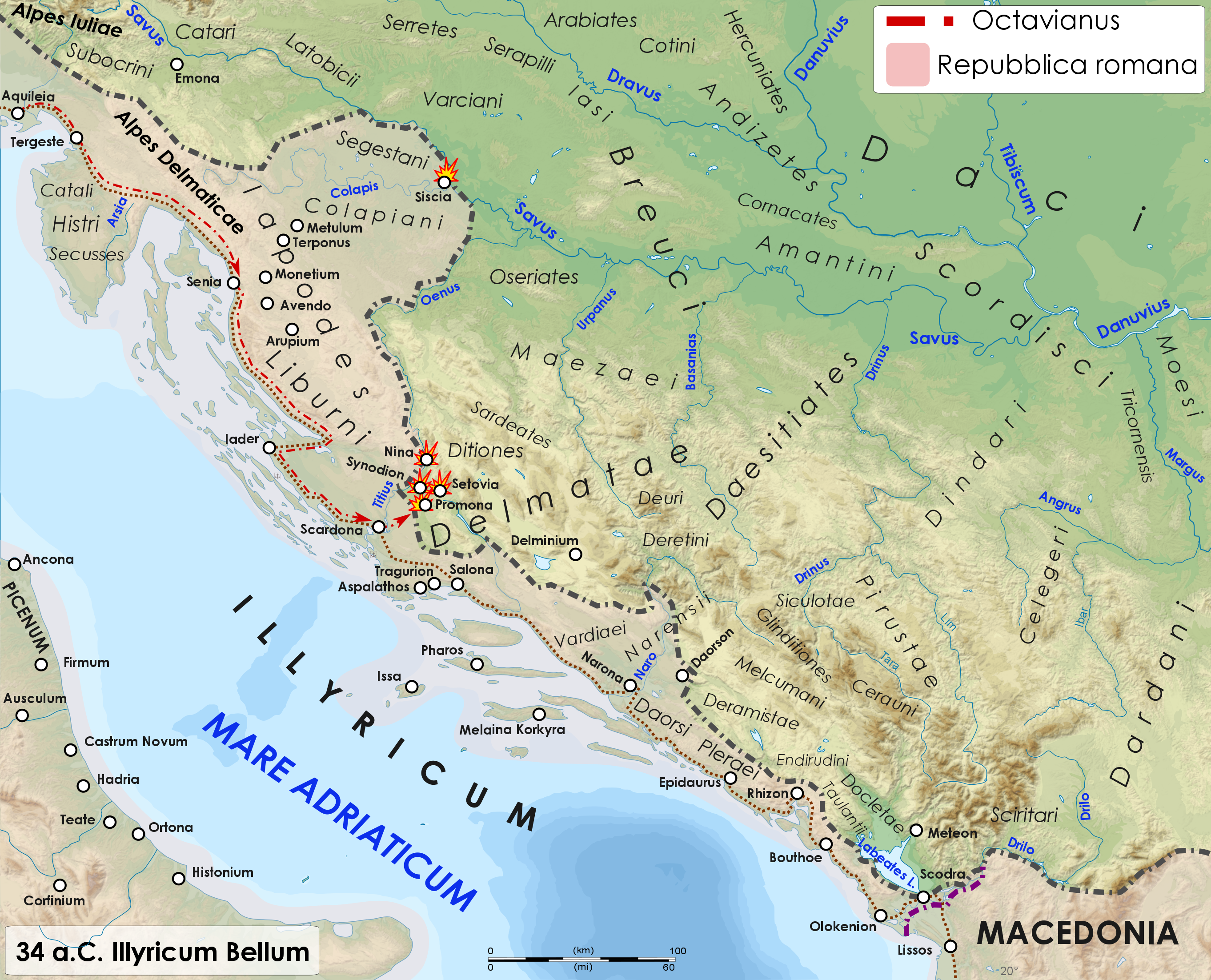
Roman war in Illyricum 34 BC

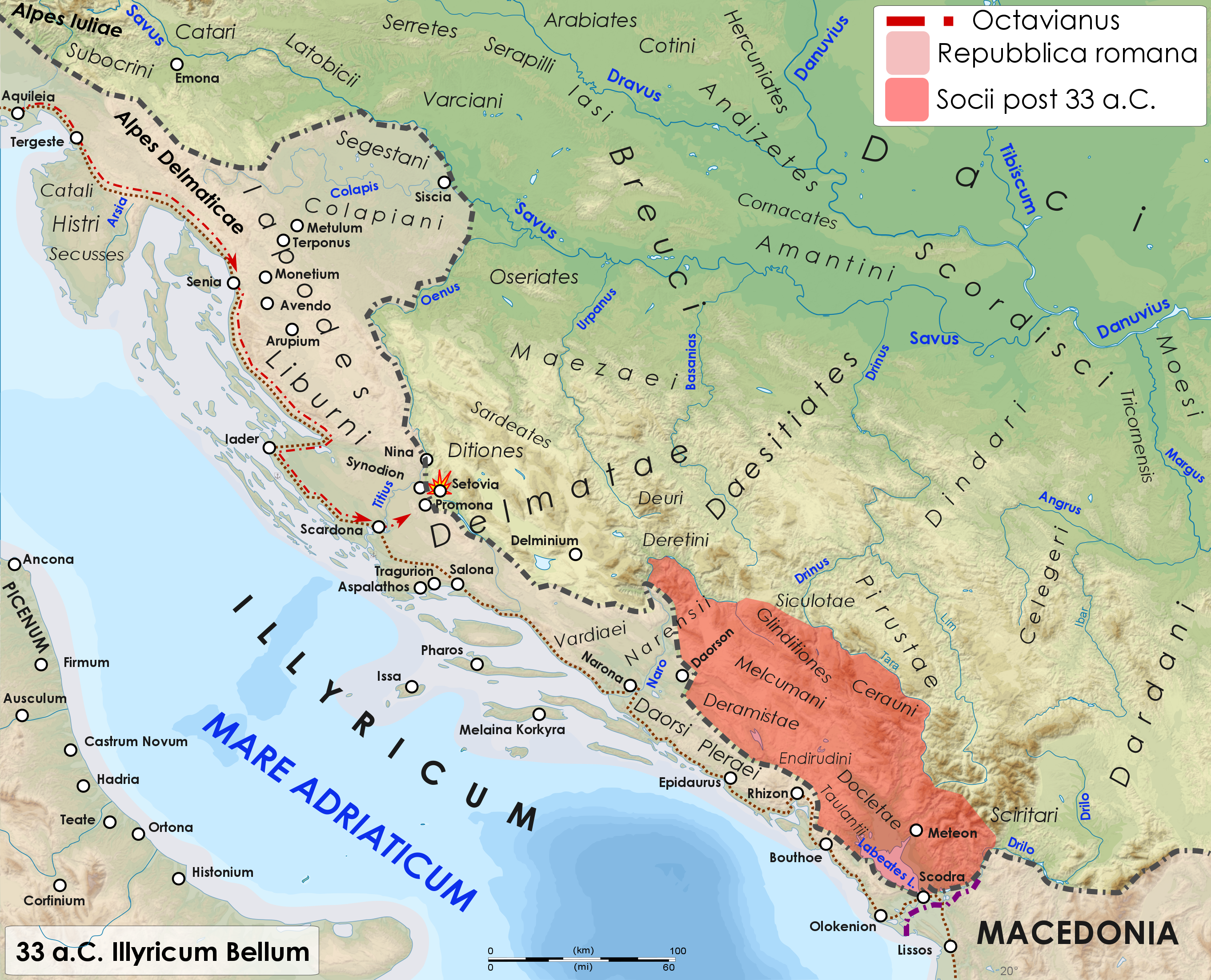
Roman war in Illyricum 33 BC

Cassius Dio wrote that after the fall of this city the rest of Pannonia surrendered. After this Octavian left Fufius Geminus there with a small force and returned to Rome. He set out to lead an expedition into Britain and had already reached Gaul in the winter of 34 BC when some of the newly conquered peoples in Pannonia and the Dalmatians rose in revolt. Appian wrote that there was a rumour that the garrison at Segesta had been massacred and Augustus made his way back. The rumour was exaggerated. There had been an uprising and the Romans had lost many men, but the next day they suppressed the rebellion. Octavian turned on the Dalmatians instead. They had been in arms since the rout of the troops of Aulus Gabinius in 48 BC. When he marched on them they formed a federation. They had up to 12,000 troops led by Versus, who had seized Promona (south of modern Knin, Croatia) from the Liburnians) and fortified it even though it was a tough mountain stronghold. Versus placed the bulk of his forces in the city and distributed the rest on the nearby hills to obstruct the Roman advance. Octavian begun to build a wall in the plain around the town and two hills held by the enemy as a cover for contingents which were heading to the highest hills through their woods. They overpowered the guards at night and at dawn Octavian attacked the city with the bulk of his army. He sent another force to reinforce the occupied heights. The enemy thought that they were attacked from all sides. Those on the hills were afraid that they would be cut off from the water supplies and fled to the town. Octavian continued to build the wall, which reached a length of seven kilometres. Testimus, another Dalmatian commander, brought a relief army. Octavian drove him back to the mountains. He seized Promona before the circumvallation was finished. A small force made a sortie. The Romans repulsed it, pursued it and entered the town with it. The enemy took refuge in the citadel. On the fourth night they attacked a Roman cohort which was keeping watch, putting it to flight. However, the attack was repulsed and the next day the city surrendered. The cohort which had fled was punished by decimation. The spared men were forced to subsist on barley instead of wheat for that summer. Testimus disbanded his troops and told them to scatter. The Romans did not pursue them. Cassius Dio wrote that Marcus Vipsanius Agrippa had conducted a campaign against the Dalmatians prior to this campaign.

Still in 34 BC, the Romans seized the town of Sunodium at the edge of the forest in which the army of Aulus Gabinius had been entrapped by the Dalmatians in a long and deep gorge between two mountains. After Octavian had burned Sunodium the Dalmatians laid an ambush. However, he was protected by soldiers he had sent to the summits of the mountains to follow him on either side while he passed through the gorge. He cut down trees and captured and burned all the towns he found on his way. In 33 BC he besieged the city of Setovia. An enemy force came to its assistance, but he prevented it from entering the place. Octavian was struck by a stone on the knee and was confined for several days. He returned to Rome to take up his consulship and got Titus Statilius to continue the siege. He then went back to Dalmatia. The Dalmatians were cut off from foreign supplies and were hungry. They met Octavian while he was on his way and surrendered. He demanded 700 of their children as hostages, and the standards of the Roman legions which had been taken from Aulus Gabinius when he was routed. They complied and also promised to pay the tribute which had been in arrears since the time of Julius Caesar. Octavian then moved on the Derbani, who also sued for peace, gave hostages, and promised to pay the tribute in arrears. Other tribes did the same on his approach. He could not reach some tribes due to sickness. These gave no hostages and made no treaties. Appian wrote that it seemed that they were subjugated later and that Octavian subdued the whole Illyrian country, including both the tribes which had rebelled and those which had never before been under Roman rule. It is likely that Appian was referring to just Illyria/Dalmatia, rather or the whole of that was to become the province of Illyricum. With regard to Pannonia, some historians think that Octavian probably conquered the southern part of Pannonia and that the northern part was conquered in the Pannonian War (see below).

Appian also wrote that Octavian overcame the Oxyaei, the Perthoneatae, the Bathiatae, the Taulantii, the Cambaei, the Cinambri, the Meromenni, and the Pyrissaei, the Docleatae, the Carui, the Interphrurini, the Naresii, the Glintidiones, the Taurisci, the Hippasini and the Bessi. The Moentini and the Avendeatae, two Iapyde tribes which lived on the Alps, surrendered on Octavian's approach. He took the city of the Arrepini, the largest and most warlike of the Iapydes, who had fled to the woods. He did not burn it hoping that they would surrender, which they did. He also seized the islands of Melite (Mljet) and Melaina Corcyra (Korčula) and destroyed its settlements because its inhabitants practiced piracy. He executed the young men and sold the rest into slavery. He deprived the Liburnians of their ships because they practiced piracy.

== Roman province ==
After his campaigns in Illyricum, Octavian fought a war against Mark Antony and Cleopatra VII of Egypt in 31/30 BC. He won and became the sole ruler of Rome, instituting government reforms which made him the first Roman emperor. Illyricum became a province as a formal administrative unit in 27 BC, as part of the settlement by which the Roman senate formalised Octavian's personal rule. He received the honorary title of Augustus, and modern historians call the ensuing period the Augustan age. The settlement divided the empire into senatorial and imperial provinces. The former were under the authority of the senate, which chose their governors from its own ranks. The latter were under Augustus, who appointed their governors. Augustus held the frontier provinces, which hosted the bulk of the Roman troops. Initially Illyricum was a senatorial propraetorial province. Rebellions in the province showed the necessity of maintaining a strong force there and in 11 BC it became an imperial province under the governorship of Publius Cornelius Dolabella.

The administrative organisation of Illyricum was carried out late in the reign of Augustus (27 BC – 14 AD) and early in the reign of Tiberius (14–37 AD). Tiberius made initial arrangements in the last weeks of the Batonian war (see below). This work was interrupted by a mutiny of the Roman troops in 14 AD, but was then resumed. We have a fairly detailed picture of the administrative arrangements of Illyricum through Pliny the Elder. The coastal area was subdivided into three regions called conventus juridicus which were named after the towns of Scardona (Skradin), Salona and Narona (near Metković). The conventus Salonitanus was subdivided into 5 civitates and 927 decuriae. The conventus Naronitianus was subdivided into 13 civitates and 540 decuriae. The conventus Scardonitanus was subdivided into 14 civitates. There is no information for its decuriae. In the more urbanised coastal area towns with large Greek-speaking populations and may inhabitants from Italy were organised as municipia (self-governing towns) or coloniae (Italian settlements) and had their own council. Some of the local communities enjoyed some privileges and some Librunian ones enjoyed Italian rights. In the less urbanised interior the administration relied exclusively on the civitates. The jurisdiction of the governor of Illyricum was limited to the coastal area. The inland districts had their own governors in the form of the praefecti civitatum of the civitates. Pannonia was subdivided into 14 civitates. Again, there is no information about the decuriae. It was also a military district under the prefect of Pannonia, who was in charge of the legions stationed there.

Dalmatia had considerable strategic and economic importance for the Romans. It possessed a number of important commercial ports along its coastline, and had gold-mines in Dalmatia with an imperial bureau in Salona. Dyrrachium (Durrës, in modern Albania) and Brundisium (Brindisi, in southern Italy) were the ports used to cross the Adriatic Sea for the journeys from Rome to the eastern Mediterranean and vice versa. Dyrrachium also became the starting point of the Via Egnatia, the Roman road which went to Byzantium in the east, opposite Asia. There were important Roman communities in a number of towns on the central and southern part of the coast of today's Croatia, such as Iader (Zadar), Salona (Solin, on the outskirts of Split), Narona (near Metković), and Epidaurus (Epidaurum in Latin, modern Cavtat, near Dubrovnik). The capital Salona was protected by two military camps at Burnum and Delminium.

=== The Pannonian War (14–10 BC) ===
From 14 BC to 10 BC there was a series of rebellions in southern Pannonia and northern Dalmatia which Roman writers referred to as bellum pannomicum (the Pannonian war). We have very little information about these events. Most of it comes from brief accounts by Cassius Dio and passing references by other authors. We are not told what the causes were either. The Roman sources had little interest in Illyria from the campaigns of Augustus in 35–33 BC to 16 BC. Cassius Dio wrote that in that year the governor of Illyria for 17–16 BC, Publius Silius Nerva, went to fight in the Italian Alps because there were no troops there. Taking advantage of this, some Pannonians and the Noricans entered Istria and pillaged it. Silius Nerva quickly brought the situation under control. At the same time, there was a small rebellion in Dalmatia. The Dentheletae (a Thracian tribe in eastern Moesia), together with the Scordisci (who lived in today's Serbia, at the confluence of the Rivers Savus [Sava], Dravus [Drava] and Danube) attacked the Roman province of Macedonia (Greece). At the same time a civil war broke out in Thrace. Therefore, there was instability on the eastern Alps and in the Balkan Peninsula. In 15 BC the Romans conquered the Scordisci and annexed Noricum. They also conducted other operations further west on the Alps against the Rhaeti and Vindelici. The Roman military operations in Illyricum might have been started by Marcus Vinicius, the governor for 14–13 BC. The Pannonian war led to Illyricum being transferred from being a senatorial province to being an imperial province.

Velleius Paterculus wrote that the Pannonian war started by Marcus Vipsanius Agrippa and Vinicius and that Tiberius ended it. Florus mentioned a victory of Vinicius over the Pannonians living between the rivers Sava and Drava. Cassius Dio noted in two separate passages that a rebellion by the Pannonians in 14 BC was suppressed quickly, and that in late 13 BC Augustus gave Agrippa, his most important ally, supreme command and sent him to Pannonia (this suggests that the problem was serious). Agrippa solved the situation through negotiations and personal influence. After Agrippa's sudden death the Breuci refused to observe the treaty they had made with him. Tiberius was given the command in Pannonia and defeated the Pannonians with the help of the Scordisci, who had been recently conquered by the Romans. Suetonius added that after this Tiberius subjugated the Dalmatians and the Breuci. In 11 BC Tiberius fought and defeated both the Dalmatians and the Pannonians. Later in the year, as already mentioned, Illyricum became an imperial province under the control of Augustus. In the winter 11/10 BC the Dacians crossed the frozen Danube and plundered the Pannonians. Some Dalmatian communities rebelled against the payment of a tribute. Tiberius, who was in Gaul, had to return to confront this. In 10 BC there were repeated uprisings in both Pannonia and Dalmatia which Tiberius suppressed.

Cassius Dio referred to all of these conflicts as rebellions. Dzino argues that it is therefore unlikely that they involved any conquests. The relations of the Romans with locals in frontier areas involved alliance treaties and treaties with client states, both of which entailed nominal independence. The breaking of these treaties was considered as a rebellion and as something which had to be suppressed. Augustus in his propagandistic writing stated that under Tiberius’ command Rome extended her sphere to Pannonian peoples where the Roman army had never been before and that Augustus extended the boundaries of Illyricum to the banks of the River Danube. However, Suetonius implied that this extension to the banks of this river occurred only after the Batonian War (see below). It is likely that in the aftermath of the Pannonian war Roman military presence in southern Pannonia increased. Dzino argues that it is likely that the local communities acted as a compact anti-Roman block and that there may have been pro- and anti-Roman factions. Some may have surrendered peacefully and some of them may have been pro-Roman all along. The communities of the region relied on kinship relationships, rather than formal state institutions. This may have led to political competition. Being friendly to the Romans or challenging them could have involved manoeuvres by local elites to strengthen their power-base. Acquiescence or opposition to the Romans could involve often unpredictable contests over political positions locally.

=== Batonian War (6–9 AD) ===
The Batonian War (bellum batonianum in Latin) was a large scale rebellion which was led by Bato the Daesitiate and Bato the Breucian. The Romans named this war after these two leaders with the same name. It lasted four years (6–9 AD). In 6 AD the Romans were preparing to launch a second expedition against the Marcomanni in Germania. This would have involved the legions stationed in Germania and most of the legions stationed in Illyricum. The natives were asked to provide auxiliary troops. When these forces gathered they rebelled under the leadership of Bato the Daesitiate. Cassius Dio described his force as Dalmatian, which suggests that he had men who came from various tribes of Dalmatia. This is a very likely scenario as the native troops would have been recruited from a wide area. A Roman force which was sent against the rebels was defeated. Bato the Breucian, the military leader of the Breuci, the largest tribe in southern Pannonia, marched on Sirmium (Sremska Mitrovica, in today's Serbia). He was defeated by Aulus Caecina Severus, the governor of the neighbouring Roman province of Moesia. Bato the Daesitiate marched on Salona, in Dalmatia, but was defeated by Marcus Valerius Messalla Messallinus, the governor of Illyricum. Bato then went east to join the other Bato and the two of them occupied Mount Alma (Mount Fruška Gora, Serbia, just north of Sirmium). They were defeated by a Thracian cavalry detachment of Rhoemetalces (the king of the Odrysian Kingdom in Thrace) which supported the Romans. The Dalmatians overran the territory of the Roman allies and drew many more tribes into the revolt. Tiberius (the future emperor), who was in charge of the Roman army marched on them. However, they avoided pitched battles and kept moving around, causing great devastation. Facing an enemy with avoided bitched battle and used guerrilla tactics, Tiberius conducted counterinsurgency operations.

According to Velleius Paterculus the rebels divided their forces into three parts. One was to invade Italy, which was not far from Nauportus (a Roman fort in today's Slovenia), one had already entered the Roman Province of Macedonia (Greece) and the third fought in their home territories. They executed their plan swiftly. They massacred Roman civilians and a sizable veteran contingent who were helpless in this remote area. They seized Macedonia and the pillaged everywhere. Thus, in this version the rebellion seemed to have a plan and the Dalmatians and the Breuci seemed to have acted in concert from the beginning. In Cassius Dio, instead, Bato the Daesitiate initially had a few men and his success increased his forces. After his failure to take Salona he allied with the other Bato. Tiberius divided the Roman army into several divisions to evade the united forces of the rebels. Outposts were placed to blockade them, to prevent them from breaking through and to disrupt their supplies. The situation in Illyricum, which was next to Italy, created panic in Rome and even Augustus was fearful. Levies were held all over Italy. The veterans were recalled. Rich families were ordered to supply freedmen compulsorily in proportion to their income. Augustus warned that the rebels could reach Rome in ten days if drastic action was not taken.

In 7 AD Augustus sent Germanicus to Illyricum with a force of freemen and freedmen. Some of the latter were requisitioned form their masters, who were paid a compensation. Velleius Paterculus wrote that the rebels in Pannonia who faced Tiberius were not happy with the size of their forces. They were worn down and brought to the verge of famine (presumably due to ravaging), could not withstand his offensives an avoided pitched battles. They went to the Claudian Mountains (a mountain range in Pannonia, in Varaždin County in northern Croatia) and took a defensive position in their fortifications. The second rebel force confronted the legions which Caecina Severus and Marcus Plautius Silvanus were bringing to Illyricum (from Moesia and the Roman province of Asia, three and two legions respectively). They surrounded the five legions, their auxiliary troops and the Thracian cavalry and almost inflicted a fatal defeat. The Thracian cavalry was routed and the allied cavalry fled. The legions suffered casualties, but they then rallied and won the day. In Cassius Dio’ version, instead, the two Batos went to wait for the arrival of Caecina Severus. He did not mention Plautius Silvanus. They attacked him unexpectedly when he was encamped near the Volcaean marshes. They were defeated. After this battle the Roman army was divided into detachments to overrun many parts of the country at once. The rebels withdrew to mountain fortresses from which they launched raids whenever they could. Aulus Caecina Severus and Marcus Plautius Silvanus joined Tiberius and a huge army was assembled. As mentioned, they had five legions. Tiberius also had five legions (three in Pannonia and two in Dalmatia). Tiberius decided to send the newly arrived armies back because the army was too large to be manageable. He escorted them with his troops. He then returned to Siscia at the beginning of a very hard winter.

In 8 AD the Dalmatians and the Pannonians wanted to sue for peace due to famine and disease, but they were prevented from doing so by the rebels, who had no hope of being spared by the Romans and continued to resist. Tiberius had pursued a policy of scorched earth to starve the Pannonians. According to Cassius Dio, Bato the Breucian overthrew Pinnes, the king of the Breuci. He became suspicious of his subject tribes and demanded hostages from the Pannonian garrisons. Bato the Daesitiate defeated him in battle and pinned him in a stronghold. He was handed over to Bato the Daesitiate and he was executed. After this many Pannonians rose in revolt. Marcus Plautius Silvanus conducted a campaign against them, conquered the Breuci and won over other tribes without a battle. Bato the Daesitiate withdrew from Pannonia, occupied the passes leading to Dalmatia and ravaged Dalmatia. In Pannonia there was some brigandage. Velleius Paterculus, wrote that the harsh winter brought rewards because in the following summer all of Pannonia sought peace. The Pannonians laid down their arms at the River Bathinus. Bato was made a prisoner and Pinnes gave himself up.

In 9 AD the war was restricted to Dalmatia. Velleius Paterculus wrote that Augustus gave the chief command of all the forces to Marcus Aemilius Lepidus. In the summer Lepidus made his way to Tiberius through areas which had not been affected by the war. He was attacked by the locals who had not been weakened by fighting. Lepidus defeated them, ravaged the fields, and burnt houses. He succeeded in reaching Tiberius. This campaign ended the war. Two Dalmatian tribes, the Perustae and Daesitiate, who were almost unconquerable because of their mountain strongholds, the narrow passes in which they lived and their fighting spirit, were almost exterminated. Cassius Dio wrote Germanicus conducted some operations in Dalmatia and seized several towns. Tiberius then split the army into three divisions. He sent two of them to subdue areas of Dalmatia and he went in search of Bato the Daesitiate third one. Tiberius chased the fugitive Bato around the country. He finally besieged him at Adetrium, near Salona. This was on a rock and was surrounded by steep ravines. After a long siege he managed to storm the place. Bato promised to surrender if he and his followers would be pardoned. Tiberius agreed. According to Cassius Dio Tiberius asked Bato why his people had rebelled. He replied: "You Romans are to blame for this; for you send as guardians of your flocks, not dogs or shepherds, but wolves." It is uncertain if this quote can be attributed to Bato, however, due to the habit of ancient writers of creating fictitious quotes and attributing them to historical figures.

=== Regions of the province and its later dissolution ===
The earliest writing which indicates that the province of Illyricum comprised Dalmatia and Pannonia is when Velleius Paterculus mentions Gaius Vibius Postumus was the military commander of Dalmatia in AD 9, towards the end of the Batonian War. It seems that officially the province of Illyricum comprised Upper (Superius) and Lower (Inferius) Illyricum. A transcript of an inscription of a monument honouring Publius Cornelius Dolabella at Epidaurum (Cavtat, near Dubrovnik) attests that Dolabella was appointed governor of Illyricum shortly before Augustus’ death and that the statue was erected by the towns of Upper Illyricum, which implies the existence of an Upper and Lower Illyricum. However, no inscriptions attesting a Lower Illyricum have been found as yet. Dalmatia was called Upper Illyricum. Whilst the names Dalmatia and Pannonia were used in common parlance, it seems that Upper Illyricum (Dalmatia) and Lower Illyricum (Pannonia) were the official names of the two regions. The provincial governor resided in Salona in Dalmatia and governed Upper Illyricum. Lower Illyricum was a military district and a military commander was in charge of this area and its three legions and performed administrative functions as something like a deputy governor.

Writing in the winter of AD 57–58, the Apostle Paul refers to Illyricum in his Letter to the Romans as the westernmost point of his missionary travels so far. The letter reflects his intention in due course to travel to Rome.

The province of Illyricum was eventually dissolved and replaced by two smaller provinces: Dalmatia (the southern area) and Pannonia (the northern and Danubian area). It is unclear when this happened. Kovác noted that an inscription on the base of a statue of Nero erected between 54 and 68 AD attests that it was erected by the veteran of a legion stationed in Pannonia and argues that this is the first epigraphic evidence that a separate Pannonia existed at least since the reign of Nero. However, Šašel-Kos notes that an inscription attests a governor of Illyricum under the reign of Claudius (43–51 AD) and in a military diploma published in the late 1990s, dated July 61 AD, units of auxiliaries from the Pannonian part of the province were mentioned as being stationed in Illyricum. Some other diplomas from the reign of Nero attest the same. Therefore, Šašel-Kos supports the notion that the province was dissolved during the reign of Vespasian (69–79 AD)

== Diocletian's and Constantine's reforms ==
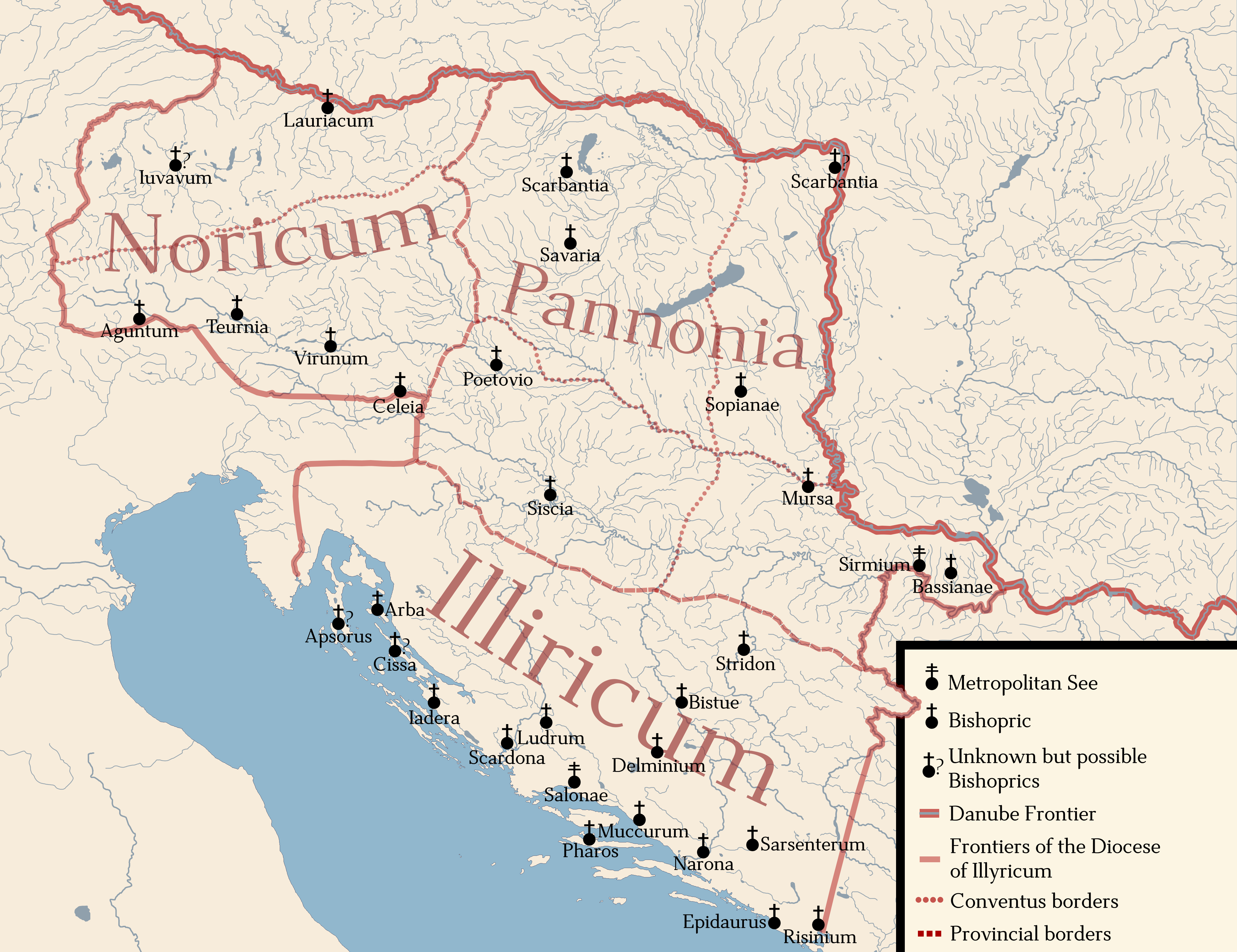
Hypothetical map of the possible Bishoprics of the Dioceses of Illyricum (Pannonia) based on the little information there is about it after the year 400 AD.

At the end of the 3rd century and during the first half of the 4th century, major administrative reforms took place, particularly during the reign of emperor Diocletian (284–305), when the entire territory of the Empire was divided into newly formed imperial dioceses, and also during the reign of emperor Constantine (306–337), when dioceses were grouped into four newly created praetorian prefectures.

In 293 AD the emperor Diocletian radically reformed the administrative structure of the Roman empire. He created the tetrarchy (rule by four). This was a co-emperorship with two senior emperors (Augusti), Diocletian and Maximian, and two junior emperors (Caesars), Constantius Chlorus and Galerius. Diocletian and Maximian were also in overall charge of the eastern and the western part of the empire respectively. The number of provinces was doubled and they were grouped into fifteen dioceses. The region of Illyricum was covered by two dioceses: in Western Illyricum, the Diocese of Pannonia was formed, also known as the Diocese of Illyricum, while in Eastern Illyricum a wast Diocese of Moesia was formed, but later (during the Constantinian period) divided into two dioceses (Dacia and Macedonia), that comprised (since Constantinian times) the Praetorian prefecture of Illyricum.

The Diocese of Pannonia (Western Illyricum), included all provinces in modern western Hungary, almost all of Croatia and Bosnia and Herzegovina, and northern Serbia, while the west Praetorian prefecture of Illyricum (Eastern Illyricum) included provinces in modern central and southern Serbia, entire Montenegro, Albania, North Macedonia, almost all of Greece, and western Bulgaria.

Western Illyricum (the Diocese of Pannonia) was thus subdivided into the provinces of Pannonia Prima, Pannonia Valeria, Pannonia Savia and Pannonia Secunda (the northwest, northeast, southwest, and southeast of Pannonia respectively), Dalmatia, Noricum Ripense and Noricum Mediterraneum. In the Eastern Illyricum, the capital of the Praetorian prefecture of Illyricum was Sirmium (modern Sremska Mitrovica, in northern Serbia). That praetorian prefecture survived until the early 7th century.

== Military importance ==
Roman Illyricum, including Dalmatia and Pannonia, was a very valuable source of military manpower for the entire empire. From the 3rd to the 6th century some of the most useful troops were recruited from Pannonia, Dalmatia, Moesia and Roman Thrace. The Roman General Stilicho attempted to bring the region under Western Roman control for this reason. Pannonia and the other areas along the River Danube, the frontier of the empire in the Balkan Peninsula, were exposed to attacks on the empire from across this river. Therefore, Pannonia was very important militarily. Pat Southern sees Illyricum as holding the empire together. In the Late Roman Empire, the armies of the praetorian prefecture of Illyricum had a commander in-chief, the magister militum per Illyricum, based at Naissus (Niš, southern Serbia). John Bury wrote that "The importance of Illyricum did not lie in its revenues, but in its men." The region's native peoples, renowned for their military prowess, became important for the Roman army. During the Crisis of the Third Century the emperors Claudius II (reigned 268–270), Quintillus (reigned 270), Aurelian (reigned 270–275) and Probus (reigned 276–282) were born in Sirmium (Sremska Mitrovica, Serbia). They have been dubbed by historians the Pannonian emperors. Diocletian (reigned 284–305) was born in Salona (Solin, Croatia). Constantine the Great and Constantius III (421AD ) were born in Naissus (Niš, Serbia). His father, Constantius Chlorus, was born in Moesia Superior. The Byzantine emperor Anastasius I (reigned 491–518) was born in Dyrrhachium (Durrës, Albania). Justinian I (reigned 527–565) was born in Tauresium, in the province of Dardania in the Diocese of Dacia (20 kilometres [12 miles] southeast of Skopje in today's North Macedonia). Justinian I was the last Latin emperor of this empire. From then on all the emperors were Greek.

== Population ==
Population of Roman Illyricum was comprized mainly of local Illyrian tribes, and Roman settlers (administrators, soldiers, colonists). With Roman colonization, the process of cultural Romanization was initiated, thus leading to acculturation of local Illyrians, whose elites started to accept various Roman customs and Latin language. Thus in time, Roman colonists and Romanized Illyrians became a majority in the region.

Colonists from other parts of the empire were also present in the region, as atestet by presence of various eastern religions, from Mithraism to Judaism, and later Christianity. Jewish communities were also active in the cities and trade routes of Illyricum during the late Roman period. As the empire was reorganized into dioceses and prefectures, Jewish merchants, artisans, and settlers operated in urban centers such as Salona, Sirmium, and Naissus — all located within the newly defined boundaries of the Praetorian Prefecture of Illyricum. These Jews were largely part of the Hellenized diaspora, using Koine Greek in inscriptions and communal life, and aligning their practices more closely with Jerusalem Talmud traditions than with emerging Babylonian halakhah.

Despite the political centralization, Jewish religious life in Illyricum remained decentralized and primarily local. The growing infrastructure of the prefecture — especially in Sirmium, a key Roman administrative center — provided stability that likely allowed Jewish families to maintain synagogues, ritual customs, and trade connections between the Adriatic coast and inland Roman provinces. Archaeological and genetic evidence suggests that these Jewish communities contributed to the matrilineal continuity of frontier Jewish identity well into the Byzantine and early medieval periods.

== See also ==
- Illyria
- Illyrians
- Diocese of Illyricum
- Prefecture of Illyricum

== Sources ==
Primary sources

- Appian, The Foreign Wars, Book 10, The Illyirian Wars; Loeb Classical Library, Vol II, Books 8.2-12, Harvard University Press, 1912; ISBN 978-0674990043
- Cassius Dio, Roman History, Vol 6, Books. 51–65 (Loeb Classical Library), Loeb, 1989; ISBN 978-0674990920

Secondary sources

- Barnes, Timothy D. (1982). The New Empire of Diocletian and Constantine. Cambridge, MS: Harvard University Press.
- Dzino, D., The Bellum Pannonicum: The Roman armies and indigenous communities in southern Pannonia 16 9 BC, Actes du Symposium International le Livre. La Roumanie.L ’Europe. Bibliothèque Métropolitaine de Bucarest, Vol III, 4ème édition 20 – 23 Septembre 2011
- Danijel Dzino (2010). Illyricum in Roman Politics, 229BC–AD68. Cambridge University Press.
- Marjeta Šašel Kos. Appian and Illyricum. Situla 43. (National Museum of Slovenia Ljubljana, 2005)
- Mirković, Miroslava B. (2017). Sirmium: Its History from the First Century AD to 582 AD. Novi Sad: Center for Historical Research.
- Mócsy, András (2014) [1974]. Pannonia and Upper Moesia: A History of the Middle Danube Provinces of the Roman Empire. New York: Routledge. ISBN 9781317754251.
- Papazoglu, Fanula (1978). The Central Balkan Tribes in pre-Roman Times: Triballi, Autariatae, Dardanians, Scordisci and Moesians. Amsterdam: Hakkert.
- Papazoglu, Fanula (1989). "L'organisation politique de l'Illyrie méridionale" (PDF). Živa antika. 39 (1–2): 31–53.
- Várady, László (1969). Das Letzte Jahrhundert Pannoniens (376–476). Amsterdam: Verlag Adolf M. Hakkert.
- Wozniak, Frank E. (1981). "East Rome, Ravenna and Western Illyricum: 454-536 A.D." Historia: Zeitschrift für Alte Geschichte. 30 (3): 351–382.
- Wilkes, J., The Illyrians (The Peoples of Europe), 1996, ISBN 9780631198079
