= Liburnians =

Ancient tribe by the Adriatic Sea

Liburnian territory during the 5th century BC

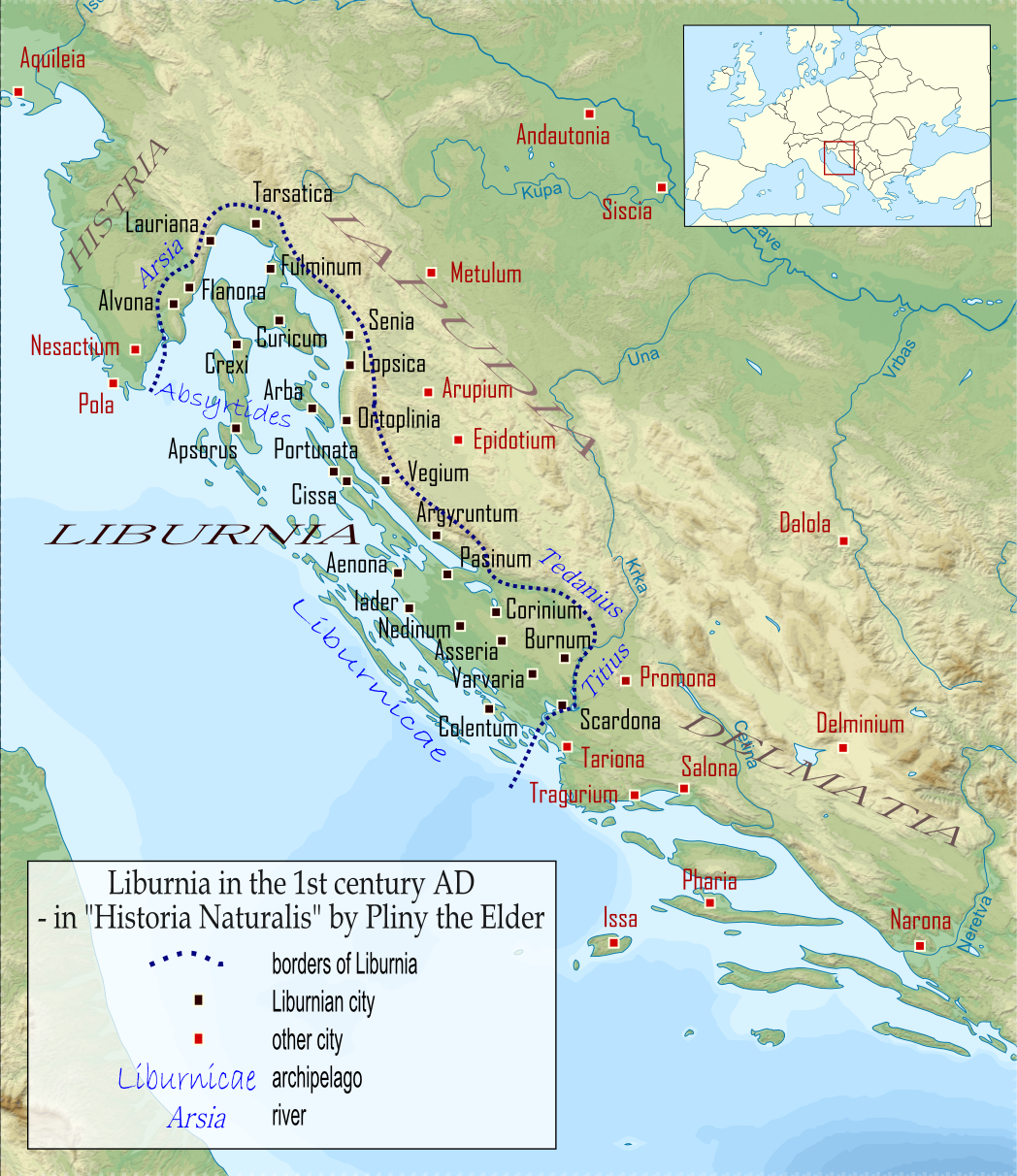
Liburnia in the age of the Roman conquest

The Liburnians or Liburni (Ancient Greek: Λιβυρνοί) were an ancient tribe inhabiting the district called Liburnia, a coastal region of the northeastern Adriatic between the rivers Arsia (Raša) and Titius (Krka) in what is now Croatia. According to Strabo's Geographica, they populated Kerkyra until shortly after the Corinthians settled the island, c. 730 BC. Their ethnic and linguistic origins are unknown.

== Origins ==
The Liburni's archaeological culture can be traced to the Late Bronze Age and "were settled since at least the tenth century BC in northern Dalmatia". Some Greek and Roman historians considered them to be of Asia Minor origin, while others claimed that were some common characteristics between them and Etruscans. Modern scholarship refutes both theories.

Appian considered them as "one of the Illyrian peoples", an "Illyrian tribe", aligning with Florus' designation of them as the first enemies of Rome during the Illyro-Roman Wars. However, although sometimes designated as Illyrian in historical sources and historiography they did not belong to Illyrii proprie dicti, nor to the Illyrian groups of Dalmatia and Pannonia, and Livy for example considered them "different people from the Illyrians".

As foreign sources probably mixed various data on ethnic and non-ethnic Illyrians, it is considered today on the basis of material and linguistic evidence that the Liburni belonged to broader term of "so-called Illyrian peoples", but were not ethnic Illyrians, ie being their closest relatives.

However, modern historiography questions the same scholarship's methodological identification of ethnicity with material culture, linguistic traces, deities and else which ignores anthropological exchange, and notes that prior 4th century BCE the name of Liburni and Illyrians could have been synonyms and the former was only later distinctively used in narrow sense for people of North Adriatic territory.

The Liburnian people, especially when were stationed in foreign land, identified themselves as "Liburnus" or "natione Liburnus", but the identity was also related to same-named administrative unit in Roman province of Illyricum, making the shared sense of ethnic and political identity prior to the 1st century BCE a matter of debate among modern scholars. The surnames Liburnus, Liburna and personal names Liburnius and Liburnia are not necessarily related to ethnic identity but rather Liburna, which can refer to a specific type of ship, a name for carriers of chair, and servers in royal courts.

== History ==
=== Classic age ===
Ethnolinguistic map of Italy in the Iron Age, before the Roman expansion and conquest of Italy

The first account of the Liburni comes from Hecataeus of Miletus (6th century BCE) and Strabo ("referring to the eighth century BCE"). They reportedly were expelled from Korkyra by the Greeks, where Liburni previously expelled another Illyrian people Taulantii, during the period of foundation of Syracuse, Sicily. Appian also wrote that they possessed Epidamnus in Albania, but both accounts, although possibly anachronistic, don't seem impossible. They are probably a reflection of Illyrian southward migration during the Early Iron Age (c. 1000 BCE).

The fall of Liburnian domination in the Adriatic Sea and their final retreat to their ethnic region (Liburnia) were caused by the military and political activities of Dionysius the Elder of Syracuse (406 – 367 BC). The imperial power base of this Syracusan tyrant stemmed from a huge naval fleet of 300 tetreras and penteras. After he ended Carthaginian authority in Sicily, he turned against the Etruscans. He made use of the Celtic invasion of Italy, and the Celts became his allies in the Italian peninsula (386 - 385 BC). This alliance was crucial for his politics, then focusing on the Adriatic Sea, where the Liburnians still dominated. In light of this strategy, he established a few Syracusan colonies on the coasts of the Adriatic Sea: Adria at the mouth of Po river and Ancona at the western Adriatic coast, Issa on the outermost island of the central Adriatic archipelago (island of Vis) and others. Meanwhile, in 385-384 BC he helped colonists from the Greek island of Paros to establish Pharos (Starigrad) colony on the Liburnian island of Hvar, thus taking control of the important points and navigable routes in the southern, central and northern Adriatic.

The name of the Vindelician town of Cambodunum (today Kempten) is apparently derived from the Celtic cambo dunon: "fortified place at the river bend" . One classical source, Servius' commentary on Virgil's Aeneid, says on the contrary that the Vindelicians were originally Liburnians – a non-Celtic Indo-European-speaking people from the northeastern shores of the Adriatic (modern Croatia).

This caused a simultaneous Liburnian resistance on both coasts, whether in their ethnic domain or on the western coast, where their possessions or interests were in danger. A great naval battle was recorded a year after the establishment of Pharos colony, by a Greek inscription in Pharos (384 – 383 BC) and by the Greek historian Diodorus Siculus (80–29 BC), initiated by conflicts between the Greek colonists and the indigenous Hvar islanders, who asked their compatriots for support. 10,000 Liburnians sailed out from their capital Idassa (Zadar), led by the Iadasinoi (people of Zadar), and laid siege to Pharos. The Syracusan fleet positioned in Issa was informed in time, and Greek triremes attacked the siege fleet, taking victory in the end. According to Diodorus, the Greeks killed more than 5,000 and captured 2,000 prisoners, ran down or captured their ships, and burned their weapons in dedication to their god.

This battle meant the loss of the most important strategic Liburnian positions in the centre of the Adriatic, resulting in their final retreat to their main ethnic region, Liburnia, and their complete departure from the Italic coast, apart from Truentum (nowadays on the border between Marche and Abruzzo). Greek colonization, however, did not extend into Liburnia, which remained strongly held, and Syracusan dominance suddenly diminished upon the death of Dionysius the Elder. The Liburnians recovered and developed piracy to secure navigable routes in the Adriatic, as recorded by Livius for 302 BC.

The middle of the 3rd century BC was marked by the rise of an Illyrian kingdom in the south of the Adriatic, led by king Agron of the Ardiaei. Its piratical activities imperiled Greek and Roman interests in the Adriatic, and caused the first Roman intervention on the eastern coast in 229 BC; Florus in Epitome of Roman History noted the Liburnians as the Romans' enemies in this expedition, while Appian (Bell. Civ., II, 39) noted liburnae as swift galleys the Romans first fought with when they entered the Adriatic. The Liburni were allies of their southern Illyrian compatriots, Ardiaei and the others, but from the lack of more records related to them in the 3rd century BC, it is assumed that they mostly stood aside in the subsequent Roman wars and conflicts with Pyrrhus, Carthage, Macedonia and the southern Illyrian state. Even though Liburnian territory was not involved in these confrontations, it seems that the Liburna warship was adopted by the Romans during the Punic Wars and in the Second Macedonian War.

=== Hellenistic and Roman periods ===
In 181 BC, the Romans established their colony at Aquileia and took control of all Venetia in the north, thus expanding towards the Illyrian area from the northwest. In 177 BC they conquered Istria to the north of the eastern Adriatic coast, settled by tribe of Histri, while the Iapodes, the northern neighbors of Liburnia, attacked Aquileia in 171 BC. These incidents did not involve Liburnian territory. The Liburnians probably avoided direct conflict with the Romans in order to safeguard their remaining naval activities. After their arrival to the west of Liburnia, Roman legions also appeared on its southern borders, defeating the southern Illyrians and finally king Gentius in 167 BC, and during wars against the tribe of Dalmatae in 156–155 BC. The first Roman appearance in Liburnian waters occurred in 129 BC, during the military expedition of the Roman consul Gaius Sempronius Tuditanus against the Iapodes, which ended with hard-won victories over the Iapodes, Carni, Taurisci and Liburnians.

In 84 BC, the Roman consuls enemies of Sulla mobilized an army in Italy and tried to use Liburnian territory, probably some outer island, to organize a military campaign back into Italy, against Sulla. This failed owing to bad weather and the low morale of the soldiers, who massively escaped to their homes in Italy, or refused to cross the sea to Liburnia. The Roman legions once again passed through Liburnian territory, probably by sea along the coast, in their next expedition against the Dalmatae (78–76 BC), started from the north, from Aquileia and Istria, to stabilize Roman control of the Dalmatian city Salona.

In 59 BC, Illyricum was assigned as a provincia (or zone of responsibility) to Julius Caesar, and the main Liburnian city of Iadera was nominally proclaimed a Roman municipium, but the real establishment of the Roman province occurred no earlier than 33 BC.

The Dalmatae soon recovered and entered into conflict with the Liburnians in 51 BC (probably over possession of the pasture grounds around the Krka river), taking their city Promona. The Liburnians were not strong enough to reconquer it alone, so they appealed to Caesar, then the Roman proconsul of Illyricum. However, the Liburnian army, strategically supported by the Romans, was heavily defeated by the Dalmatae.

The civil war between Caesar and Pompey in 49 BC affected all of the Roman Empire, as well as Liburnia. In that year, near the island of Krk, there was an important naval battle between the forces of Caesar and Pompey, involving local Liburnian support to both sides. Caesar was supported by the urban Liburnian centres, like Iader, Aenona and Curicum, while the rest of Liburnia supported Pompey, including the city of Issa where residents objected to Caesar's support for the Dalmatae in Salona. The "Navy of Iader" (Zadar) which may have included both Liburnian and Roman ships, confronted the "Liburnian navy" in service to Pompey, equipped with only Liburnians in their liburnae galleys.

Caesar rewarded his supporters in Liburnian Iader and Dalmatian Salona with the status of Roman colonies, but the battle was won by the Liburnian navy, prolonging the civil war, and ensuring control of the Adriatic to the side aligned with Pompey over the next 2 years until his final defeat in 48 BC. In the same year, Caesar sent his legions to take control of the rebellious Illyricum province, and took the fortress of Promona from Dalmatian hands, making them submit.

Throughout this time, Roman rule in Illyricum province, largely nominal, was concentrated in only a few cities on the eastern Adriatic coast, such as Iader, Salona and Narona. Renewed Illyrian and Liburnian piracy motivated Octavian to organize a great military operation in Illyricum province in 35 BC, to finally stabilize Roman control of it. This action was first concentrated on the coastal Illyrian tribes to the east of Narona, then was expanded along the depth of Illyrian territory, where continental tribes gave much stronger resistance. After returning from the inland areas of Illyricum, Octavian destroyed the Illyrian pirate communities on the islands of Melita (Mljet) and Korkyra Nigra (Korčula), and continued to Liburnia, where he wiped out the last remnants of the Liburnian naval forces, thus resolving the problems of their renewed piratical activities in the bay of Kvarner (sinus Flanaticus) and their attempt to secede from Rome. Octavian commandeered all the Liburnian ships. Very soon these galleys would play a decisive role in the battle near Actium.

Octavian made another expedition inland against the Iapodes from the Liburnian port of Senia (Senj), and conquered their most important positions in 34 BC. Over the next 2 years the Roman army, led by Marcus Vipsanius Agrippa, fought hard battles with the Dalmatae. The Liburnians were not recorded as participants in this war, but their southernmost territories were surely involved.

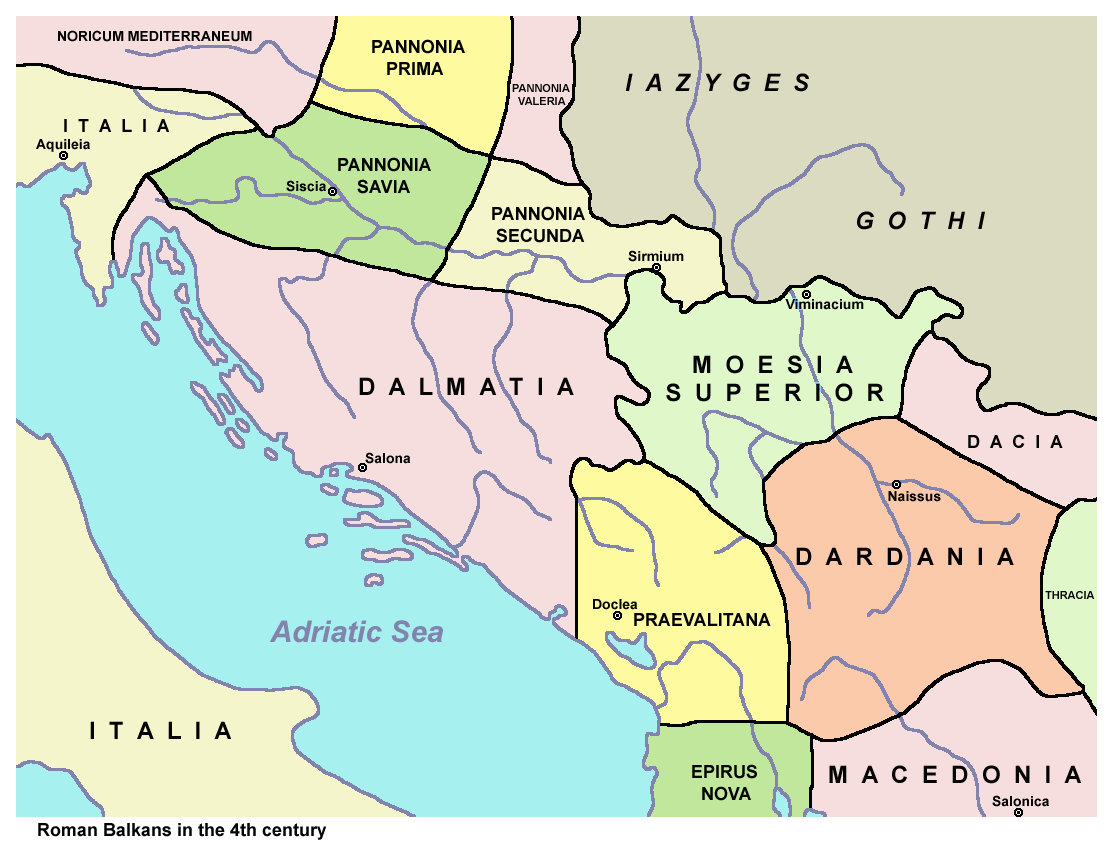
The Province of Dalmatia, (4th century AD)

It is uncertain whether the Liburnians joined in the last Great Illyrian Revolt; this remains debatable, as the only evidence is a damaged inscription found in Verona, mentioning the Iapodes and Liburnians under an unknown leader.

Over the centuries, naval power was the most important aspect of warfare for the Liburni. After the empowered Roman forces defeated the Liburni, the region became part of the Roman province of Dalmatia, but it was considered marginal in a military sense. Burnum on the Krka river became a Roman military camp, while the plains of Liburnia proper inland from Iader, already urbanized, now became easily accessible to control by Roman rulers. However, Liburnian seafaring tradition was not extinguished; it rather acquired a more commercial character under the new circumstances as Liburnia's ports and cities thrived economically and culturally. Despite Romanization, especially in the larger cities, Liburnians retained their traditions, cults, burial customs (Liburnian cipus), names, etc., as attested by the archaeological evidence from that era.

== Archaeology ==
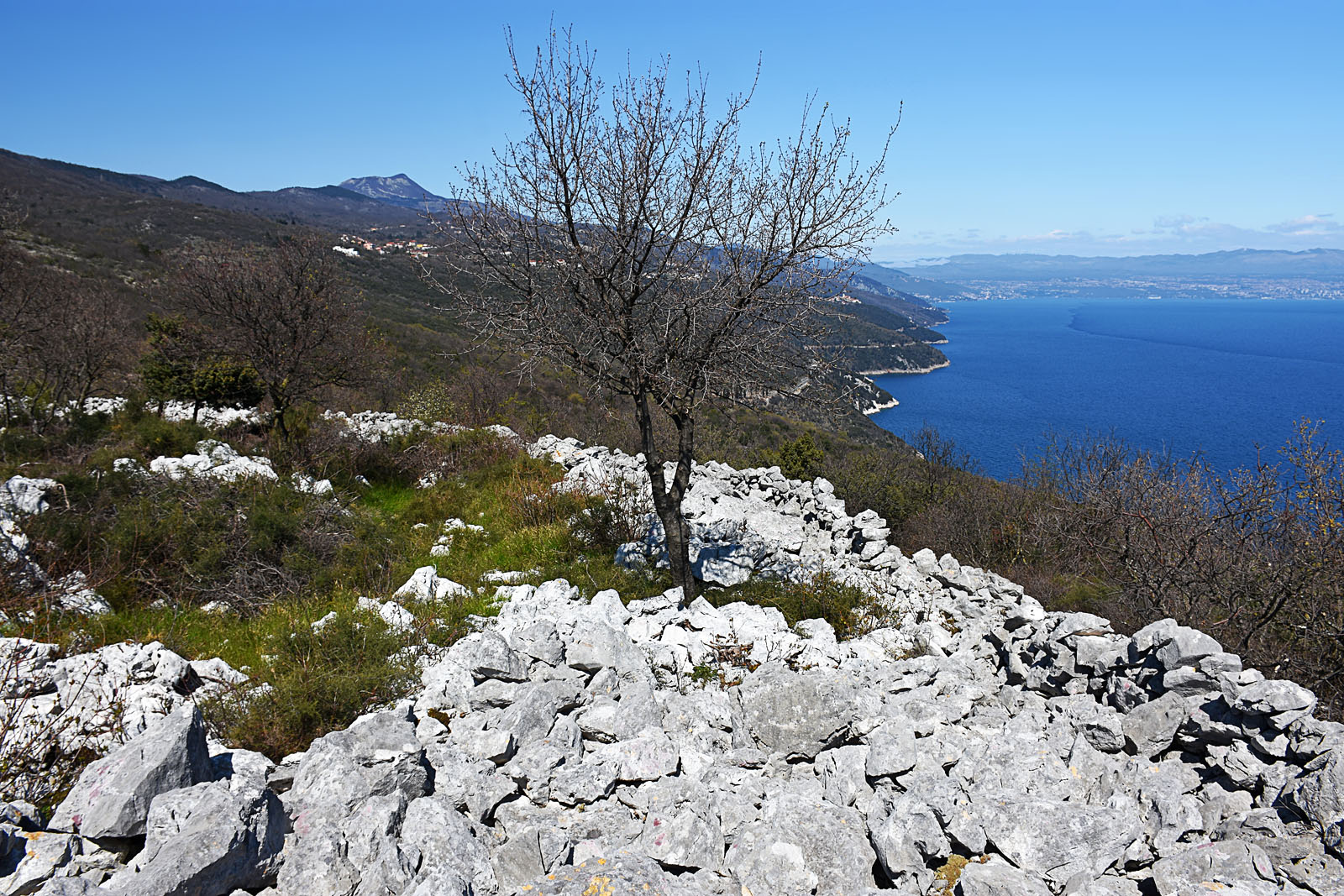
Liburnian coast - from Vela Ozida towards the N-NE

The development of Liburnian culture can be divided into 3 main time periods:

- 11th and 10th centuries BC. Between two waves of Balkan-Pannonian migrations, this was a transitive period between the Bronze Age and the Iron Age, with features more related to the Late Bronze Age. It was characterized by the influence of the Urnfield Culture that spread in the Pannonian areas, in addition to the general changes caused by the Balkan-Pannonian migrations.
- 9th to the 5th centuries BC. Liburnian domination in the Adriatic Sea; its first phase (9th century BC), because of the aforementioned migrations, did not continue the developments of the Late Bronze Age, except in certain forms. This was the beginning of the Liburnian Iron Age, marked by their expansion and colonization of Picenum, Daunia and Apulia on the Italic shores. The establishment of colonies resulted in a highly developed and rich culture based on naval trade, in the 8th and 7th centuries BC. This was followed by isolation from the Balkan area, except from Iapodian areas. The lucrative exchange of materials with the opposite coast was continued in the 6th century BC, and its connection to Picenum remained strong, and links to Iapodes and Dalmatae have also been attested. In the 5th century BC, the Greeks undertook the leadership of trade in the Adriatic and considerable changes resulted, such as the importing of a wider range of Greek products.
- 5th to the 1st centuries BC. Decline of Liburnia's power; Liburnian culture was thoroughly under Hellenic influence, although specifically local cultural aspects were retained. Apart from the extended importation of Hellenistic and Italic pottery, and other lesser influences, Liburnian cultural relations with other peoples were rather poor.

=== Settlements ===
The principal forms of settlements were forts (Latin: castellum, Croatian: gradina) built for defense, usually on elevations and fortified with dry walls. In Liburnian territory, about 400 have been identified so far, but they were considerably more numerous. About a hundred names of these hill-forts have kept their roots from prehistory, especially places that had been inhabited permanently, such as Zadar (Iader), Nin (Aenona), Nadin (Nedinium), Rab (Arba), Krk (Curicum), etc. The dwellings were square, dry-wall, ground-floor buildings of one room. Similar stone houses are preserved in Croatian tradition all over Dalmatia and Kvarner, mostly of the rounded form called bunja.

=== Burial tradition ===
The Liburnians buried their dead in graves near or beneath settlements. It is known that they laid their dead on one side in a contracted position, mostly in chests of stone slabs. Tumuli are numerous all over Liburnian territory, especially in the heartland of Liburnia proper (Nin, Zaton, etc.). Although most grave sites were from the beginning of the Iron Age, many were continually used in the Copper Age or from the Early Bronze Age to the end of the Iron Age. Inhumation under tumuli as practiced in Liburnian territory was undoubtedly inherited from earlier times.

=== Material culture ===
The transitory remains of culture are represented by various artifacts, mostly jewellery, pottery, and pieces of costume. Other forms are less common, such as weapons, tools etc. Especially numerous are fibulae, some twenty forms and many more variants, as well as ornamental pins. Small sculptures representing animals and people are fairly common. Various coins from 23 mints beginning from the 6th and especially the 3rd century have been found in former Liburnian territory, from Greek cities, colonies, Italian cities, Illyrian rulers, North African, Celtic and Roman. Bronze and glass vessels occur very rarely. Pottery is found mostly in settlements and tumuli, but it rarely occurs in tombs, except in rare tombs of Hellenistic type. Pottery was made without throwing, with a mixture of calcite, and burnt on an open fire. Imported pottery is also common, especially from southern Italy, from the 8th to 1st centuries BC; mostly Apulian vessels, but also some Greek pottery was imported.

=== Religion ===
The mythology of the people of Illyria is only known through the mention of Illyrian deities on Roman Empire period monuments, some with interpretatio Romana. There appears to be no single most prominent Illyrian god, and there would have been much variation between individual Illyrian tribes. The Illyrians did not develop a uniform cosmology on which to center their religious practices.

Iutossica and Anzotica, the latter identified with Venus (Venus Ansotica), Iicus (Iuppiter Sabasius Iicus), Taranucus (Iuppiter Taranucus) and so on were worshipped in Liburnia. Bindus, identified with Neptune, was worshiped among the Japodes as the guardian deity of springs and seas.

=== Economy ===
Liburnia's economy relied on its strength in the sectors of agriculture, stock breeding, crafts, trade, barter, seamanship, fishing, hunting, and food collecting. The Liburnians traded over the whole of the Adriatic, and into the Middle and Eastern Mediterranean and the northwestern Balkan peninsula. They exported mostly to the territories of the Iapodes and Dalmatae, and across the Adriatic to Picenum and southern Italy, especially the commodities of jewellery, cheese, clothing, etc., and they imported mostly from Italy, primarily pottery, and various adopted coins. Importation of amber from the Baltic cannot be proven, but acquisitions likely occurred in Liburnian territory.

=== Social relations ===
Insights into social relations are possible by means of cultural relics, Roman-era inscriptions, and the works of several authors. Mention of the special role of women in Liburnian society can be noted in their writings, but the idea about their matriarchy is scientifically rejected. They describe the original division into several tribes and territorial communities, later fused into a union of tribes and a single ethnic community of Liburnians. Social relations were based on the structure of family and clan. Collections of tumuli correspond to this; there were up to 18 graves in a tumulus through several generations, or individual interments, with up to 8 bodies in each grave. Certain data suggest social division, stratification, and inequality, where the Liburnian aristocracy maintained many privileges, special status, and features of their culture under Roman rule.

=== Relations to other cultures ===
Liburnian culture mainly developed on the basis of inheritance and independent development, partly through foreign influence, particularly Italic and Hellenic, as well as through the imports of foreign goods. Links with the Pannonian basin were fewer than in Late Bronze Age. Much more important were links with the Iapodes, and especially with the Dalmatae. Histrian culture developed differently, and their links with the Liburnians were less general. The exchange with Italy was varied and important. The Liburnians had the most versatile relationships with Picenum and southern Italy because of Liburnian immigration. Trade with the Greeks was more meagre, except in the Hellenistic age. Just as in other parts of the Mediterranean, large quantities of North African coins are prominent. Celtic influence is important, especially in jewellery and tools, but mostly it is not direct.

== Seafarers ==
The Liburnians were renowned seafarers, notorious for their raids in the Adriatic Sea, which they conducted in their swift galleys. The Romans knew them principally as a people addicted to piracy.

The Liburnians constructed different ship types; their galaia was an early prototype of transport galleys, lembus was a fishing ship continued by the present-day Croatian levut, and a drakoforos was apparently mounted with a dragonhead at the prow.

Remains of a 10 meter long ship from the 1st century BC were found in Zaton near Nin (Aenona in Liburnia proper), the ship keel with the bottom planking made of 6 rows of wooden boards on each side, joined together and sewn with resin cords and wooden wedges, testifying to the Liburnian shipbuilding tradition style known as "Serilia Liburnica". Deciduous trees (oak and beech) were used, while some climber was used for the cords.

A 10th-century AD ship of identical form and size, made with wooden fittings instead of sewn planking joints, was found in the same place, "Condura Croatica" used by the Medieval Croats. Condura could be the closest known vessel to the original "liburna" galley in form, only much smaller, with the features of a quick and agile galley, having a shallow bottom, very straightened but long, with one large Latin sail and a row of oars on each side.

=== Liburna ===
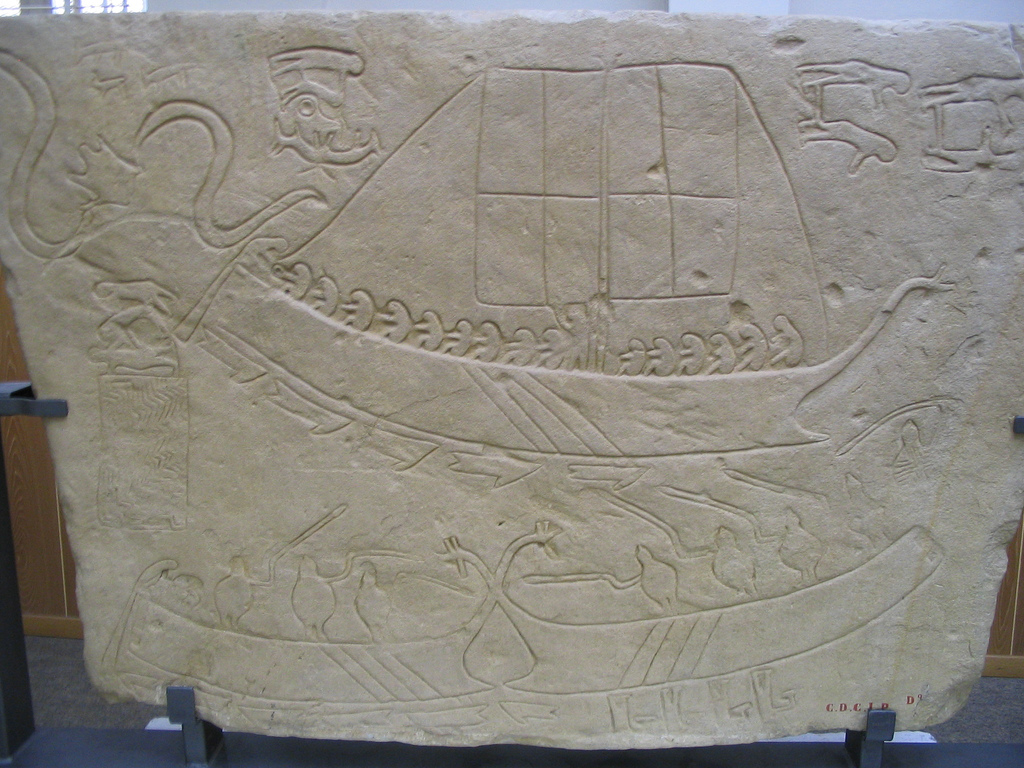
Battle between Liburnian and Picenian ships from the Novilara tablets (6th/5th century BC)

The best known Liburnian ship was their oar-propelled warship, known as a libyrnis (λιβύρνις, λιβυρνίς) to the Greeks and a liburna to the Romans.

Liburnae may have been shown in a naval battle scene carved on a stone tablet (Stele di Novilara) found near Antique Pisaurum (Pesaro) and dated to the 5th or 6th century BC. It depicts a legendary battle between the Liburnian and Picenian fleets. The liburna was presented as a light ship with one row of oars, one mast, one sail and a prow twisted outwards. Under the prow was a rostrum made for striking enemy ships under the sea.

In its original form, the liburna was similar to the Greek penteconter. It had one bench with 25 oars on each side. Later, in the time of the Roman Republic, it became a smaller version of a trireme, but with two banks of oars (a bireme), faster, lighter, and more agile than biremes and triremes. The liburnian design was adopted by the Romans and became a key part of the Roman Navy, possibly by way of the Macedonian navy, in the 2nd half of the 1st century BC. Liburnae ships played a crucial role in the naval battle of Actium in Greece, which lasted from August 31 to September 2 of 31 BC. Because of the liburna's maneuverability and the bravery of its Liburnian crews, these ships completely defeated much bigger and heavier eastern ships, quadriremes and penterames. The liburna was different from the battle triremes, quadriremes and quinqueremes — not in terms of rowing, but rather in its specific construction.

It was 109 ft (33 m) long and 16 ft (5 m) wide with a 3 ft (0.91 m) draft. Two rows of oarsmen pulled 18 oars per side. The ship could make up to 14 knots under sail and more than 7 under oars. Such a vessel, used as a merchantman, might take on a passenger, as Lycinus relates in the 2nd-century dialogue, traditionally attributed to Lucian of Samosata: "I had a speedy vessel readied, the kind of bireme used above all by the Liburnians of the Ionian Gulf."

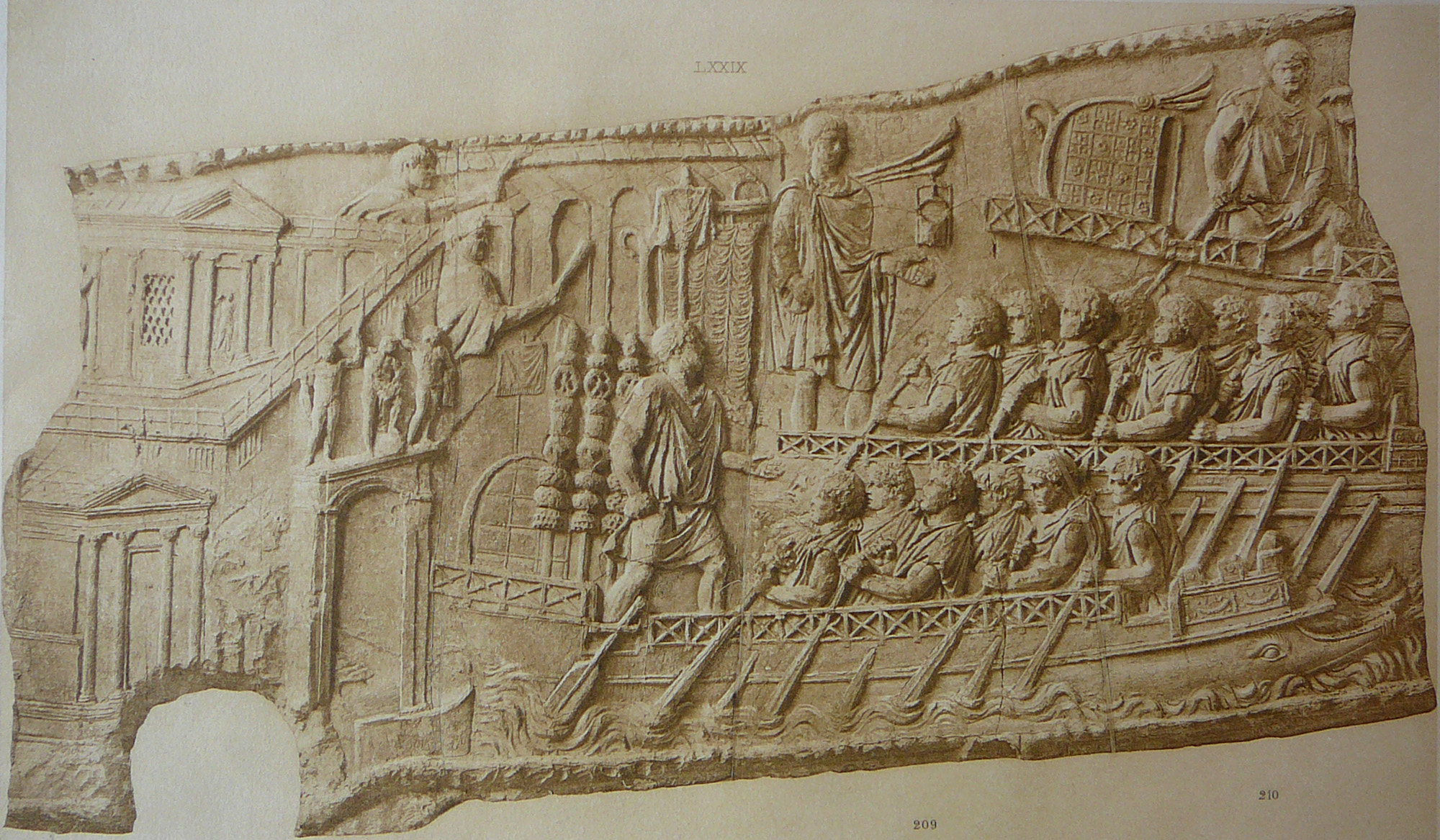
Bireme Roman warships, probably liburnians, of the Danube fleet during Trajan's Dacian Wars.

Once the Romans had adopted the liburna, they improved it. The benefits gained from the addition of rams and protection from missiles more than made up for the slight loss of speed. The ships also required that the regular Roman military unit be simplified in order to function more smoothly. Each ship operated as an individual entity, so the more complicated organization normally used was not necessary. Within the navy, there were probably liburnae of several varying sizes, all put to specific tasks such as scouting and patrolling Roman waters against piracy. The Romans made use of liburnae particularly in some provinces where they formed the bulk of the fleets, while they were included in smaller numbers in the fleets at Ravenna and Misenum where a large number of Illyrians were serving, especially Dalmatae, Liburnians and Pannonians.

Gradually liburna became a generic name for different types of Roman ships, attached also to cargo ships in later Antiquity. Tacitus and Suetonius were using it as a synonym for battle ship. In inscriptions it was mentioned as the last class of battle ships: hexeres, penteres, quadrieres, trieres, liburna.

In Medieval sources, "liburna" ships were often recorded in use by Croatian and Dalmatian pirates and sailors, probably not always referring to ships of the same form.

== Language ==
The Liburnian language is an extinct language which was spoken by the ancient Liburnians, who occupied Liburnia in classical times. Classification of the Liburnian language is not clearly established; it is reckoned as an Indo-European language with a significant proportion of the Pre-Indo-European elements from the wider area of the ancient Mediterranean. Some considered close connection to Venetic language of Adriatic Veneti, particularly on the basis of personal names and formation of nomenclature.

== Archaeogenetics ==
Two archaeogenetic studies published in Nature and Science (2022) examined 5 samples from four MBA-IA Liburnian tumuli at Velim-Kosa near Zadar. Three out of four men belonged to the Y-DNA haplogroup patrilineal line J2b2a1-L283 (> J-PH1602) with the exception of one R1b-L2. The mtDNA haplogroups fell under 2x H7, H13a2a, HV0e and T2b23. Samples from the Late Bronze Age of the Bezdanjača cave in the Lika region yielded Y-DNA R-L2.

== See also ==
- Castellieri culture

== Sources ==
- HELVII u Jaderu i Liburniji, ["Helvii in Iader and Liburnia"], Radovi - zavoda za povijesne znanosti HAZU u Zadru, 37, Zadar, 1955, 9-37.
- Liburnski cipus iz Verone (CIL 5, 2200, 8852; CIL 3, 2190), ["Liburnian cippus from Verona"], Diadora, 10, Zadar, 1988, 73-99.
- "Prilog klasifikaciji liburnskih nadgrobnih spomenika, tzv. liburnskih cipusa - sjeverna grupa nalaza," ["Contribution to classification of Liburnian gravestones, so called cipuses - northern group of findings"], Izdanja HAD-a, 13, Arheoloska istrazivanja na otocima Krku, Rabu i u Hrvatskom primorju, Zagreb, 1989, 51-59.
- "Aserijatska skupina liburnskih nadgrobnih spomenika, tzv. liburnskih cipusa," ["Asseriate group of Liburnian gravestones, so called cippi"], Diadora, 12: 209-299, Zadar, 1990; Diadora, 13, Zadar, 1991, 169-211.
- Barac, L. (2003). "Y-chromosomal heritage of Croatian population and its island isolates". European Journal of Human Genetics. 11 (7): 535–542. doi:10.1038/sj.ejhg.5200992. ISSN 1018-4813. PMID 12825075. S2CID 15822710.
- Barnett, Charles (2016). "Promišljanja o identitetu, etnicitetu i "helenizaciji" predrimske Liburnije" [Rethinking Identity, Ethnicity, and "Hellenization" in pre-Roman Liburnia]. Miscellanea Hadriatica et Mediterranea (in Croatian and English). 3: 63–98. doi:10.15291/misc.1367.
- Batović, Šime (1962). Sepultures de la peuplade illyrienne des Liburnes (in French). Bonn: R. Habelt. OCLC 714943089.
- Batović, Šime (1965). "Die Eisenzeit auf dem Gebiet des illyrischen Stammes der Liburnen" [The Iron Age on the territory of the Illyrian tribe of the Liburnians]. Archaeologia Jugoslavica (in German). 6: 55.
- Brusic, Zdenko, Hellenistic and Roman Relief Pottery in Liburnia ISBN 1-84171-030-X. British Archaeological Reports (December 8, 1999), 254 pages, 122 plates of drawings and photographs.
- Krahe, Hans (1946). "Die illyrische Naniengebung (Die Götternamen)" (PDF). Jarhbücher f. d. Altertumswiss (in German). pp. 199–204. S2CID 54995190. Archived (PDF) from the original on 2019-03-07.
- Kurilić, Anamarija (2012). "Nationes Liburnus - identitet naroda i pojedinca" [Nationes Liburnus - the identity of the nation and the individual]. Povijesni prilozi (in Croatian). 33 (44): 171–181.
- Suić, Mate (1992). "Liburnija i Liburni u vrijeme velikog ustanka u Iliriku od 6. do 9. god. poslije Krista (uz CIL V 3346)" [Liburnia and Liburni at the time of the great uprising in Illyricum from the 6th to the 9th year. after Christ (with CIL V 3346)]. Vjesnik Arheološkog muzeja u Zagrebu (in Croatian). 24–25 (1): 55–66.
- Šašel Kos, Marjeta (2005). Appian and Illyricum. Narodni muzej Slovenije. ISBN 961-6169-36-X – via Google Books.
- Tolk, H.V. et al., "MtDNA haplogroups in the populations of Croatian Adriatic Islands." Coll. Anthropologica 24: 267-279, 2000.
- Wilkes, John J. (1996) [1992]. The Illyrians. The peoples of Europe. Blackwell Books. ISBN 0-631-14671-7. OCLC 438825468.
- Zaninović, Marin (1988), "Liburnia Militaris", Opvscvla Archaeologica (in Croatian), 13 (1): 43–67, ISSN 0473-0992 UDK 904.930.2(497.13)
