= Iapodes =

Ancient Illyrian tribe

Iapodes territory in ca 5th century BC

The Iapodes (or Iapydes, Japodes; Greek: Ἰάποδες and Ἰάπυδες; Serbo-Croatian: Japodi) were an ancient Illyrian people who dwelt north of and inland from the Liburnians, off the Adriatic coast and eastwards of the Istrian peninsula. They occupied the interior of the country between the Colapis (Kupa) and Oeneus (Una) rivers, and the Velebit mountain range (Mons Baebius) which separated them from the coastal Liburnians. Their territory covered the central inlands of modern Croatia and Una River Valley in today's Bosnia and Herzegovina. Archaeological documentation confirms their presence in these countries at least from 9th century BC, and they persisted in their area longer than a millennium. The ancient written documentation on inland Iapodes is scarcer than on the adjacent coastal peoples (Liburni, Delmatae, etc.) that had more frequent maritime contacts with ancient Greeks and Romans.

The Iapodes had their maximal development and territorial expansion from the 8th to 4th centuries BC. They settled mostly in inland mountain valleys between Pannonia and the coastal Adriatic basin, but in disputation with southern Liburni they periodically reached also the northern Adriatic coast at Vinodol valley (classical Valdevinum).

Knowledge of the Iapodes' culture is largely nebulous due to a lack of material evidence. The Iapodes are believed to have been Illyrians, probably a subgroup of Pannonians, or a mixed group with connections to the Pannonians, Celts, and/or Veneti.

A major scholar of the Japodi was archaeologist Branka Raunig.

== Origin and affinity ==
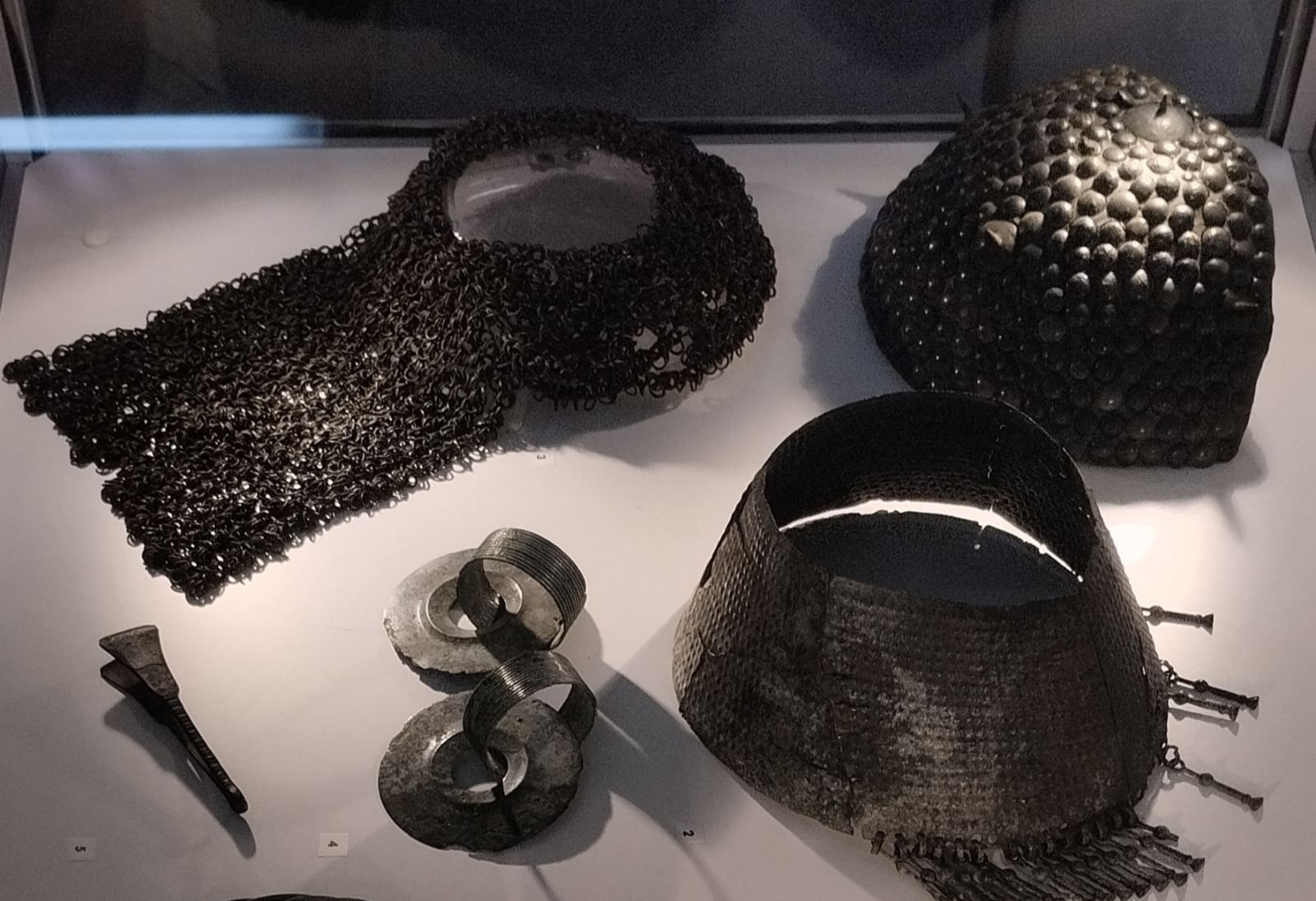
Iapodian metalwork

The exact origin of early Iapodes is uncertain; archaeological documentation suggests mixed affinities to early Pannonii and other Illyrians. The first written mention of an Illyrian tribe is from Greek writers from the 6th century BC. They are provisionally described by Strabo as a mixed race of Celts and Illyrians, who used Celtic weapons, tattooed themselves, and lived chiefly on spelt and millet; however, Strabo's suggestion of a mixed Celtic-Illyrian Iapodes culture is not confirmed by archaeology. Originally, Iapodes existed at least from the 9th century BC, and Celtic influence reached the region in the 4th century BC when Iapodes entered a decline. Archeological evidence of typical Celtic culture is documented only in the marginal contact zone of the Iapodes and the Celtic Taurisci along the Kupa river valley (now the Slovenian-Croatian border). Elsewhere, and especially in the main Iapodian area of the Lika highlands in Croatia, definite Celtic artifacts are scarce and explicable merely by commercial exchanges.

=== Archaeogenetics ===
An archaeogenetic study published in Nature (2022) examined 8 samples from three Early Iron Age Iapodes sites. All five tested men belonged to the Y-DNA haplogroup patrilineal line J2b2a1-L283 (> J-Y86930), the key lineage of Dalmatian and Pannonian Illyrians, while no line had affinities to incoming Celts from the Danubian basin or the eastern Alps. The mtDNA haplogroups fell under H, H1, 2x H3b, H5, T2a1a, T2b and U5a1g.

== Roman conquest ==
Romans said of the Iapodes that they were a warlike race addicted to plundering expeditions, but other archaeological documentation confirms their main economical activity was mining and metallurgy. That attracted the pragmatic Romans to conquer their country, whose river valleys were also a natural way for strategic communications between the Adriatic and Pannonia. Therefore, induced conflicts started from 171 BC, when consul Gaius Cassius Longinus first attacked Iapodes. In 129 BC, Gaius Sempronius Tuditanus attacked the Iapodes and was nearly defeated, but Decimus Iunius Brutus arrived and rescued him, and he celebrated a triumph. Lucius Aurelius Cotta and Gaius Caecilius Metellus undertook another expedition against the Iapodes in 119, which concluded with a triumph in 117. In 78–76 BC they were also attacked by Gaius Cosconius as part of a war against the Dalmatians. They had a foedus from 56 BC with Rome and paid a tributum, but then from 52–47 BC rebelled. In 34 BC they were finally conquered by Augustus Caesar. Then they conserved a partial autonomy with a domestic praepositus Iapodum.

== Culture and society ==
Due to the rich and extensive forests of their mountainous country, their houses were mostly wooden huts, and they rarely used stone constructions except in some major fortifications. Their settlements were mostly on hilltops, including between 400–3,000 dwellers, and the main Iapodian settlements in Roman times were Metulum, Terpon, Arupium and Avendo.

They cultivated chiefly cereals and grapes, and kept varied cattle. Their early metallurgy developed a half millennium before Celtic influence that induced here minor modifications. Their society was simple including warriors, villagers, herdsmen, miners, and metalworkers. In that early phase neither leaders nor elite were indicated, and these independent Iapodes had no detectable collective political organisation. Under the Romans, a Romanized elite emerged, led by the praepositus Iapodum installed by Romans.

Their classical culture was a varied mixture of Pannonian, Illyrian, Greek and Roman influences, mostly without proper peculiarities. Their figural art included the frequent metal decorations in the form of triangles and spirals, and large amber pearls and amber figurines. The Iapodian language before the Romans is mostly unknown: the only indications available are their toponyms and necropolis inscriptions from Roman times. These scarce onomastic indications suggest the Iapodian tongue may be correlated with other Illyrian and Pannonian tribes. During their independence, the Iapodes appear to have been completely illiterate and left no inscriptions before the Roman conquest.

== Religion ==
The original religion of Iapodes is scarcely known, and it appears to be similar with other eastward Illyrians. They knew the divine pair of water-deities Vidassus (as Roman Sylvanus) and Thana (as Roman Diana), whose rocky reliefs persist today at some springs in their area. They worshiped the holy horse as their tribal totem, and also the holy snakes as the symbol of their ancestors. Their early tombs were usually in caves, and then in Roman times often in wooden sarcophagi and also incinerated in ceramic urns.

Japodian burial urns were art a unique form influenced to a degree by the Situla art of northern Illyria and Italy and by Greek art.

== Gallery ==
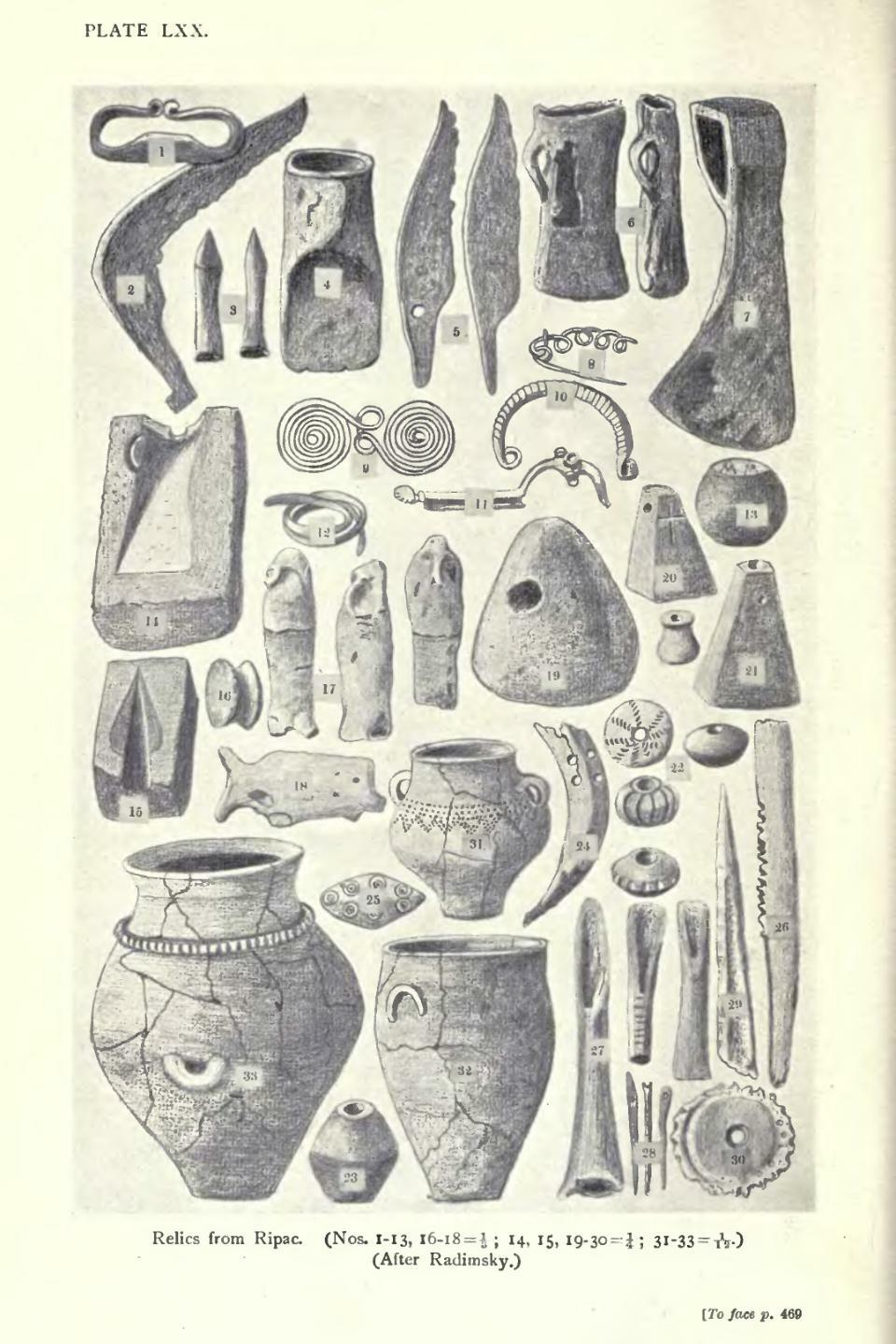
Iapodian ceramics and metalwork

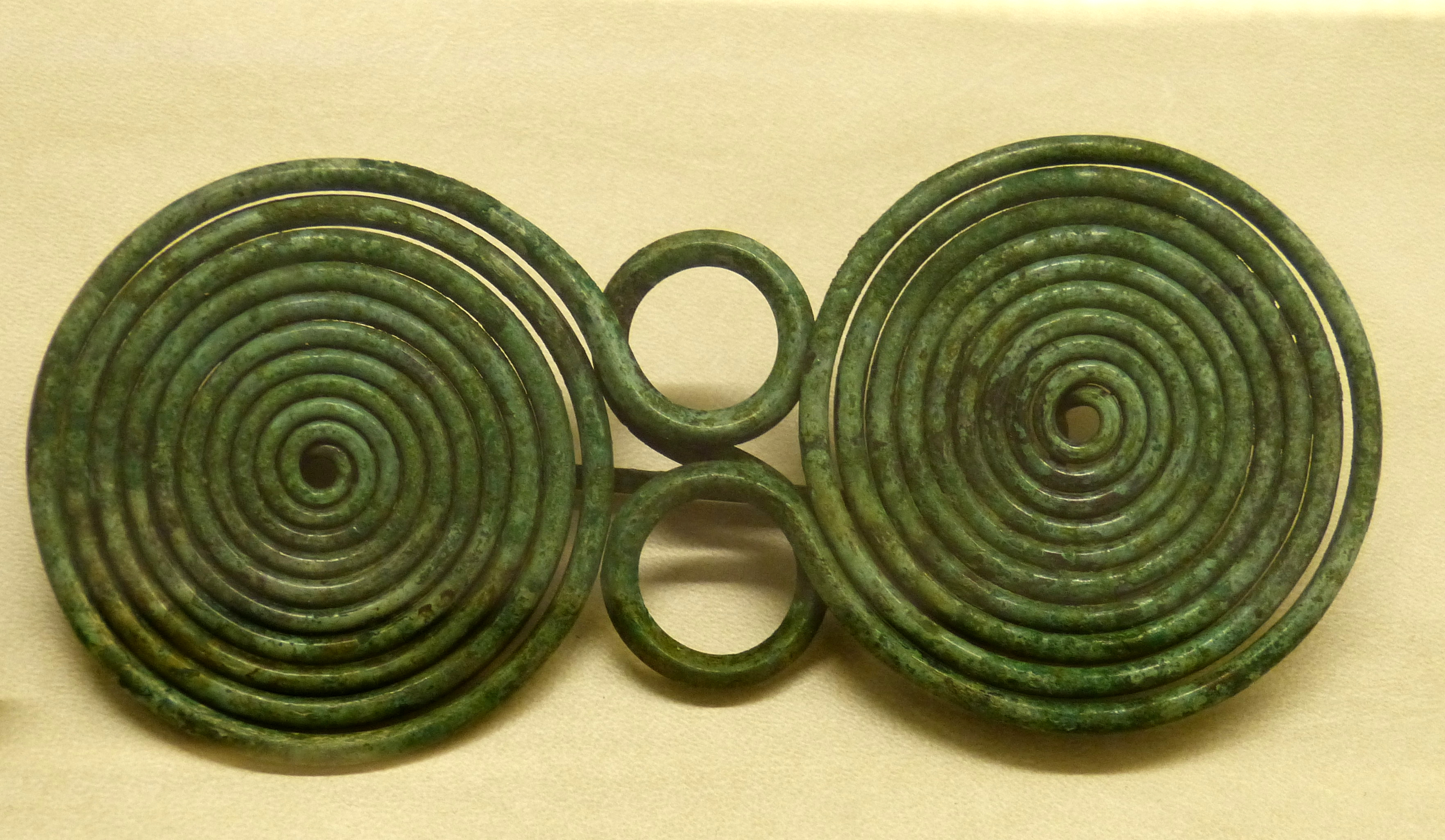
Pre-Roman bronze spiral booch

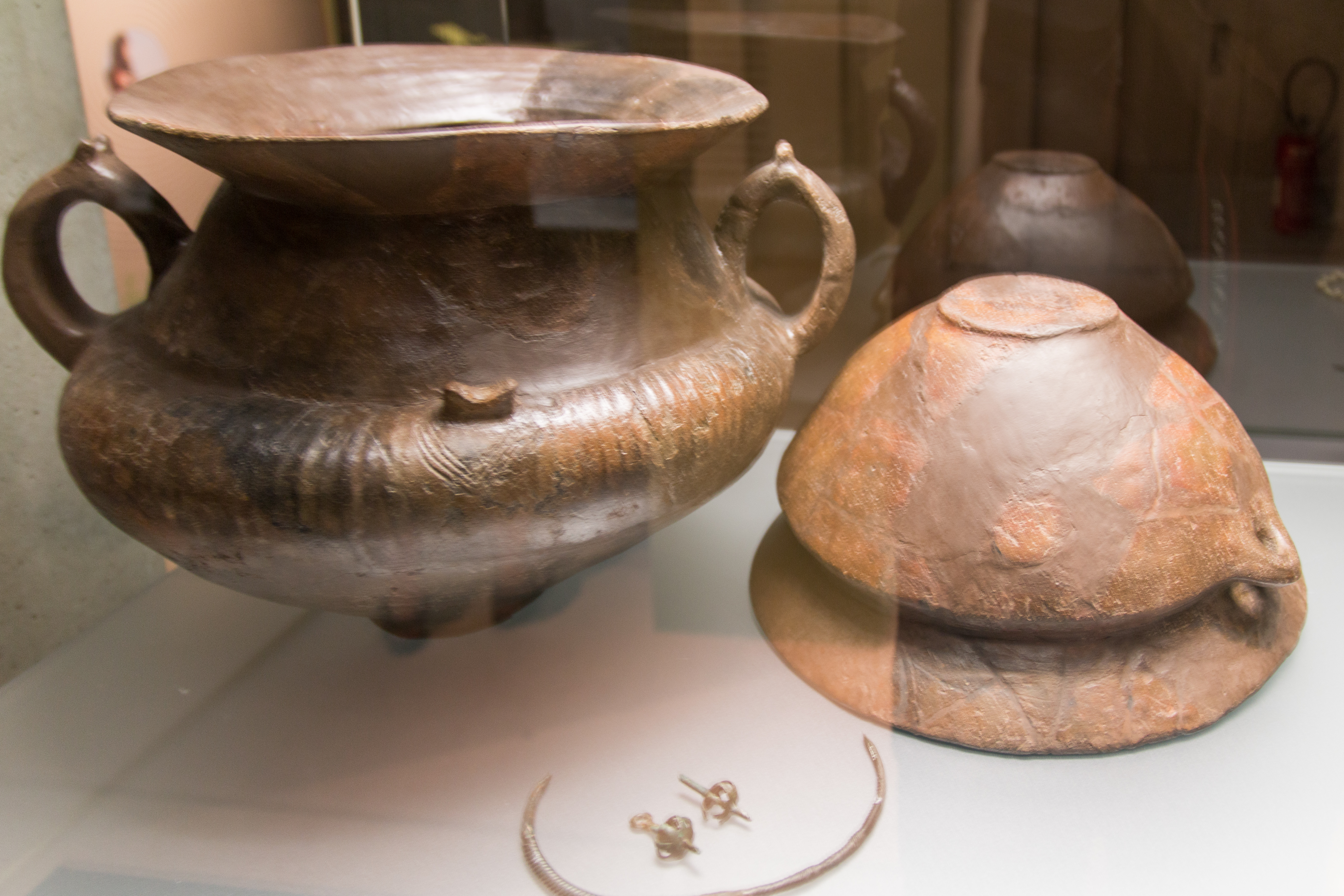
Fluted urn and lid with jewellery, 8th century BC.

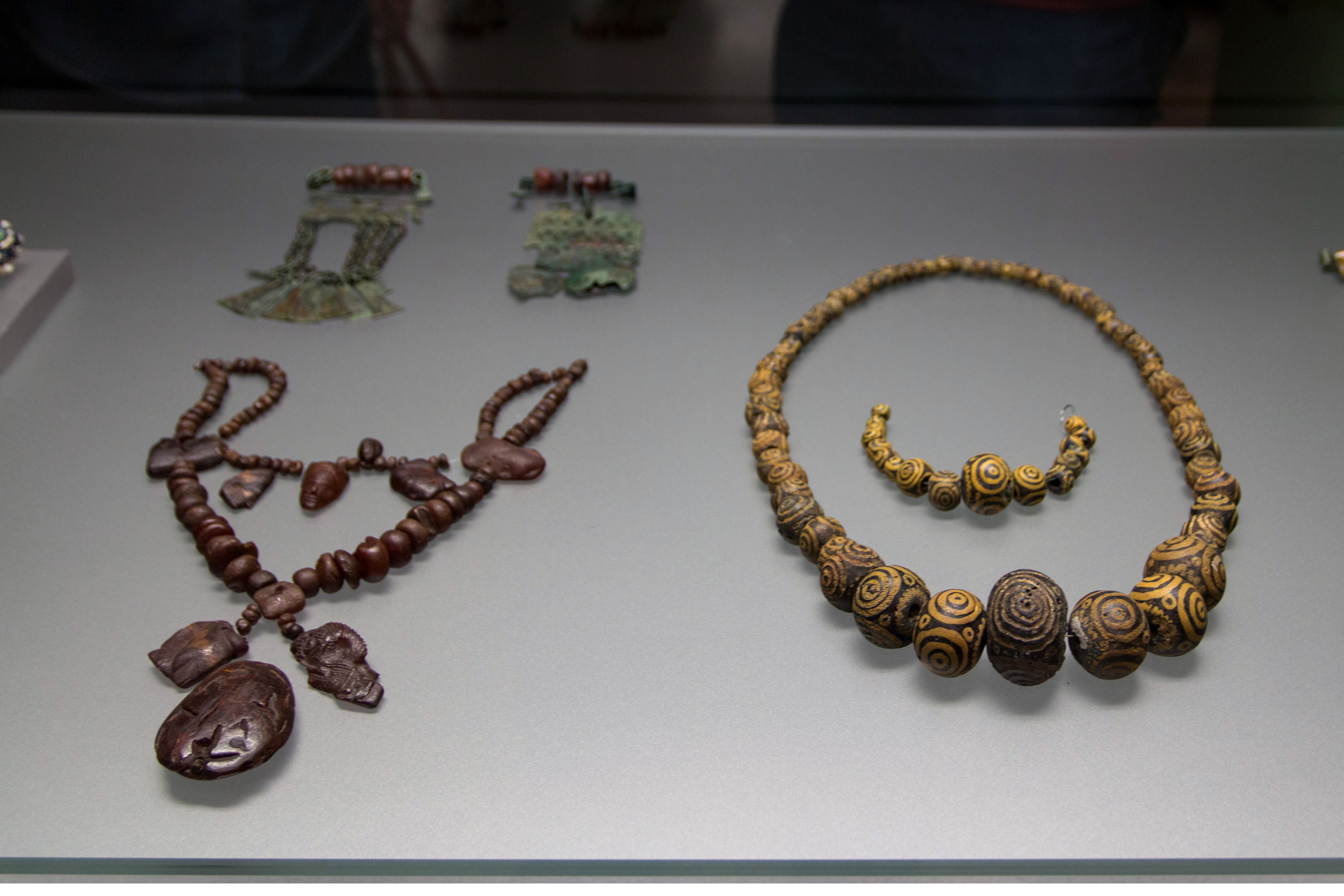
Necklaces, Early Iron Age, VI th-V th centuries BC).

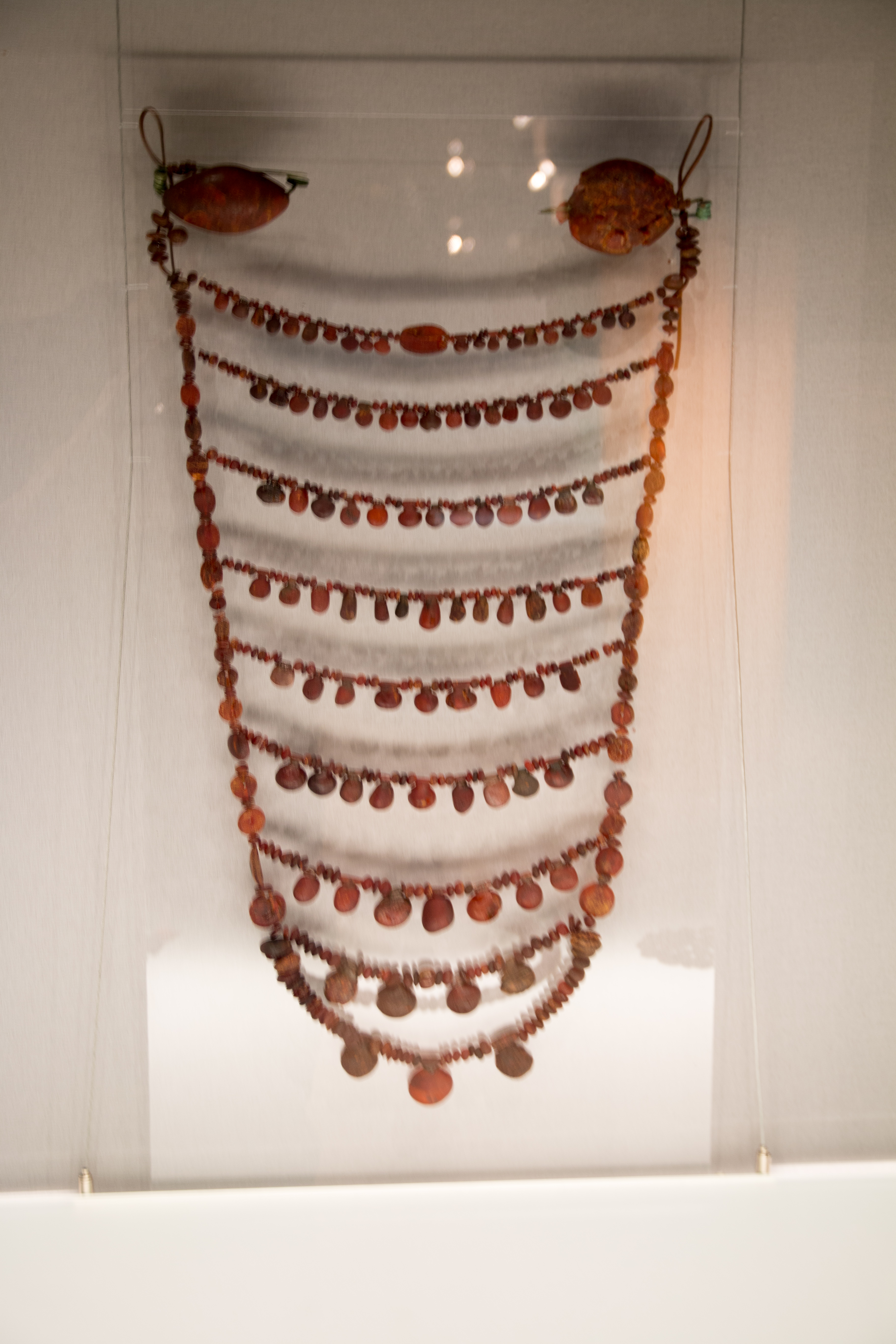
Pectoral of amber beads.

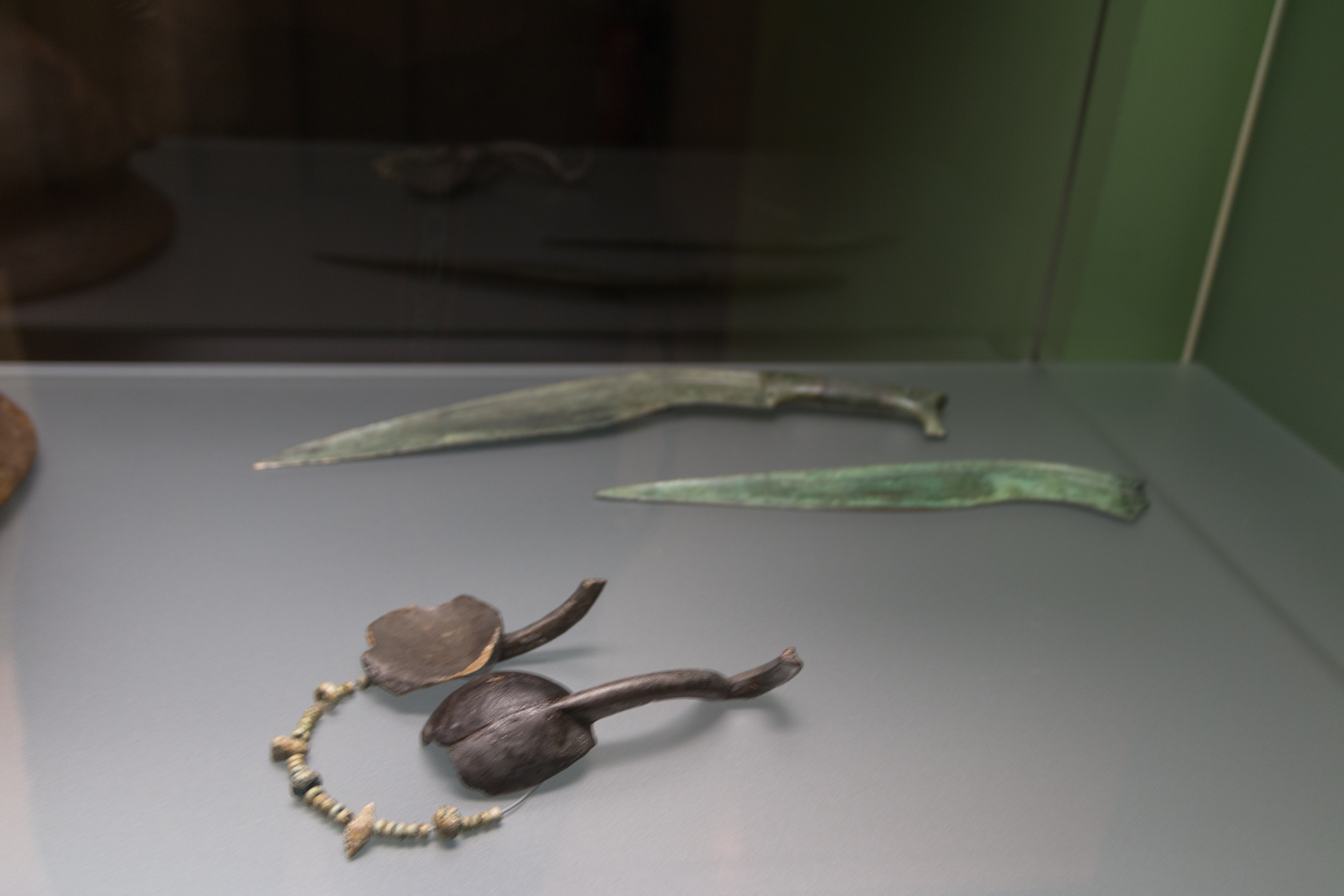
Artefacts from the Grave of Gospić-Lipe, late Bronze Age, Eighth century BC.

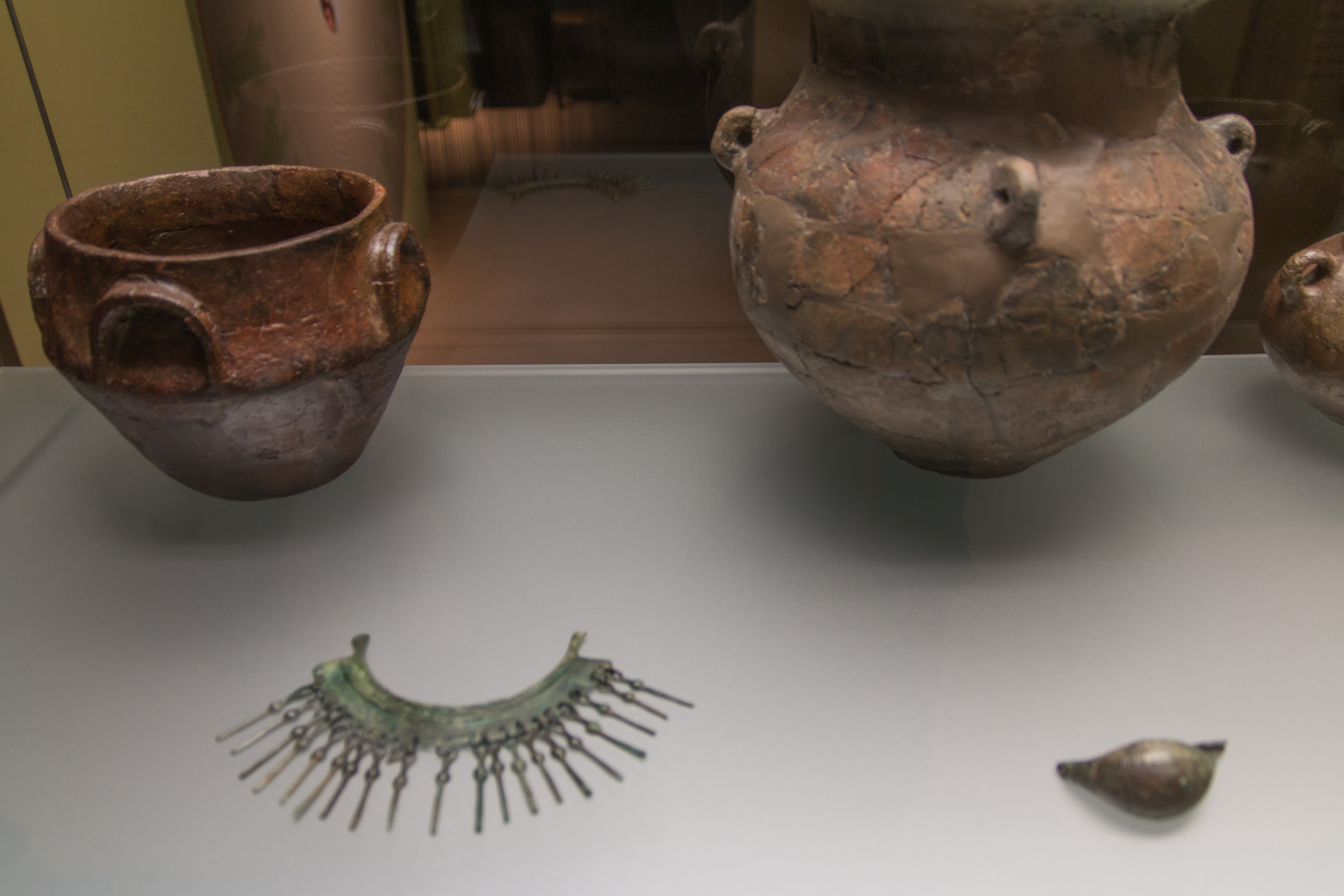
Potteries and fibula from the Grave of Gospić-Lipe, late Bronze Age, Eighth century BC.

== See also ==
- Lika
- Bindus (Illyrian god)

== Sources ==
- Mitja Gustin et al.: Keltoi in Yugoslavia (Die Kelten und ihre Zeitgenossen auf dem Gebiet Jugoslawiens). Narodni muzej, Ljubljana 1984.
- Radoslav Katicic: Zur Frage der keltischen und pannonischen Namengebiete im römischen Dalmatien. Godisnjak (Annuaire) 3, 55 p., Centar za balkanoloske studije, Sarajevo 1965.
