= Promona =

Ancient city in Illyria

Promona was an ancient city of the Illyrians in the territory of the Delmatae. It is located near the modern-day village of Tepljuh, north of Drnis.

In 34 BC the Dalmatians, who had been rebellious since their rout by the troops of Aulus Gabinius in 48 BC, rose in revolt. Octavian went to suppress them but the Dalmatians had up to 12,000 troops led by Versus, who had seized Promona from the Liburnians and fortified it even though it was a mountain stronghold.

Versus placed the bulk of his forces in the city and distributed the rest on the nearby hills to obstruct the Roman advance. Octavian began to build a wall in the plain around the town and hills which reached a length of seven kilometres. After a series of battles the Romans were victorious.

Promona was later garrisoned by a Roman cohort.

== See also ==
- List of settlements in Illyria

== Bibliography ==
- Wilkes, J. J. The Illyrians, 1992, ISBN 0-631-19807-5

43.895954°N 16.213713°E
