= Micro Cupper World Championships =

International sailing regatta

The Micro Cupper World Championship is international sailing regatta in the Micro Cupper class organized by the host club on behalf of International Micro Cupper Class Association and recognized by the World Sailing. The event origins date back to 1977 but has officially been running annually since 1999.

== Editions ==
Edition			Host			Boats	Sailors					Ref.
Ed.	Date	Year	Host club	Location	Nat.	Boats	No.	Male	Fem.	Nats	Cont.	Ref.
1	16-21 Aug	1999		Gdynia	Poland							
2	19Jun -4Jul	2000		Warnemünde	Germany	32				8+	3+	
3	12-18 Aug	2001		Maubuisson	France	58				8+	2+	
4	17-12 Aug	2002		Achensee	Austria	46	138			10	3	
5	12-17 Aug	2003		Łeba	Poland	30				6+	1+	
6	11-17 Jul	2004		Nieuwpoort	Belgium	36	108			8	1	
7	14-20 Aug	2005		Lake Usma		33	97			5	1	
8	19-26 Aug	2006		Mèze - Etang de Thau,	France	62	186			8	1	
9	7-14 Jul	2007		Warnemünde	Germany	40	120			9	1	
10	28Jun -5Jul	2008		Sopot	Poland	44	132			7	2	
11	8-16 Aug	2009		Moscow Pirogovo	Russia	72	214			12	3	
12	14-22 Aug	2010		Saint-Pierre Quiberon	France	65	195			9	2	
13	14-20 Aug	2011		Lake Usma	Latvia	53	159			7	1	
14	20-25 Aug	2012		Gmunden, Traunsee	Austria	47	135			11	2	
15	20-27 Jul	2013	Polish Yachting Association	Gdynia	Poland	46	138			9	2	
16	19-26 Jul	2014	Segler-Club Gothia e.V.	Berlin	Germany	55	164			10	1	
17		2015		Brest	France	63	189	54	6	12	1	
18	11-19 Jun	2016	Pskovskaya regatta		Russia	42	127			8	1	
19		2017	Société des Régates à Voile d'Annecy	Lake Annecy	France	68	199	177	22	9	2	
20		2018		Świnoujście	Poland	25	75			7	1	
21	17-24 Aug	2019		Bobrovnik, Chocske hills	Slovakia	36				4+	1+	
N/A	25-29 Aug	2020		Gdynia	Poland	CANCELLED COVID						
N/A	-	2021	CV Martigues	Etang de Berre	France	MADE A EUROPEANS DUE TO COVID						
22	-	2022	Club Velico Castiglionese	Castiglione del lago	Italy	32				7+	2+	
23	-	2023	Segelclub Ebensee	Ebensee am Traunsee	Austria	27	79			6	1	
24	24-30 Aug	2024	Cercle de la Voile de Bordeaux	Maubuisson,Carcans, Gironde	France	61	177	148	29	5	2	
25	-	2025		Gdynia	Poland	13	39	34	5	5	2	

== Multiple World champions ==
Table based on the data below includes up to the 2025 World Championship (*) full results for every year are not available so these are minimums attendances

Ranking	Sailor	Gold	Silver	Bronze	Total	No. Entries (*)
1	Piotr Tarnacki (POL)	13	2	4	19	20
2	Grzegorz Banaszczyk (POL)	8	1	0	9	17
3	Piotr Ogrodnik (POL)	5	2	0	7	7
4	Piotr Petryla (POL)	4	1	0	5	5
5	Jerzy Chodubski (POL)	4	0	1	5	8
6	Przemysław Tarnacki (POL)	3	0	0	3	4
6	Bartosz Makala (POL)	3	0	0	3	3
8	Krzysztof Mongird (POL)	2	1	1	4	4
9	Stanisław Sawko (POL)	2	1	0	3	3
10	Andrey Bill (RUS)	2	0	2	4	7
11	Lukasz Wosinski (POL)	2	0	1	3	3
12	Bohdan Goralski (POL)	2	0	0	2	8
12	Piotr Przybylski (POL)	2	0	0	2	2

== Medalists ==
Year	Gold	Silver	Bronze
1999	Stanisław Sawko (POL) Kazimierz Domalewski (POL); Przemysław Tarnacki (POL)		
2000	POL 77 - Hempel Protection; L’Arte Przemysław Tarnacki (POL); Michał Szmul (POL); Marcin Ossowski (POL)	POL 55 - Hempel; L’Arte Stanisław Sawko (POL); UNKNOWN; UNKNOWN	FRA 4183 - Briska III; Lucas Marcel Krauth (FRA); UNKNOWN; UNKNOWN
2001	POL 55 - Hempel; L'Arte Stanisław Sawko (POL); Tarnacki Piotr (POL); Wysocki Jacek (POL)	FRA 13619 - Platypus; Shanta Philippe Benaben (FRA); UNKNOWN; UNKNOWN	FRA 4183 - Briska III; Lucas Marcel Krauth (FRA); UNKNOWN; UNKNOWN
2002	FRA 18267 - L'Arte; Platypus 2 Philippe Benaben (FRA); Matthieu Loiselet (FRA); Rémi Nobileau (FRA)	AUT 44 - L'Arte; Siebdruck Fazokas Alexander Kastinger (AUT); JohannFazokas (AUT); Martin Sauer (AUT)	FRA 4000 - Lucas; Liberté Robert Humbert (FRA); Nicolas Michel (FRA); Corinne Nobileau (FRA)
2003	POL 55 - L'Arte Przemysław Tarnacki (POL); Michał Szmul (POL); Jacek Wysocki (POL)	POL 58 - Prim; L'Arte Andrzej Czapski (POL); UNKNOWN; UNKNOWN	POL 77 - L'Arte Piotr Tarnacki (POL); UNKNOWN; UNKNOWN
2004	POL 77 - Soncas; L'Arte Piotr Tarnacki (POL); Jerzy Chodubski (POL); Lukasz Wosinski (POL)	FRA 4183 - Briska III; Lucas Marcel Krauth (FRA); MarcKrauth (FRA); Fabrice Beigneux (FRA)	AUT 44 - Siebdruck Fazokas; L'Arte Florian Kruse (AUT); Johan Fazokas (AUT); Martin Sauer (AUT)
2005	POL 77 - Soncas - Willa Höpfer; L'Arte Piotr Tarnacki (POL); Jerzy Chodubski (POL); Lukasz Wosinski (POL)	RUS 77 - Home Hotel; L'Arte Viatcheslav Frolov (RUS); MaximTaranov (RUS); Filip Szawtowski (RUS)	RUS 174 - Elena; L'Arte 2 Jevgenyi Nikoforov (RUS); Jury Melesin (RUS); Andrej Paduchin (RUS)
2006	FRA-4183 - Briska III; Lucas Marcel Krauth (FRA); Marc Krauth (FRA); Fabrice Beigneux (FRA)	RUS-77 - Home Hotel; L'Arte Viatcheslav Frolov (RUS); Maxim Taranov (RUS); Mariusz Klupinski (RUS)	POL-77 - Toyota; L'Arte Piotr Tarnacki (POL); Jerzy Chodubski (POL); Lukasz Wosinski (POL)
2007	POL-77 - Soncas; L'Arte Piotr Tarnacki (POL); Jerzy Chodubski (POL); Bohdan Goralski (POL)	RUS-174 - Elena; L'Arte II Evgenyi Nikiforov (RUS); Yuri Firsov (RUS); Aleksey Bunzva (RUS)	RUS-77 - Home Hotel; L'Arte Viatcheslav Frolov (RUS); Sergejs Filatovs (RUS); Andris Zjatkovs (RUS)
2008	POL-77 - Apia; L’Arte 3 Piotr Tarnacki (POL); Jerzy Chodubski (POL); Bohdan Goralski (POL)	RUS-77 - Home Hotel; L’Arte Viatcheslav Frolov (RUS); Maxim Taranov (RUS); Sergejs Filatovs (LAT)	FRA-4000 - Liberté; Lucas Robert Humbert (FRA); Blandine Gallois (FRA); Hervé Chastel (FRA)
2009	RUS-711 - Monte Cristo; Ricochet 559 Evgeniy Neugodnikov (RUS); Andrey Bill (RUS); Alexandr Ekimov (RUS)	RUS-174 - Elena; L'Arte 2 Evgenyi Nikiforov (RUS); Dmitriy Lukyanov (RUS); Pavel Brednev (RUS)	RUS-15 - COULD BE RUSSM7 Alfa; Ricochet 559 Sergey Musikhin (RUS); Kirill Luzin (RUS); Yury Popov (RUS)
2010	RUS-1117 - Monte Cristo; SM550 Andrey Bill (RUS); Maxim Taranov (RUS); Mikhail Tekuchev (RUS)	POL-77 - Toyota Klif; L’Arte 3 Piotr Tarnacki (POL); Rafał Becker (POL); Artur Manista (POL)	RUS-140 - Spartak; Ricochet 559 Maxim Kuzmin (RUS); Dmitryi Malishev (RUS); Ivan Kolinko (RUS)
2011	POL-77 - Toyota Nina; L’Arte 3 Piotr Tarnacki (POL); Rafał Becker (POL); Krzysztof Mongird (POL)	FRA-13645 - Pangolin; Europa Nicolas Pierrot (FRA); Sébastien Liagre (FRA); Michael Risselin (FRA)	RUS-1117 - Bioges – Monte Cristo; SM550 Andrey Bill (RUS); Mikhail Tekuchev (RUS); Maxim Taranov (RUS)
2012	POL-90 - stawo.pl Flyer Proto Piotr Ogrodnik (POL); Grzegorz Banaszczyk (POL); Paweł Choroba (POL)	POL-77 - Toyota Klif; L’Arte 3.2 Piotr Tarnacki (POL); Rafał Becker (POL); Krzysztof Mongird (POL)	RUS-39 - Crystal-Spa; L’Arte 4 Gennadiy Svistunov (RUS); Grigorii Mikhalev (RUS); Oleg Eropunov (RUS)
2013	POL-77 Piotr Tarnacki (POL); Rafal Becker (POL); Krzysztof Mongird (POL)	POL-90 Piotr Ogrodnik (POL); Piotr Petryla (POL); Grzegorz Banaszczyk (POL)	POL-290 Marcin Celmerowski (POL); Wojciech Moczkowski (POL); Oskar Sleziona (POL)
2014	POL-90; Flyer Piotr Ogrodnik (POL); Piotr Petryla (POL); Grzegorz Banaszczyk (POL)	RUS-39 Gennadiy Svistunov (RUS); Grigorii Mikhalev (RUS); Igor Kornalevskiy (RUS)	POL-77 Piotr Tarnacki (POL); Jakub Pawluk (POL); Krzysztof Mongird (POL)
2015	POL-109 - STAWO.PL; Flyer Piotr Ogrodnik (POL); Grzegorz Banaszczyk (POL); Piotr Petryla (POL)	RUS-39 - CRYSTAL Gennadiy Svistunov (RUS); Grigorii Mikhalev (RUS); Igor Kornalevskiy (RUS)	POL-77 - ROCA Piotr Tarnacki (POL); Marcin Celmerowski (POL); Rafal Becker (POL)
2016	POL-109 - STAWO PL; POL Piotr Ogrodnik (POL); Grzegorz Banaszczyk (POL); Piotr Petryla (POL)	LTU-117 - MONTE KRISTO; LTU Igor Lipen (LTU); Maxim Taranov (RUS); Dmitry Kolesnikov (LTU)	RUS-505 - POLITNIK; RUS Andrey Astapenkov (RUS); Alexandr Osipov (RUS); Andrey Kuzmin (RUS)
2017	POL-77 - ROCA-STAWO; Flyer Piotr Tarnacki (POL); Grzegorz Banaszczyk (POL); Bartosz Makala (POL)	POL-101 - NR1JAJA2 WOLNEGO WYBIEGU Piotr Ogrodnik (POL); Tomasz Brzozowski (POL); Pawel Choroba (POL)	FRA-4980 - KUMPELKA Maxime Brunel (FRA); Lionnel Tissot (FRA); Lucas Tissot (FRA)
2018	POL-77; Flyer Piotr Tarnacki (POL); Grzegorz Banaszczyk (POL); Bartosz Makała (POL)	POL-333 Rafał Sawicki (POL); Joanna Marianska (POL); Krzysztof Marianski (POL)	RUS-771 Vladimir Bazhenov (RUS); Andrey Babushkin (RUS); Andrey Bill (RUS)
2019	POL-77 - Proto; Flyer Piotr Tarnacki (POL); Bartosz Makala (POL); Grzegorz Banaszczyk (POL)	POL-290 - Proto Marcon Celmerowski (POL); Wojciech Moxzkowski (POL); Oskar Sleziona (POL)	RUS-771 - Proto Vladimir Baxhenov (RUS); Andrey Babushkin (RUS); Andrey Kuzmin (RUS)
2020	COVID		
2021	COVID		
2022	POL-77 - PROTO Piotr Tarnacki (POL); UNKNOWN; UNKNOWN	POL-123 - PROTO Piotr Manczak (POL); UNKNOWN; UNKNOWN	ITA-125 - PROTO Lorenzo Carloia (ITA); Luca Coppetti (ITA); Stefano Garzi (ITA)
2023	POL-77; Flyer Piotr Tarnacki (POL); Piotr Przybylski (POL); Kasia Goralska (POL)	FRA-21947 Gaetan Mieulet (FRA); Jonathan Commissaire (FRA); Francois Salengros (FRA)	POL-123 Piotr Mańczak (POL); Natalia Moszczynski (POL); Bartek Jedrychowicz (POL)
2024	STAWO.PL; Piotr Ogrodnik (POL); Grzegorz Banaszczyk (POL); Piotr Petryla (POL)	POLSTER; Piotr Manczak (POL); Ryszard Chybinski (POL); Jacek Kuczynski (POL)	HURLE VENT- TECHNAL; Gaetan Mieulet (FRA); Jonathan Commissaire (FRA); François Salengros (FRA)
2025	POL-77 Piotr Tarnacki (POL); Maciej Grzebita (POL); Piotr Przybylski (POL)	POL-123 Piotr Mańczak (POL); Jacek Kuczyński (POL); Bartek Peczka (POL)	POL-70 Tomasz Szychowiak (POL); Maciej Ruwiński (POL); Łukasz Paszko (POL)

== See also ==
- World championships in sailing
- World Sailing
