= Archaeological open-air museum =

Museum with outdoor architectural reconstructions

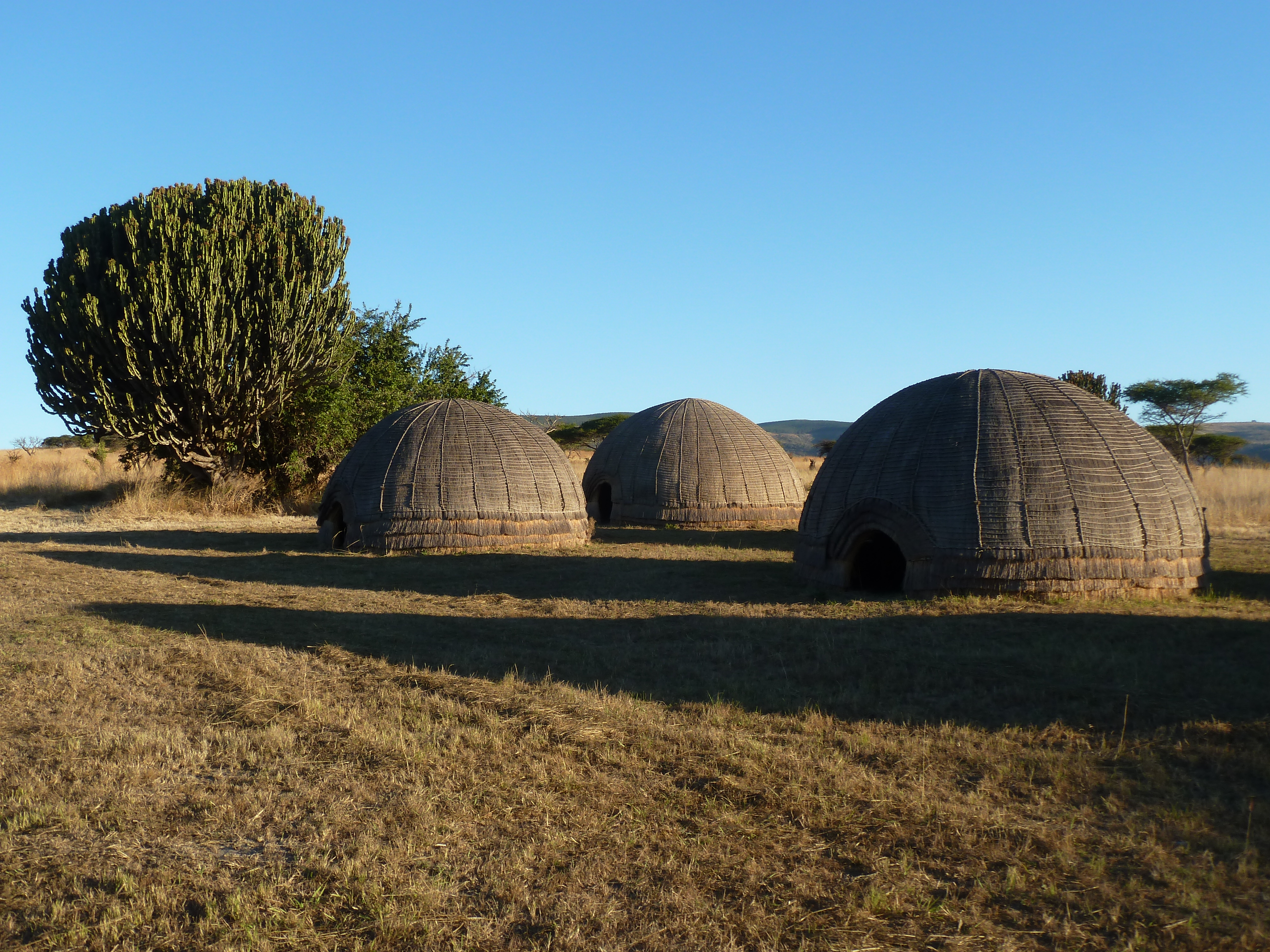
Reconstructed amaQhugwane, at uMgungundlovu in South Africa

An archaeological open-air museum is a non-profit permanent institution with outdoor true-to-scale architectural reconstructions primarily based on archaeological sources. It holds collections of intangible heritage resources and provides an interpretation of how people lived and acted in the past; this is accomplished according to sound scientific methods for the purposes of education, study and enjoyment of its visitors.

== Components ==
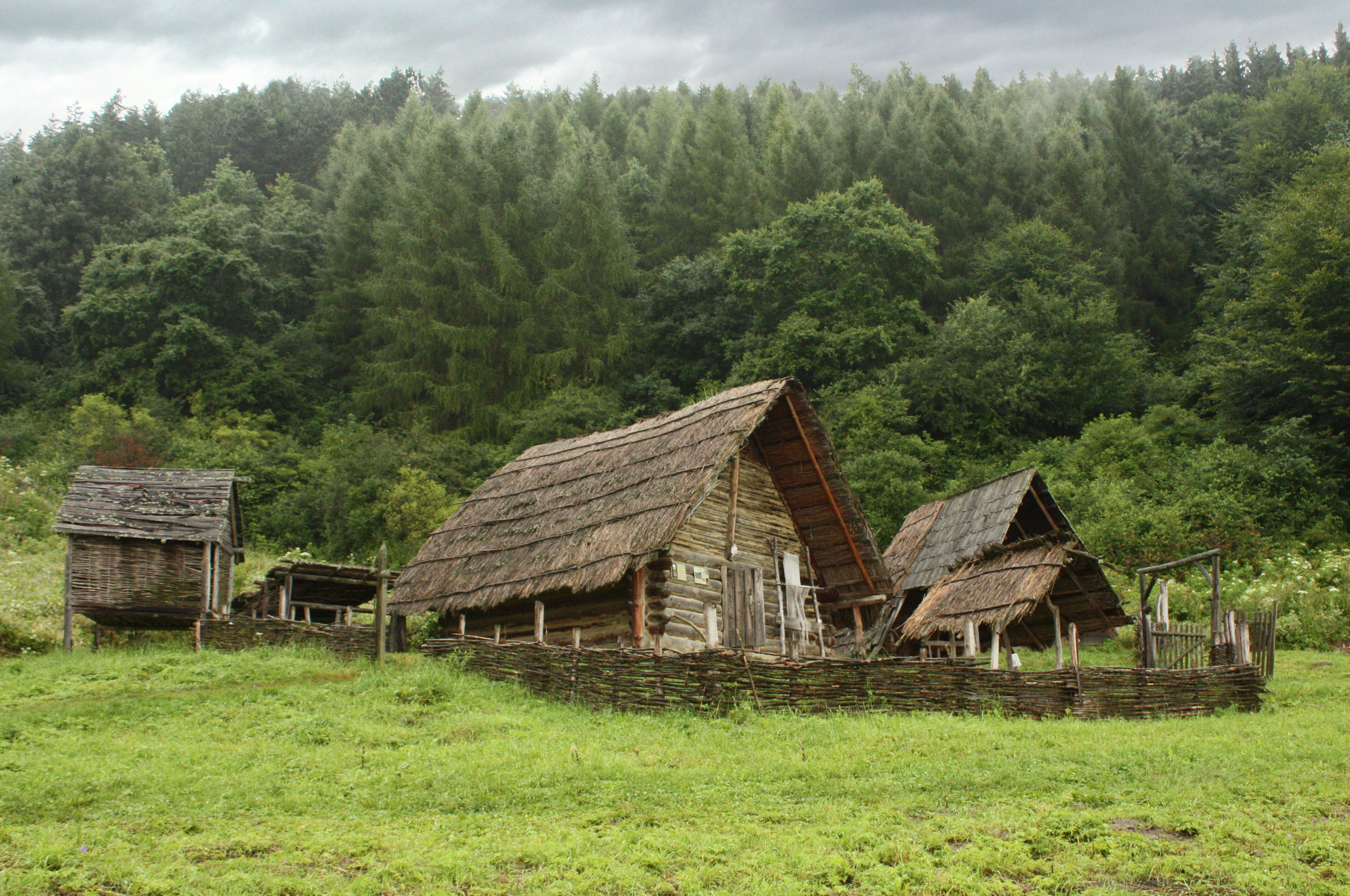
Archaeological Open-Air Museum Liptovska Mara – Havránok, Slovakia, Reconstructed shape of a farmstead from the Upper Iron Age (300-100 B.C.)

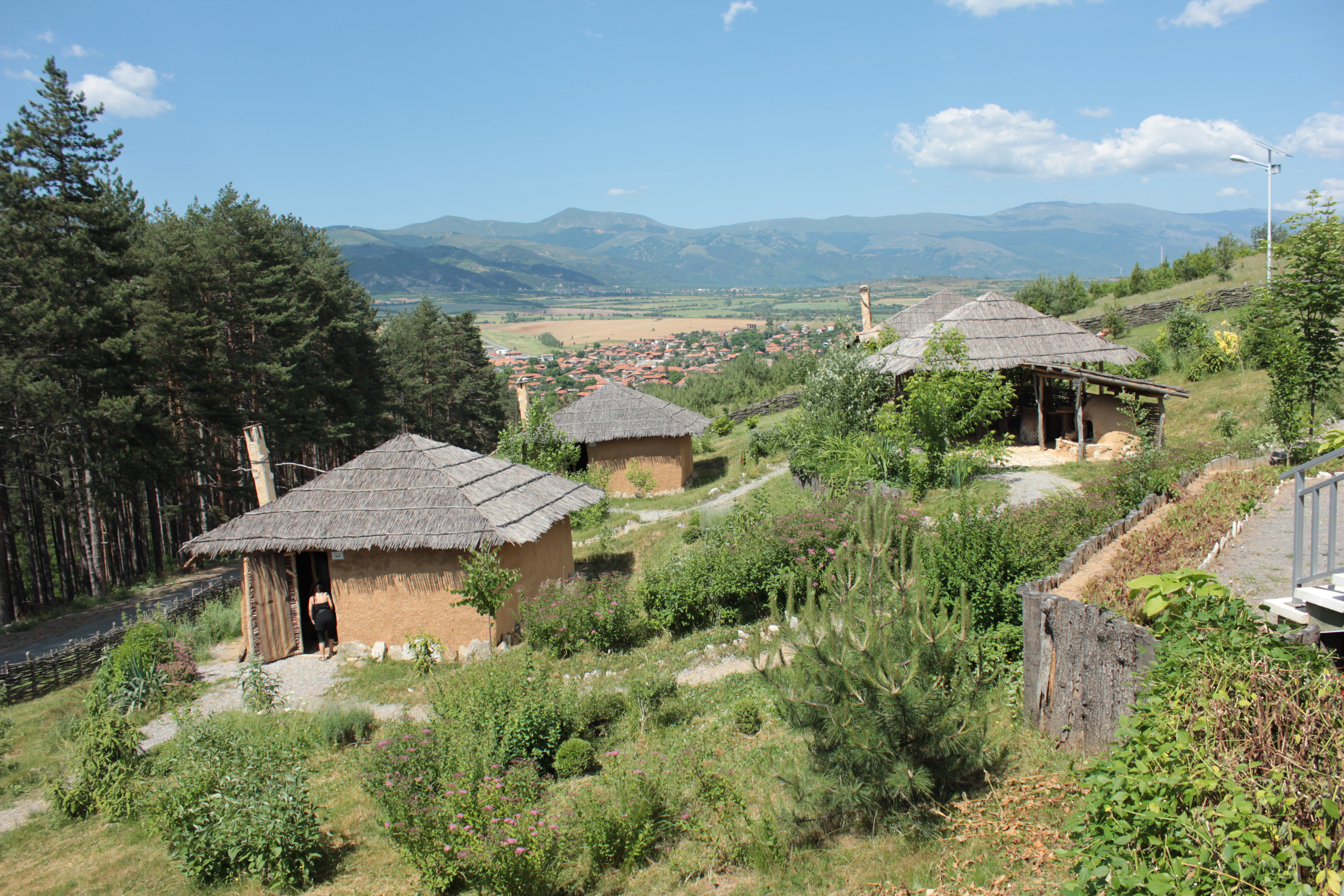
Promachon-Topolnic, Reconstruction of Neolithic houses, Topolnica, Bulgaria

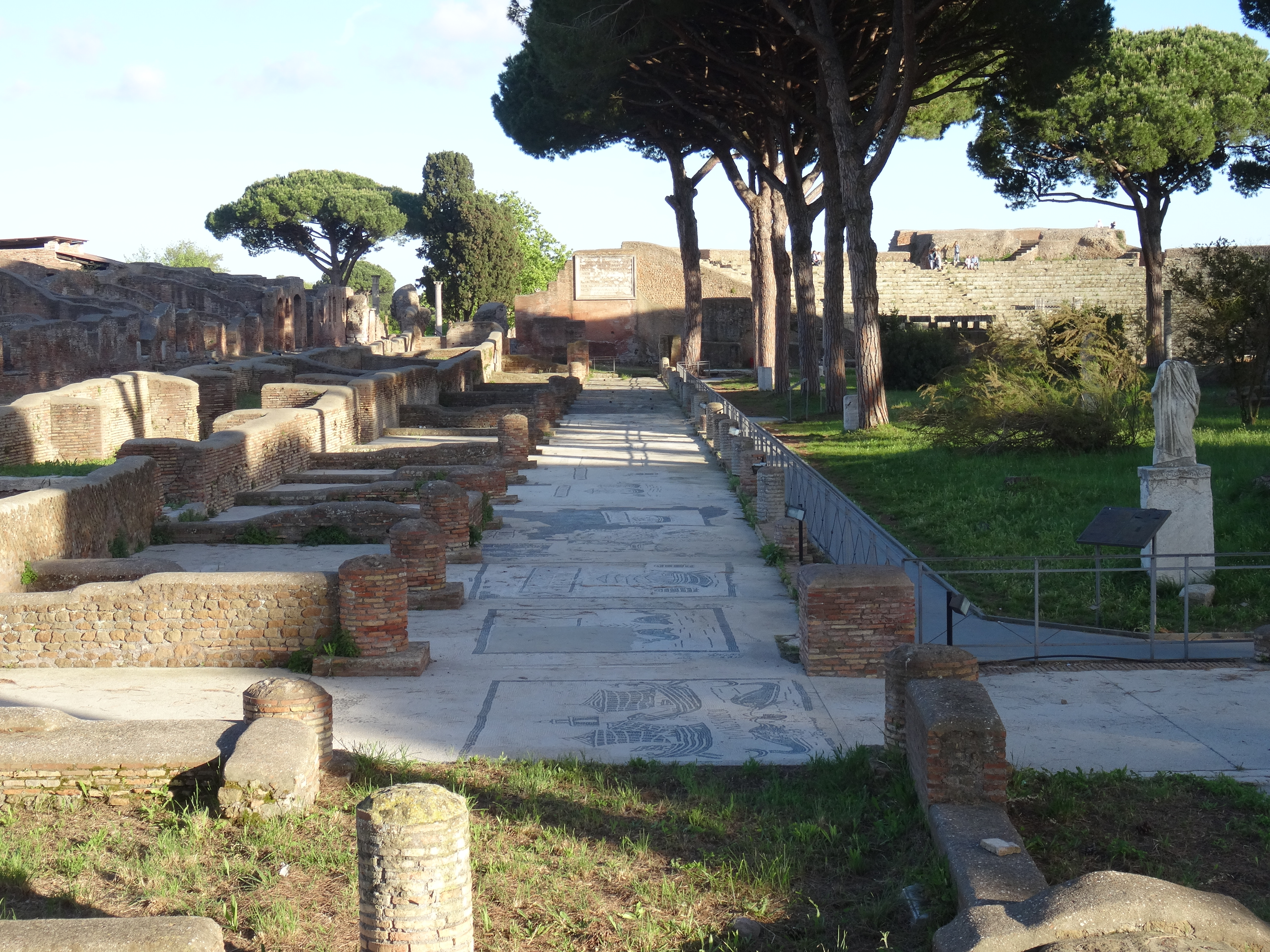
Ostia Antica, near Rome

The above definition was made by EXARC, a global network of professionals for those active in archaeological open-air museums, experimental archaeology, ancient technology and interpretation, using ICOM's definition of museums. By that time Roeland Paardekooper was their director. Further explanation of its components:

- Museum – "A museum is a non-profit, permanent institution in the service of society and its development, open to the public, which acquires, conserves, researches, communicates and exhibits the tangible and intangible heritage of humanity and its environment for the purposes of education, study and enjoyment." Professional practice and performance in archaeological open-air museums should respect the ICOM Code of Ethics for Museums.
- True to scale architectural reconstructions in the open air – Archaeological open-air museums deal with outdoor true-to-scale reconstructed buildings. These can be constructed and interpreted only under the condition that: "the original buildings of the type portrayed are no longer available (and) the copies or reconstructions are made according to the strictest scientific methods". The authenticity of materials and techniques used should be clearly accounted for through written and accessible records, quoting the sources of information on which the reconstructions are based. An honest assessment of each reconstruction should be feasible.
- Collections of intangible heritage resources – The overall presentation of an archaeological open-air museum can be regarded (classified/defined) as a collection of intangible heritage resources which provides an interpretation of how people lived and acted with reference to a specific context of time and place.
- Connected to scientific research – The connection between scientific research and any specific archaeological open-air museum is provided by the active role of a trained archaeologist among the staff or an archaeological counsellor belonging to an affiliated organisation.
- Appropriate interpretation with organisation of activities for visitors – Depending on the nature and number of visitors, different kinds of interpretation can be appropriate. These activities can involve (but are not limited to) guided tours, educational programmes, presentation of experimental archaeology research, demonstrations of ancient crafts and techniques, live interpretation and living history activities.

== Examples ==
Examples of archaeological open-air museums are Flag Fen, Biskupin, Lake Dwelling Museum Unteruhldingen, Saalburg, Colonial Williamsburg, Plimoth Patuxet, Craggaunowen, West Stow Anglo-Saxon village, Butser Ancient Farm, Havránok, the Scottish Crannog Centre and the Eindhoven Museum.
