= Teurisci =

Ancient people of Dacia

The Teurisci (Ancient Greek: Τευρίσκοι) were an ancient people of north-western Dacia, recorded by Ptolemy as neighbours of the Anarti. They are generally taken to be Celtic, though several scholars consider them instead a Celticised Dacian population. Their name is widely linked with that of the Taurisci of the eastern Alps. Whether they formed a distinct people, a branch of the Taurisci, or a local Dacian population that had taken on Celtic culture is disputed, as is the linguistic character of the name itself. Apart from Ptolemy, the name may occur in two Latin inscriptions from Capua and in the restored text of an Augustan inscription from Tusculum.

== Name ==
The people are recorded by Ptolemy, who lists the Teurisci (Τευρίσκοι) among the peoples of Dacia, directly after the Anarti. The name also appears in two Latin inscriptions from Capua in Italy.

The name is generally connected with that of the Taurisci of the eastern Alps. Strabo records that the Taurisci were also called Teurisci, and Ptolemy's Dacian people appear only in the latter form. On this view the two names are the same, with Taurisci the older shape and Teurisci a later variant produced by a change of au to eu. The absence of *eu in Gaulish also is taken to support an original -au-. Zsolt Simon treats that change as a feature of the Celtic spoken in Pannonia, parallel to the variation between Aravisci and Eravisci.

The etymology is disputed. Peter Anreiter derives the name from a stem *taur-, understood as 'dwellers by the Tauern' in the Alps. This connection, resting mainly on linguistic argument, has often been questioned. In another line of interpretation the name is connected with Indo-European *tauros ('bull'), in which case Taurisci would not follow the metathesized Celtic form taruos. The element is also seen in the name of the neighbouring Taurini. By contrast, Alexander Falileyev regards the stem teur- / taur- as probably non-Celtic, which leaves the Celtic character of the name resting on its suffix *-isk-. That suffix has a wide Indo-European range, and it is found in several names long held to be Celtic, including Aravisci, Boisci, Scordisci and Taurisci.

== Ethnic affiliation ==
The ethnic character of the Teurisci is debated, as it is for their neighbours the Anarti. The name has generally been treated as Celtic, and the people frequently associated with the Celtic Taurisci. Historians have long favored a Celtic identity, though Alexander Falileyev holds that the linguistic case is weaker than that label suggests. Gennadii Kazakevich describes the Teurisci and the Anarti as Celtic or hybrid names borne by a Celticized Dacian population, the same that established the hill-forts of Mala Kopania and Zemplín in the upper Tisza. The detailed La Tène record of the upper Tisza, with its rural settlements, ironworking centers and the large open site of Galish-Lovachka, is the wider background to this population. Its attribution to the Teurisci in particular rests on the identification proposed by Marek Olędzki and Gennadii Kazakevich, not on direct evidence.

== Geography ==
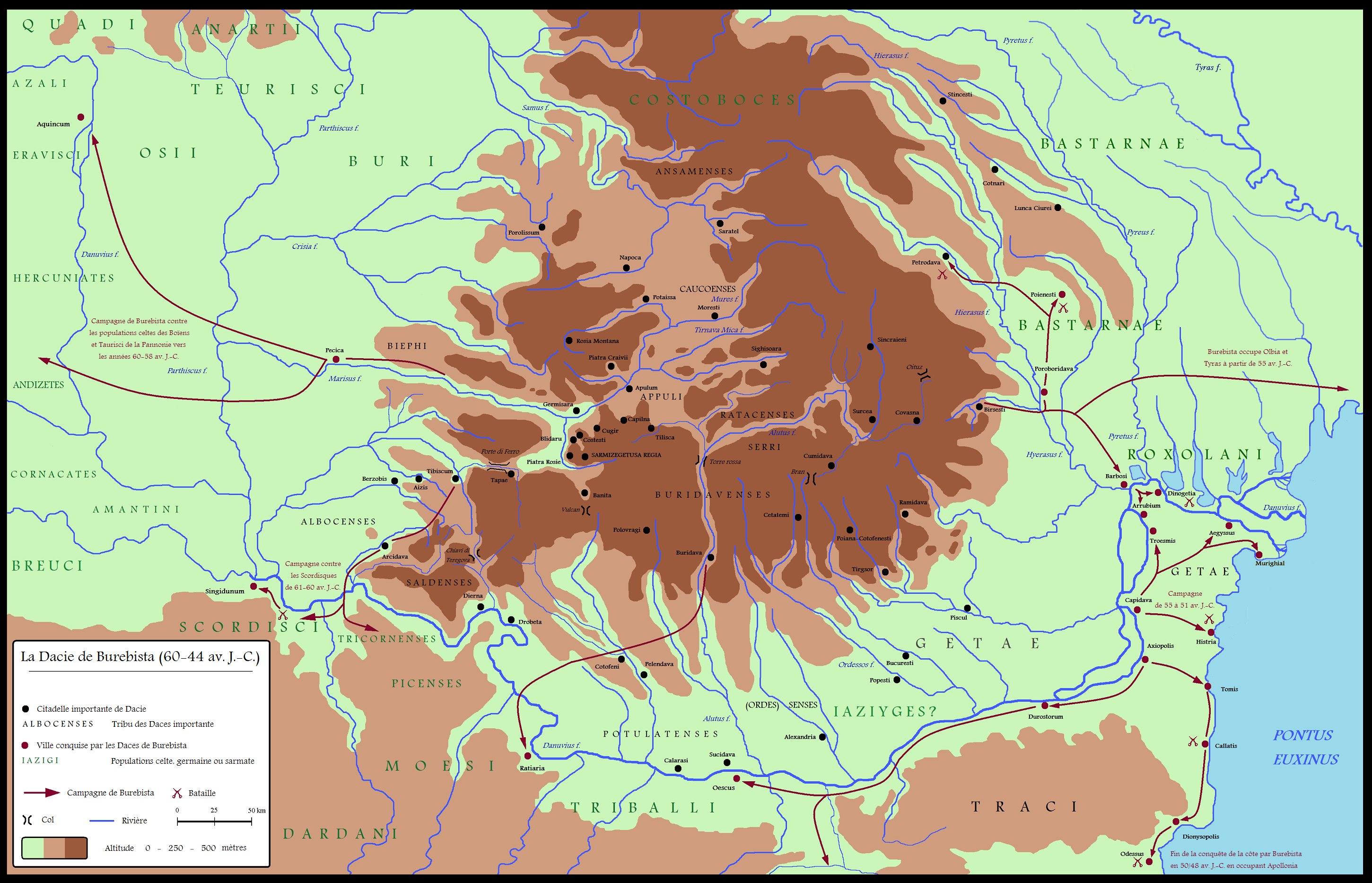
Ancient tribes in Dacia.

In Ptolemy's list of the peoples of Dacia, the Teurisci are the second from the west among the northern tribes, set between the Anarti and the Costoboci. Their precise seats are disputed. On the available evidence the people can be placed only broadly, in the upper Tisza basin and the neighbouring parts of Slovakia.

Ioana Bogdan-Cătăniciu placed them south of the Someș. Marek Olędzki argued instead for the upper Tisza basin, and identified their territory with the zone of the Zemplín archaeological culture in eastern Slovakia. András Mócsy had set the Teurisci and the Anarti further east, in part within north-eastern Transylvania. Zsolt Visy rejects that placement as resting on a probably mistaken reading of Caesar, and locates both peoples in modern Slovakia and the hill country of northern Hungary, where he takes them for the first wave of Celtic settlers in the region.

== History ==
The upper Tisza basin and the north-western edge of Dacia were settled by Celtic groups arriving from central Europe from the early 3rd century BC, who introduced La Tène forms in metalwork, pottery and the layout of settlements. Marek Olędzki linked the Teurisci with this movement. He took them for a branch of the Taurisci who were broken by the Dacian king Burebista and settled in the Tisza region comparatively late, about the middle of the 1st century BC, in the area of the Zemplín culture.

Strabo reports that Burebista crushed the Celtic peoples west of the Carpathians, the Boii and the Taurisci among them, under their leader Critasiros, and the La Tène settlements of the upper Tisza declined around the middle of the 1st century BC. Some sites outlasted these campaigns. Painted pottery from the Dacian centre at Zemplín, found at Bakta and Dyida, shows that part of the Celtic population survived into the second half of the century.

The name may also stand in the elogium of Tusculum, a fragmentary Augustan inscription that records a Roman commander's campaign across the Danube, usually identified with Marcus Vinicius and dated to about 10 or 9 BC. The text names peoples of the Carpathian basin brought under Roman authority. Where the stone is broken, Andreas Alföldi and András Mócsy restored the Teurisci among them, after the Cotini and Osi and before the Anarti. Zsolt Visy treats this restoration as secure, and reads the peoples from west to east, in the direction of the march, while allowing for a further lost name between the Osi and the Teurisci. Péter Kovács is more guarded, and presents the Teurisci only as one likely candidate for the single partly-lost ethnonym. Strabo's notice that the Romans carried their war supplies by boat up the Maros and the Tisza has been connected with the same operations.

The Celtic peoples of the region, the Teurisci among them, had spread east as far as Transylvania before they were absorbed by the Dacians. Gennadii Kazakevich argues that the Dacian advance into the upper Tisza did not destroy the local Celtic culture, and that the inhabitants kept a distinct identity, reflected in the survival of the names Teurisci and Anarti.
