= Osii =

Osii may refer to:

- Asii, an ancient people of Bactria
- Osi (ancient tribe), an ancient people of Central Europe
