= Bastarnae =

Ethnic group, 300 BC - 300 AD, east of the Carpathians

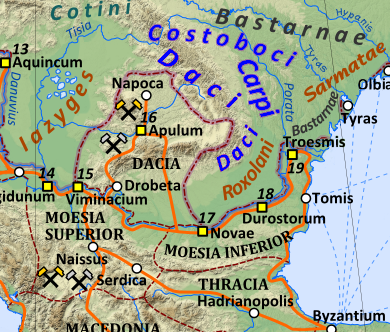
Map showing Roman Dacia and surrounding peoples in 125 AD

The Bastarnae, Bastarni or Basternae, also known as the Peuci or Peucini, were an ancient people who are known from Greek and Roman records to have inhabited areas north and east of the Carpathian Mountains between about 300 BC and about 300 AD, stretching in an arc from the sources of the Vistula in present-day Poland and Slovakia, to the Lower Danube, and including all or most of present-day Moldava. The Peucini were sometimes described as a subtribe, who settled the Peuke Island in the Danube Delta, but apparently due to their importance their name was sometimes used for the Bastarnae as a whole. Near the sources of the Vistula another part of the Bastarnae were the Sidones, while the Atmoni, another tribe of the Bastarnae are only mentioned in one listing by Strabo.

The earliest Graeco-Roman historians to refer to the Bastarnae imply that they were culturally Celtic. Also consistent with connections to the cultures to their west, later Roman-era sources state directly that they spoke Germanic languages, and could be considered Germanic peoples. In contrast, like other peoples who lived in this geographical region, Graeco-Roman writers also sometimes referred to the Bastarnae as a "Scythian" or "Sarmatian" people, but this was a reference to their location, and customs, rather than a linguistic category. Although largely sedentary, at least one Roman writer, Tacitus, stated that the Bastarnae had adopted some Sarmatian customs. So far, no archaeological sites have been conclusively attributed to the Bastarnae. The archaeological horizon most often associated by scholars with the Bastarnae is the Poieneşti-Lucașeuca culture.

From the first records which mention them, the Bastarnae were active in the region of the Danube estuary on the Black Sea coast. The Bastarnae first came into conflict with the Romans during the first century BC when, in alliance with Dacians and Sarmatians, they unsuccessfully resisted Roman expansion into Moesia and Pannonia, south of the Danube. Later, they appear to have maintained friendly relations with the Roman Empire during the first two centuries AD. This changed around 180 AD, when the Bastarnae are recorded as participants in an invasion of Roman territory, once again in alliance with Sarmatians and Dacians. In the mid-3rd century AD, the Bastarnae were part of a Gothic-led grand coalition of lower Danube tribes that repeatedly invaded the Balkan provinces of the Roman Empire.

Many Bastarnae were resettled within the Roman Empire in the late third century.

== Etymology ==
The origin of the tribal name is uncertain. It is not even clear whether it was an exonym (a name ascribed to them by outsiders) or an endonym (a name by which the Bastarnae described themselves). A related question is whether the groups denoted "Bastarnae" by the Romans considered themselves a distinct ethnic group at all (endonym) or whether it was a generic exonym used by the Greco-Romans to denote a disparate group of tribes of the Carpathian region that could not be classified as Dacians or Sarmatians.

One possible derivation is from the proto-Germanic word *bastjan (from the proto-Indo-European root *bʰas-), meaning "binding" or "tie". In this case, Bastarnae may have had the original meaning of a coalition or bund of tribes.

It is possible that the Roman term basterna, denoting a type of wagon or litter, is derived from the name of this people (or, if it is an exonym, that the name of the people is derived from it) who were known, like many Germanic tribes, to travel with a wagon train for their families.

It has also been suggested that the name is linked with the Germanic word bastard, meaning illegitimate or mongrel, and this name is sometimes contrasted to proposed Germanic etymologies for the name of the Sciri who lived in the same general region. However, Roger Batty considers this Germanic derivation unlikely. If the name is an endonym, then this derivation is unlikely, as most endonyms have flattering meanings (e.g. "brave", "strong", "noble").

Trubačev proposes a derivation from Old Persian, Avestan bast- "bound, tied; slave" (cf. Ossetic bættən "bind", bast "bound") and Iranian *arna- "offspring", equating it with the δουλόσποροι "slave Sporoi" mentioned by Nonnus and Cosmas, where the Sporoi are the people Procopius mentions as the ancestors of the Slavs.

== Location ==
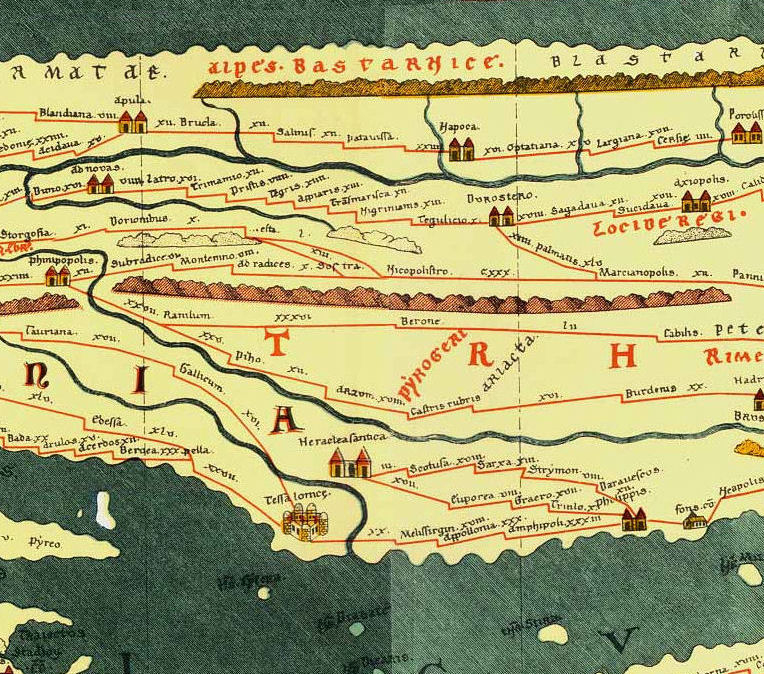
Location of Blastarni and the Alpes Bastarnicae north of Roman Dacia, as depicted on Tabula Peutingeriana

The earliest classical mentions of the Bastarnae locate them north of the Lower Danube, although they apparently made frequent crossings impacting upon the peoples living south of the Danube.

Strabo (about 20 AD) made several remarks about the location of the Bastarnae. In one place he described the lands beyond the Rhine and Danube as the home of the Galatian (Celtic) and the Germanic peoples, and beyond these (to the east) were the Bastarnae and their neighbours the Tyregetans "and the River Borysthenes" (Dnieper). However, in another similar passage he says only that "most writers suspect" the Bastarnae to be next beyond the Germanic Peoples, but he indicates that it is also possible that "others lie in between, either the Iazyges, or the Roxolani, or certain other of the wagon-dwellers — it is not easy to say". In yet another similar passage he describes the Bastarnae as the most inland (northerly) of the peoples living between the Borysthenes (Dnieper) and the Ister (Lower Danube), and indicates that their neighbours the Tyregetans are closer to the Black Sea.

Strabo also mentioned their interactions with other peoples near the Danube, specifying that in his time, "wagon-dwelling" Scythians and Sarmatians, "as well as the Bastarnian tribes, are mingled with the Thracians (more indeed with those outside the Ister [North of the Danube], but also with those inside). And mingled with them are also the Celtic tribes — the Boii, the Scordisci, and the Taurisci". He confirmed that historically "the Scythians and Bastarnians and Sauromatians on the far side of the river [the Lower Danube] often prevail to the extent that they actually cross over to attack those whom they have already driven out, and some of them remain there, either in the islands or in Thrace". In particular, Near the outlets of the Ister River [Lower Danube] is a great island called Peuce; and when the Bastarnians took possession of it they received the appellation of Peucini."

In one passage Pliny the Elder located the Bastarnae "and other Germanic peoples" in the lands beyond the Iazyges and Dacians (aversa Basternae tenent aliique inde Germani). In another he describes "the Peucini, the Basternae", as neighbours of the Dacians.

In the second century AD, the texts attached to Ptolemy's Geography say that "above Dacia are the Peucini and the Basternae"; "between the Peucini and the Basternae are the Carpiani"; "between the Basternae and the Rhoxolani" who he places on the Black Sea coast, "are the Chuni" (otherwise unknown); and "below the Basternae near Dacia are the Tigri and below these are the Tyrangitae" whose names are linked to the Tyras or Dniester river. Possibly relevant, he also mentioned a mountainous region called the "Peuca" mountains south of the Costoboci and Transmontani. The Sidones, named as one part of the Bastarnae by Strabo, are described by Ptolemy as one of the peoples east of the Vistula, although the location is not clear. It thus appears that the Bastarnae were settled near the northern and eastern flanks of the Carpathians in what is now western Ukraine to the Danube Delta.

The Peutinger Map (produced ca. 400 AD, but including material from as early as the first century) shows the Bastarnae (mis-spelt Blastarni) beyond the Carpathian mountains and appears to name the Galician Carpathians as the Alpes Bastarnicae.

Because of their apparent cultural and linguistic connections to the west, the Bastarnae are generally believed to have moved originally from that direction, but this remains uncertain. Babeş and Shchukin argue in favour of an origin in eastern Pomerania on the Baltic coast of today's north-west Poland, on the grounds of correspondences in archaeological material, e.g. a Pomeranian-style fibula found in a Poieneşti site in Moldavia, although Batty considers the evidence insufficient. Babeş identifies the Sidoni, a branch of the Bastarnae which Strabo mentioned with the Sidini located by Ptolemy in Pomerania.

Batty argues that Greco-Roman sources of the first century AD locate the Bastarnae homeland on the northern side of the Northern Carpathian mountain range, encompassing south-east Poland and south-west Ukraine (i.e. the region traditionally known as Galicia).

== Ethno-linguistic affiliation ==
Scholars hold divergent theories about the ethnicity of the Bastarnae. One view, implied by some of the earliest reports, is that they spoke a Celtic language. The only explicit description of their language, was a much later remark by Tacitus, who said they spoke a language like the Germanic peoples. However others hold that they were Scythian/Germanic, or mixed Germanic/Sarmatian. A fringe theory is that they were Proto-Slavic. Shchukin argues that the ethnicity of the Bastarnae was unique and rather than trying to label them as Celtic, Germanic or Sarmatian, it should be accepted that the "Basternae were the Basternae". Batty argues that assigning an "ethnicity" to the Bastarnae is meaningless; as in the context of the Iron Age Pontic-Danubian region, with its multiple overlapping peoples and languages, ethnicity was a very fluid concept, which changed rapidly and frequently, according to socio-political vicissitudes. That was especially true of the Bastarnae, who are attested over a relatively-vast area. The Bastarnae maintained a separate name until ca. 300 AD, probably implying retention of their distinctive ethno-linguistic heritage up to that time.

=== Celtic ===
Polybius (200–118 BC) writing about the time of Perseus of Macedon (d. 166 BCE) explained how the Dardanians sought help from the Romans against the Bastarnae, who were allied with the Macedonian and Celtic (Galatian) enemies of Rome, which can be taken as implying that they were not Galatian. He described them as numerous, physically large, and valorous warriors.

On the other hand, a much later report of these events by Livy (64 BC – 17 AD), writing about 10 AD, is sometimes understood to imply that the Bastarnae spoke a Celtic language (or a related language) because when comparing them to the Scordisci, a major Galatian tribe of Pannonia, it says about the Bastarnae that "neither in speech nor habits were they dissimilar". The Scordisci are described as Celtic by Strabo, although he adds that they had mingled with Illyrians and Thracians).

Much later still, the Greek historian Plutarch (about 46-120 AD), also talking the time of Perseus of Macedon, went further, writing that the Roman consul Hostilius "secretly stirred up the Gauls settled along the Danube, who are called Basternae".

Another reason to consider the Bastarnae as Celtic is that the regions they are documented to have occupied (the northern and eastern slopes of the Carpathians) overlapped to a great extent with the locations of Celtic tribes attested in the northern Carpathians. (The modern name of this region, Galicia, is generally regarded as having a later origin, in either a Slavic or Turkic language. However, some scholars have instead suggested that the name Galicia may derive from its former Celtic inhabitants the Taurisci, Osi, Cotini and Anartes of Slovakia and northern Romania and the Britogalli of the Danube Delta region.) In addition, archaeological cultures which some scholars have linked to the Bastarnae (Poieneşti-Lukashevka and Zarubintsy) display pronounced Celtic affinities. Finally, the arrival of the Bastarnae in the Pontic-Danubian region, which can be dated to 233–216 BC according to two ancient sources, coincides with the latter phase of Celtic migration into the region (400–200 BC).

In addition, inscription AE (1905) 14, recording a campaign on the Hungarian Plain by the Augustan-era general Marcus Vinucius (10 BC or 8 BC), also appears to distinguish the Bastarnae from neighbouring Celtic tribes: "Marcus Vinucius... governor of Illyricum, the first [Roman general] to advance across the river Danube, defeated in battle and routed an army of Dacians and Basternae, and subjugated the Cotini, Osi,...[missing tribal name] and Anartii to the power of the emperor Augustus and of the people of Rome."

Of the names of the Bastarnae leaders, Cotto, Clondicus and Teutagonus. Cotto may be Celtic.

=== Germanic ===
Three Greco-Roman geographers of the first century AD associated the Bastarnae and Peucini with the Germanic peoples, and one source, Tacitus, specifies that they spoke a language like the Germanic peoples. The Greek geographer Strabo (64 BC – 24 AD) writing c. 5–20 AD, made several remarks about the location of the Bastarnae in his own time. In one passage he says that their country borders upon the Tyregetans, who lived near the Black Sea between the Danube and Dnieper, and Germanic peoples to the west, and that they "one might say", were of "Germanic stock". On the other hand he also describes the Roxolani, normally considered Sarmatians, to be the most northerly part of the Bastarnae, roaming the plains between Dnieper and Don.

The Roman geographer Pliny the Elder (c. 77 AD), classified the Bastarnae or Peucini as being one of the five main subdivisions of Germanic peoples, the other subdivisions as the three West Germanic groups, the Inguaeones, Istuaeones and Hermiones, and the East Germanic Vandili.

Notably, the Roman historian Tacitus (56–120 AD), writing about 100 AD, described the Bastarnae as probably being a Germanic people, but with substantial Sarmatian cultural influence and intermarriage:

As to the tribes of the Peucini, Veneti, and Fenni I am in doubt whether I should class them with the Germans or the Sarmatæ, although indeed the Peucini called by some Bastarnæ, are like Germans in their language, mode of life, and in the permanence of their settlements. They all live in filth and sloth, and by the intermarriages of the chiefs they are becoming in some degree debased into a resemblance to the Sarmatæ.

=== Scytho-Sarmatian ===
Strabo includes the Roxolani, generally considered by scholars and other classical sources to have been a Sarmatian tribe, in a list of Bastarnae subgroups, along with the Atmoni, Sidoni and Peucini, saying that they were the most northerly of them, roaming the plains between the Dnieper and Don.

In the third century, the Greek historian Dio Cassius (155–235 AD) stated that the "Bastarnae are properly classed as Scythians" and "members of the Scythian race".

"During the same period in which these events occurred Marcus Crassus was sent into Macedonia and Greece and carried on war with the Dacians and Bastarnae. I have already stated who the former were and why they had become hostile; the Bastarnae, on the other hand, who are properly classed as Scythians, had at this time crossed the Ister and subdued the part of Moesia opposite them, and afterwards subdued the Triballi who adjoin this district and the Dardani who inhabit the Triballian country."

Likewise, the sixth-century historian Zosismus (490s–510 AD), reporting events around 280 AD, refers to "the Bastarnae, a Scythian people".

However, late Greco-Roman chroniclers used the term "Scythian" without regard to language. The earliest Scythians were steppe nomads associated with Iranic languages, as were their successors the Sarmatians, who were also called Scythians, while classical authors such as Zosimus also routinely refers to the Goths, who were undoubtedly Germanic-speakers, as "Scythians". On the other hand, it is likely that Bastarnae were influenced the surrounding Sarmatians, as reflected in Tacitus' comment that "mixed marriages" debasing them to appear more like the Sarmatians.

== Material culture ==
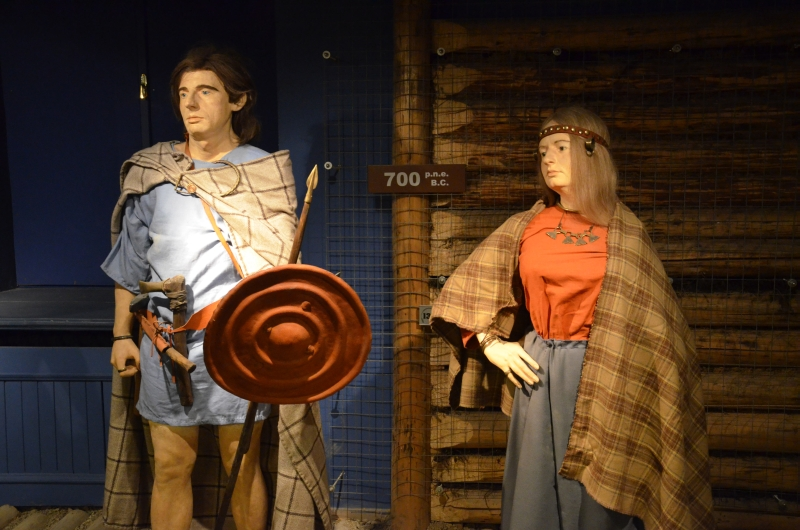
Attempt to reconstruct Bastarnae costumes at the Archaeological Museum of Kraków. Such clothing and weapons were commonplace among peoples on the Roman Empire's borders.

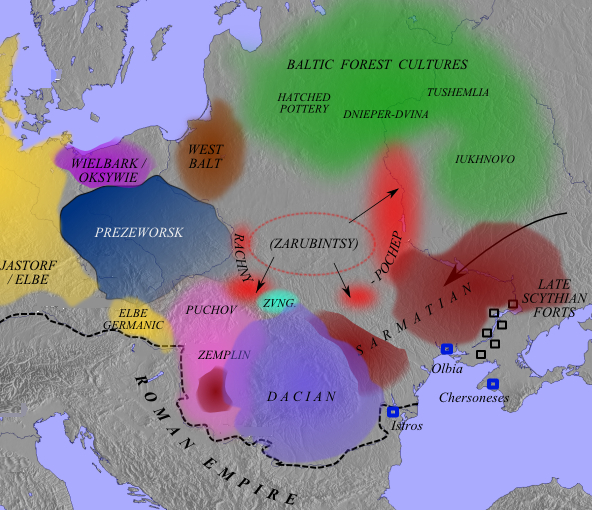
Archaeological cultures in the early Roman period, c. 100 AD

According to Malcolm Todd, traditional archaeology has not been able to construct a typology of Bastarnae material culture, and thus to ascribe particular archaeological sites to the Bastarnae. A complicating factor is that the regions where Bastarnae are attested contained a patchwork of peoples and cultures (Sarmatians, Scythians, Dacians, Thracians, Celts, Germans and others), some sedentary, some nomadic. In any event, post-1960s archaeological theory has questioned the validity of equating material "cultures", as defined by archaeologists, with distinct ethnic groups. In this view, it is impossible to attribute a "culture" to a particular ethnic group: it is likely that the material cultures discerned in the region belonged to several, if not all, of the groups inhabiting it. These cultures probably represent relatively large-scale socio-economic interactions between disparate communities of the broad region, possibly including mutually antagonistic groups.

It is not even certain whether the Bastarnae were sedentary, nomadic or semi-nomadic. Tacitus' statement that they were "German in their way of life and types of dwelling" implies a sedentary bias, but their close relations with the Sarmatians, who were nomadic, may indicate a more nomadic lifestyle for some Bastarnae, as does their attested wide geographical range. If the Bastarnae were nomadic, then the sedentary "cultures" identified by archaeologists in their lebensraum would not represent them. Nomadic peoples generally leave scant traces, due to the impermanent materials and foundations used in the construction of their dwellings.

Scholars have identified two closely related sedentary "cultures" as possible candidates to represent the Bastarnae (among other peoples) as their locations broadly correspond to where ancient sources placed the Basternae: the Zarubintsy culture lying in the forest-steppe zone in northern Ukraine and southern Belarus, and the Poieneşti-Lukashevka culture (Lucăşeuca) in northern Moldavia. These cultures were characterised by agriculture, documented by numerous finds of sickles. Dwellings were either of surface or semi-subterranean types, with posts supporting the walls, a hearth in the middle and large conical pits located nearby. Some sites were defended by ditches and banks, structures thought to have been built to defend against nomadic tribes from the steppe. Inhabitants practiced cremation. Cremated remains were either placed in large, hand-made ceramic urns, or were placed in a large pit and surrounded by food and ornaments such as spiral bracelets and Middle to Late La Tène-type fibulae (attesting the continuing strength of Celtic influence in this region).

A major problem with associating the Poieneşti-Lukashevka and Zarubintsy cultures with the Bastarnae is that both cultures had disappeared by the early first century AD, while the Bastarnae continue to be attested in those regions throughout the Roman Principate. Another issue is that the Poieneşti-Lukashevka culture has also been attributed to the Costoboci, a people considered ethnically Dacian by mainstream scholarship, who inhabited northern Moldavia, according to Ptolemy (ca. 140 AD). Indeed, Mircea Babeş and Silvia Theodor, the two Romanian archaeologists who identified Lukashevka as Bastarnic, nevertheless insisted that the majority of the population in the Lukashevka sphere (in northern Moldavia) was "Geto-Dacian". A further problem is that neither of these cultures were present in the Danube Delta region, where a major concentration of Bastarnae are attested by the ancient sources.

Starting in about 200 AD, the Chernyakhov culture became established in the modern-day western Ukraine and Moldova region inhabited by the Bastarnae. The culture is characterised by a high degree of sophistication in the production of metal and ceramic artefacts, as well as of uniformity over a vast area. Although this culture has conventionally been identified with the migration of the Gothic ethnos into the region from the northwest, Todd argues that its most important origin is Scytho-Sarmatian. Although the Goths certainly contributed to it, so probably did other peoples of the region such as the Dacians, proto-Slavs, Carpi and possibly the Bastarnae.

== Relations with Rome ==
=== Roman Republican era (to 30 BC) ===
==== Allies of Philip of Macedon (179–8 BC) ====
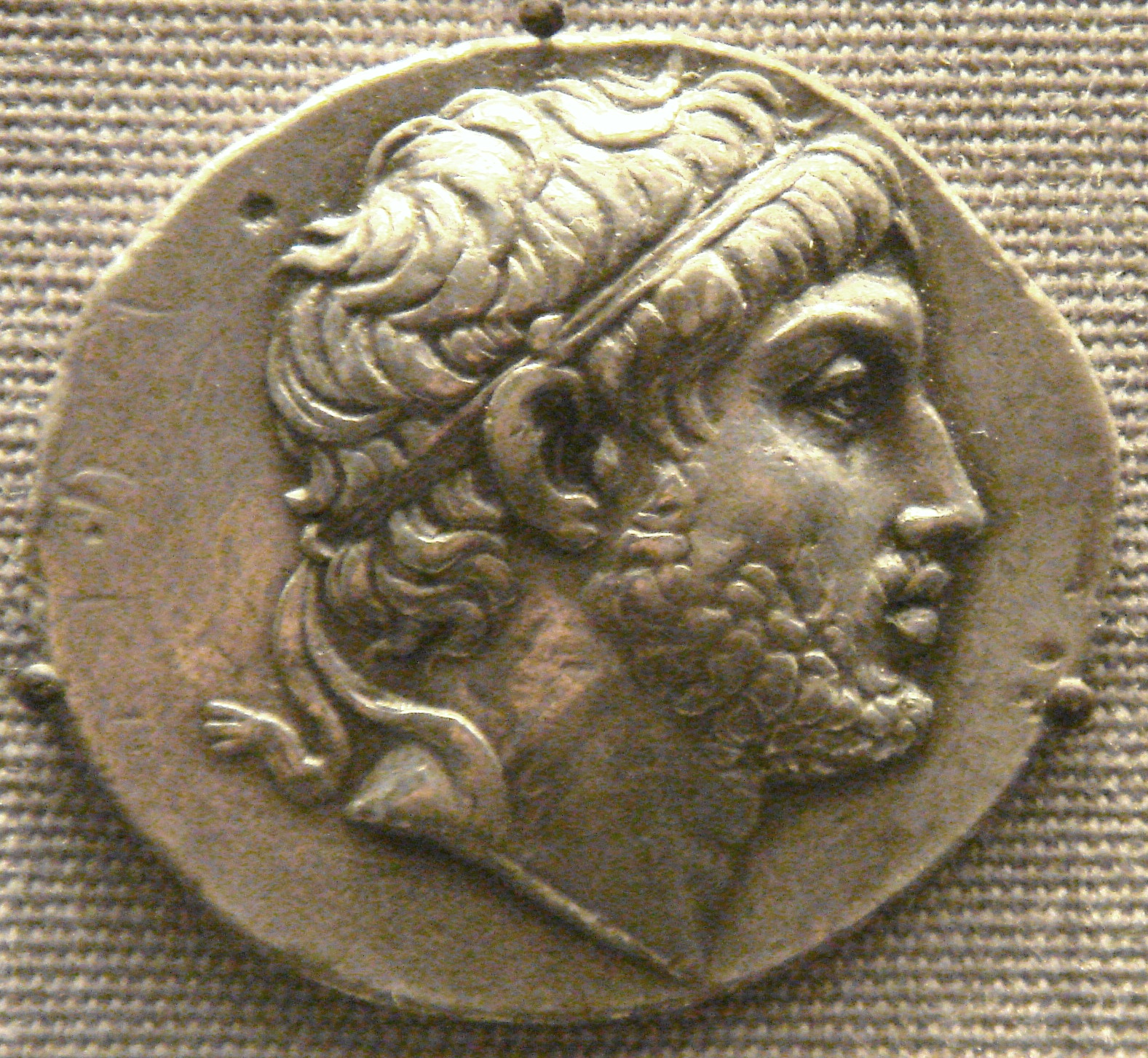
Silver tetradrachm of Philip V of Macedon

The Bastarnae first appear in the historical record in 179 BC, when they crossed the Danube in a massive force. They did so at the invitation of their long-time ally, King Philip V of Macedon, a direct descendant of Antigonus, one of the Diadochi, the generals of Alexander the Great who had shared his empire after his death in 323 BC. The Macedonian king had suffered a disastrous defeat at the hands of the Romans in the Second Macedonian War (200–197 BC), which had reduced him from a powerful Hellenistic monarch to the status of a petty client-king with a much-reduced territory and a tiny army. (Note: The terms imposed on Philip V of Macedon in 196 BC were: (i) loss of all possessions outside Macedonia proper (Philip had previously ruled extensive territories in Greece, Thrace and Asia Minor); (ii) standing army limited to 5,000 men and no elephants; (iii) navy limited to 5 warships plus royal galley; (iv) reparation payment of 1,000 talents (c. 26 tonnes) of silver, equivalent then to c. 4 tonnes of gold. (In antiquity, silver was far more valuable than today: the gold/silver value ratio was c. 1:7, compared to c. 1:100 today); (v) prohibited from waging war outside his borders without the Roman Senate's permission) After nearly 20 years of slavish adherence to the Roman Senate's dictats, Philip had been goaded by the incessant and devastating raiding of the Dardani, a warlike Illyrian tribe on his northern border, which his treaty-limited army was too small to counter effectively. Counting on the Bastarnae, with whom he had forged friendly relations, he plotted a strategy to deal with the Dardani and then to regain his lost territories in Greece and his political independence. First, he would unleash the Bastarnae against the Dardani. After the latter had been crushed, Philip planned to settle Bastarnae families in Dardania (southern Kosovo/Skopje region) to ensure that the region was permanently subdued. In a second phase, Philip aimed to launch the Bastarnae on an invasion of Italy via the Adriatic coast. Although he was aware that the Bastarnae were likely to be defeated, Philip hoped that the Romans would be distracted long enough to allow him to reoccupy his former possessions in Greece.

However, Philip, now 60 years of age, died before the Bastarnae could arrive. The Bastarnae host was still en route through Thrace, where it became embroiled in hostilities with the locals, who had not provided them with sufficient food at affordable prices as they marched through. Probably in the vicinity of Philippopolis (modern Plovdiv, Bulgaria), the Bastarnae broke out of their marching columns and pillaged the land far and wide. The terrified local Thracians took refuge with their families and animal herds on the slopes of Mons Donuca (Mount Musala), the highest mountain in Thrace. A large force of Bastarnae chased them up the mountain, but were driven back and scattered by a massive hailstorm. Then the Thracians ambushed them, turning their descent into a panic-stricken rout. Back at their wagon fort in the plain, around half of the demoralised Bastarnae decided to return home, leaving c. 30,000 to press on to Macedonia.

Philip's son and successor Perseus, while protesting his loyalty to Rome, deployed his Bastarnae guests in winter quarters in a valley in Dardania, presumably as a prelude to a campaign against the Dardani the following summer. However, in the depths of winter their camp was attacked by the Dardani. The Bastarnae easily beat off the attackers, chased them back to their chief town and besieged them, but they were surprised in the rear by a second force of Dardani, which had approached their camp stealthily by mountain paths, and proceeded to storm and ransack it. Having lost their entire baggage and supplies, the Bastarnae were obliged to withdraw from Dardania and to return home. Most perished as they crossed the frozen Danube on foot, only for the ice to give way. Despite the failure of Philip's Bastarnae strategy, the suspicion aroused by these events in the Roman Senate, which had been warned by the Dardani of the Bastarnae invasion, ensured the demise of Macedonia as an independent state. Rome declared war on Perseus in 171 BC and after the Macedonian army was crushed at the Battle of Pydna (168 BC), Macedonia was split up into four Roman puppet-cantons (167 BC). Twenty-one years later, these were in turn abolished and annexed to the Roman Republic as the province of Macedonia (146 BC).

==== Allies of Getan high king Burebista (62 BC) ====
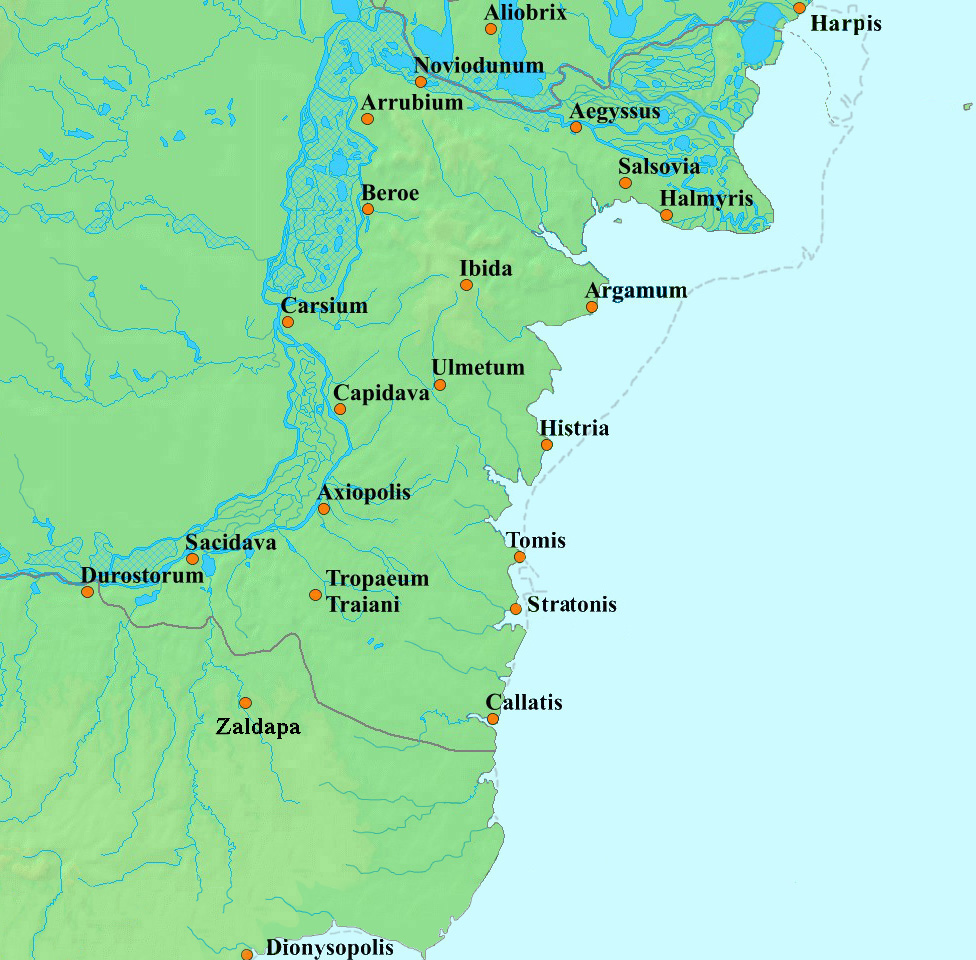
Map of Scythia Minor (Dobruja), showing the Greek coastal cities of Histria, Tomis, Callatis and Dionysopolis (Istria, Constanța, Mangalia and Balchik)

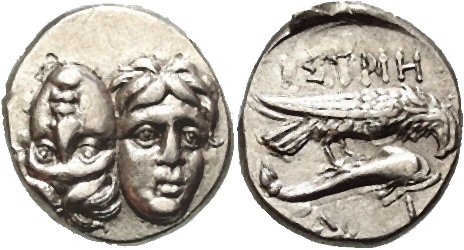
Coin issued by the Greek coastal city of Histria (Sinoe)

The Bastarnae first came into direct conflict with Rome as a result of expansion into the lower Danube region by the proconsuls (governors) of Macedonia in 75–72 BC. Gaius Scribonius Curio (proconsul 75–73 BC) campaigned successfully against the Dardani and the Moesi, becoming the first Roman general to reach the Danube with his army. His successor, Marcus Licinius Lucullus (brother of the famous Lucius Lucullus), campaigned against the Thracian Bessi tribe and the Moesi, ravaging the whole of Moesia, the region between the Haemus (Balkan) mountain range and the Danube. In 72 BC, his troops occupied the Greek coastal cities of Scythia Minor (modern Dobruja region, Romania/Bulgaria), (Note: The main ones were: Histria (Sinoe), Tomis, Callatis, Apollonia (Istria, Constanţa, Mangalia, Sozopol)) which had sided with Rome's Hellenistic arch-enemy, King Mithridates VI of Pontus, in the Third Mithridatic War (73–63 BC).

The presence of Roman forces in the Danube Delta was seen as a major threat by all the neighbouring transdanubian peoples: the Peucini Bastarnae, the Sarmatians and, most importantly, by Burebista (ruled 82–44 BC), king of the Getae. The Getae occupied the region today called Wallachia as well as Scythia Minor and were either a Dacian- or Thracian- speaking people. (Note: There is controversy about whether the Getae were Dacian or Thracian speakers and whether those two languages were similar. Strabo claims that the Getae were Thracians. He adds that the Dacians spoke the same language as the Getae. This gave rise to the hypothesis that Thracian and Dacian were essentially the same language (the Daco-Thracian theory). But the modern linguist Vladimir Georgiev disputes that Dacian and Thracian were closely related for various reasons, especially that Dacian and Moesian town names commonly end with the suffix -DAVA, while towns in Thrace proper generally end in -PARA. According to Georgiev, the language spoken by the Getae should be classified as "Daco-Moesian" and regarded as quite distinct from Thracian. Support for the Daco-Moesian theory can be found in Dio, who confirms that the Moesians and Getae on the south bank of the Danube were Dacians. But the scant evidence available for these two extinct languages does not permit any firm conclusions. For the dividing-line between the two placename forms, see the following map (lower map, scroll down): members.tripod.com) Burebista had unified the Getae tribes into a single kingdom, for which the Greek cities were vital trade outlets. In addition, he had established his hegemony over neighbouring Sarmatian and Bastarnae tribes. At its peak, the Getae kingdom reportedly was able to muster 200,000 warriors. Burebista led his transdanubian coalition in a struggle against Roman encroachment, conducting many raids against Roman allies in Moesia and Thrace, penetrating as far as Macedonia and Illyria.

The coalition's main chance came in 62 BC, when the Greek cities rebelled against Roman rule. In 61 BC, the notoriously oppressive and militarily incompetent proconsul of Macedonia, Gaius Antonius, nicknamed Hybrida ("The Monster"), an uncle of the famous Mark Antony, led an army against the Greek cities. As his army approached Histria, Antonius detached his entire mounted force from the marching column and led it away on a lengthy excursion, leaving his infantry without cavalry cover, a tactic he had already used with disastrous results against the Dardani. Dio implies that he did so out of cowardice, in order to avoid the imminent clash with the opposition, but it is more likely that he was pursuing a large enemy cavalry force, probably Sarmatians. A Bastarnae host, which had crossed the Danube to assist the Histrians, promptly attacked, surrounded and massacred the Roman infantry, capturing several of their vexilla (military standards). This battle resulted in the collapse of the Roman position on the lower Danube. Burebista apparently annexed the Greek cities (55–48 BC). At the same time, the subjugated "allied" tribes of Moesia and Thrace evidently repudiated their treaties with Rome, as they had to be reconquered by Augustus in 29–8 BC (see below).

In 44 BC, Roman dictator-for-life Julius Caesar planned to lead a major campaign to crush Burebista and his allies once and for all, but he was assassinated before it could start. However, the campaign was made redundant by Burebista's overthrow and death in the same year, after which his Getae empire fragmented into four, later five, independent petty kingdoms. These were militarily far weaker, as Strabo assessed their combined military potential at just 40,000 armed men, and were often involved in internecine warfare. The Geto-Dacians did not again become a threat to Roman hegemony in the lower Danube until the rise of Decebal 130 years later (86 AD).

=== Roman Principate (30 BC – 284 AD) ===
==== Augustan era (30 BC – 14 AD) ====
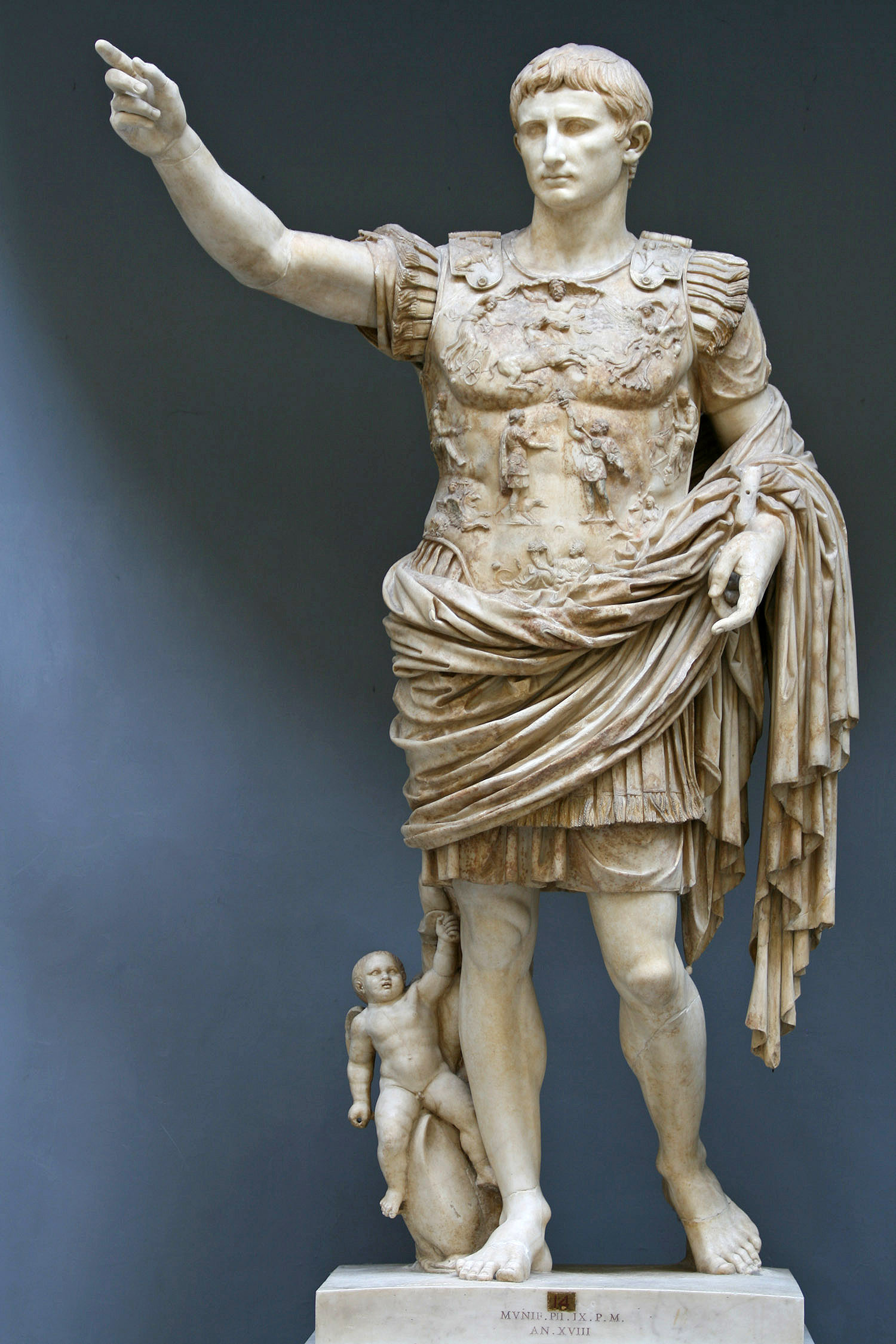
Statue of Augustus in the garb of Roman imperator (military supreme commander). By the end of his sole rule (14 AD), Augustus had expanded the empire to the Danube, which was to remain its central/eastern European border for its entire history (except for the occupation of Dacia 105–275).

Once he had established himself as sole ruler of the Roman state in 30 BC, Caesar's grand-nephew and adopted son Augustus inaugurated a strategy of advancing the empire's south-eastern European border to the line of the Danube from the Alps, the Dinaric Alps and Macedonia. The primary objective was to increase strategic depth between the border and Italy and also to provide a major fluvial supply route between the Roman armies in the region.

On the lower Danube, which was given priority over the upper Danube, this required the annexation of Moesia. The Romans' target was thus the tribes which inhabited Moesia, namely (from west to east) the Triballi, Moesi and those Getae who dwelt south of the Danube. The Bastarnae were also a target because they had recently subjugated the Triballi, whose territory lay on the southern bank of the Danube between the tributary rivers Utus (Vit) and Ciabrus (Tsibritsa), with their chief town at Oescus (Gigen, Bulgaria). In addition, Augustus wanted to avenge the defeat of Gaius Antonius at Histria 32 years before and to recover the lost military standards. These were held in a powerful fortress called Genucla (Isaccea, near modern Tulcea, Romania, in the Danube Delta region), controlled by Zyraxes, the local Getan king. The man selected for the task was Marcus Licinius Crassus, grandson of Crassus the triumvir and an experienced general at 33 years of age, who was appointed proconsul of Macedonia in 29 BC.

The Bastarnae provided the casus belli by crossing the Haemus and attacking the Dentheletae, a Thracian tribe who were Roman allies. Crassus marched to the Dentheletae's assistance, but the Bastarnae host hastily withdrew over the Haemus at his approach. Crassus followed them closely into Moesia but they would not be drawn into battle, withdrawing beyond the Tsibritsa. Crassus now turned his attention to the Moesi, his prime target. After a successful campaign which resulted in the submission of a substantial section of the Moesi, Crassus again sought out the Bastarnae. Discovering their location from some peace envoys they had sent to him, he lured them into battle near the Tsibritsa by a stratagem. Hiding his main body of troops in a wood, he stationed as bait a smaller vanguard in open ground before the wood. As expected, the Bastarnae attacked the vanguard in force, only to find themselves entangled in the full-scale pitched battle with the Romans that they had tried to avoid. The Bastarnae tried to retreat into the forest but were hampered by the wagon train carrying their women and children, as these could not move through the trees. Trapped into fighting to save their families, the Bastarnae were routed. Crassus personally killed their king, Deldo, in combat, a feat which qualified him for Rome's highest military honour, spolia opima, but Augustus refused to award it on a technicality. (Note: Crassus' feat, as Roman commander, of killing the enemy leader in combat arguably entitled him to the highest honour a Roman soldier could gain: the spolia opima (literally: "bountiful spoils", but this term may be a corruption of spolia optima, "supreme spoils"), the right to hang the armour stripped from the enemy leader in the temple of Jupiter Feretrius in Rome, in emulation of the Founder of Rome Romulus, a privilege granted only twice previously. But Crassus was denied the honour by Augustus on the technicality that he was not commander-in-chief of Roman forces at the time, a position claimed by Augustus himself. Augustus also forbade Crassus to accept the honorary title of imperator ("supreme commander") from his troops, traditional for victorious generals. Instead, Augustus claimed the title for himself (for the seventh time). Finally, although Dio states that Crassus was voted a Triumph in Rome by the Senate, there is no evidence in inscriptions of that year (27 BC) that it was actually celebrated. After his return to Rome, Crassus disappears from the record altogether, both epigraphic and literary. This is highly unusual in a relatively well-documented period for a person of such distinction who was still only about 33 years old. His tomb has not been found in the excavated Crassus family mausoleum in Rome. This official "air-brushing from history" may imply punitive internal exile to a remote location, similar to that inflicted on the contemporary poet, Ovid, who in AD 8, for an unknown offence, was ordered by Augustus to spend the rest of his life in Tomis (Constanţa) on the Black Sea. Ronald Syme points out the similarity of Crassus' removal from the official record with that of Cornelius Gallus, the contemporary disgraced governor of Egypt, who was recalled by Augustus for assuming inappropriate honours.) Thousands of fleeing Bastarnae perished, many asphyxiated in nearby woods by encircling fires set by the Romans, others drowned trying to swim across the Danube. Nevertheless, a substantial force dug themselves into a powerful hillfort. Crassus laid siege to fort, but had to enlist the assistance of Rholes, a Getan petty king, to dislodge them, for which service Rholes was granted the title of socius et amicus populi Romani ("ally and friend of the Roman people").

The following year (28 BC), Crassus marched on Genucla. Zyraxes escaped with his treasure and fled over the Danube into Scythia to seek aid from the Bastarnae. Before he was able to bring reinforcements, Genucla fell to a combined land and fluvial assault by the Romans. The strategic result of Crassus' campaigns was the permanent annexation of Moesia by Rome.

About a decade later, in 10 BC, the Bastarnae again clashed with Rome during Augustus' conquest of Pannonia (the bellum Pannonicum 14–9 BC). Inscription AE (1905) 14 records a campaign on the Hungarian Plain by the Augustan-era general Marcus Vinucius:

Marcus Vinucius...[patronymic], Consul [in 19 BC]...[various official titles], governor of Illyricum, the first [Roman general] to advance across the river Danube, defeated in battle and routed an army of Dacians and Basternae, and subjugated the Cotini, Osi,...[missing tribal name] and Anartii to the power of the emperor Augustus and of the people of Rome.

Most likely, the Bastarnae, in alliance with Dacians, were attempting to assist the hard-pressed Illyrian/Celtic tribes of Pannonia in their resistance to Rome.

==== First and second centuries ====
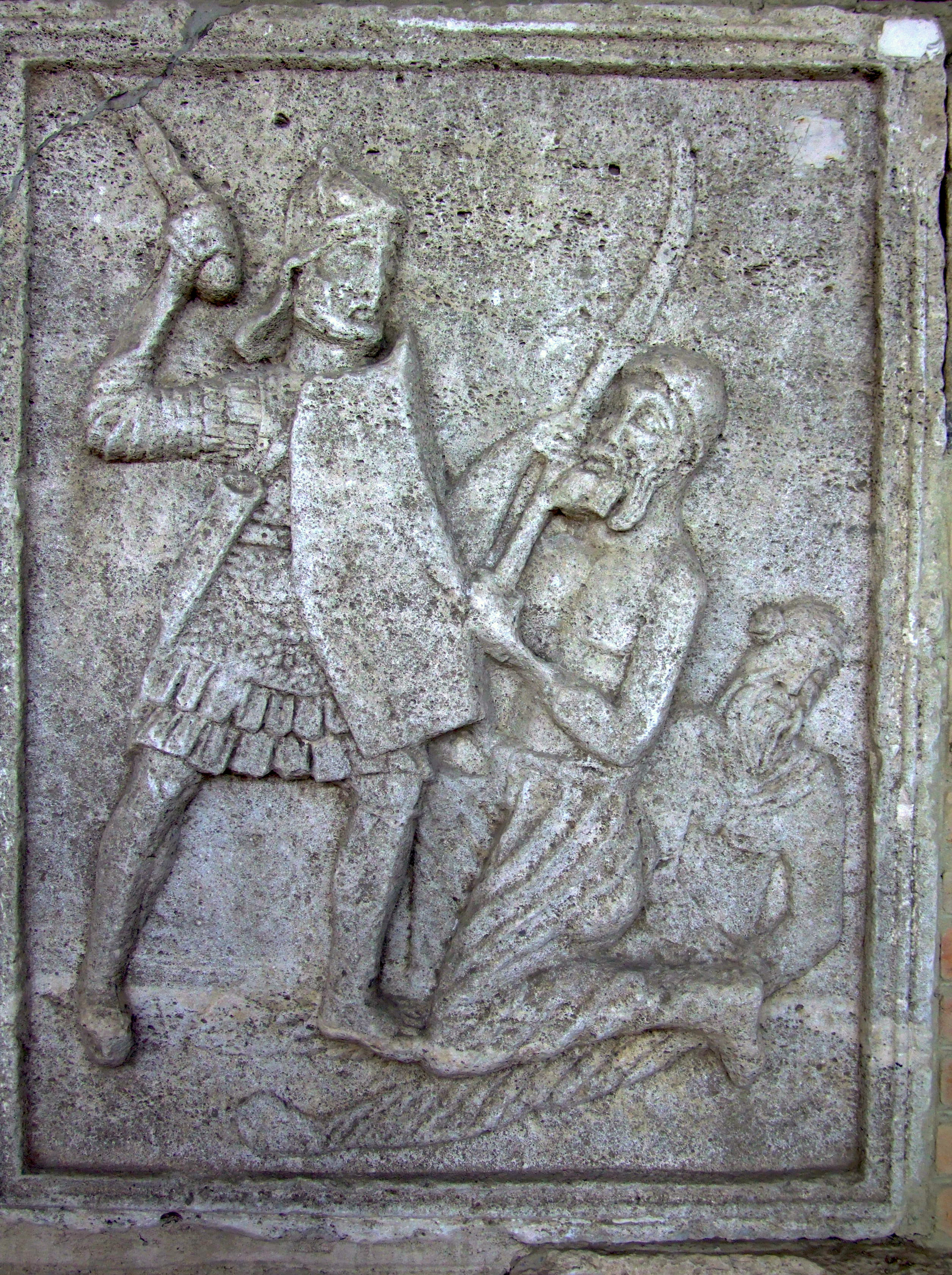
War scene of the Tropaeum Traiani (c. 109 AD): a Roman legionary fighting with a Dacian warrior, while a Germanic warrior (Bastarnae?), who has a suebian knot, is wounded on the ground.

It appears that in the final years of Augustus' rule, the Bastarnae made their peace with Rome. The Res Gestae Divi Augusti ("Acts of the divine Augustus", 14 AD), an inscription commissioned by Augustus to list his achievements, states that he received an embassy from the Bastarnae seeking a treaty of friendship. It appears that a treaty was concluded and apparently proved remarkably effective, as no hostilities with the Bastarnae are recorded in surviving ancient sources until c. 175, some 160 years after Augustus' inscription was carved. But surviving evidence for the history of this period is so thin that it cannot be excluded that the Bastarnae clashed with Rome during it. (Note: The Julio-Claudian period and the subsequent Roman Civil War of 68–9 (until AD 69) is reasonably well-covered by Tacitus' Annales (although substantial parts are missing) and Historiae. But the loss of Tacitus' narrative for the entire Flavian period (69–96) and of Ammianus Marcellinus's continuation until 353, as well as of most of Dio Cassius's History (up to 229), leaves a massive gap in our knowledge of the political history of the early empire, which is only scantily filled by inferior chronicles such as the Historia Augusta, inscriptions and other evidence) The Bastarnae participated in the Dacian Wars of Domitian (86–88) and Trajan (101–102 and 105–106), fighting on both wars on the Dacian side

In the late second century, the Historia Augusta mentions that in the rule of Marcus Aurelius (161–180), an alliance of lower Danube tribes including the Bastarnae, the Sarmatian Roxolani and the Costoboci took advantage of the emperor's difficulties on the upper Danube (the Marcomannic Wars) to invade Roman territory.

==== Third century ====
During the late second century, the main ethnic change in the northern Black Sea region was the immigration, from the Vistula valley in the North, of the Goths and accompanying Germanic tribes such as the Taifali and the Hasdingi, a branch of the Vandal people. This migration was part of a series of major population movements in the European barbaricum (the Roman term for regions outside their empire). The Goths appear to have established a loose political hegemony over the existing tribes in the region.

Under the leadership of the Goths, a series of major invasions of the Roman empire were launched by a grand coalition of lower Danubian tribes from c. 238 onwards. The participation of the Bastarnae in these is likely but largely unspecified, due to Zosimus' and other chroniclers' tendency to lump all these tribes under the general term "Scythians" – meaning all the inhabitants of Scythia, rather than the specific Iranic-speaking people called the Scythians. Thus, in 250–251, the Bastarnae were probably involved in the Gothic and Sarmatian invasions which culminated in the Roman defeat at the Battle of Abrittus and the slaying of Emperor Decius (251). This disaster was the start of the Third Century Crisis of the Roman Empire, a period of military and economic chaos. At this critical moment, the Roman army was crippled by the outbreak of a second smallpox pandemic, the plague of Cyprian (251–70). The effects are described by Zosimus as even worse than the earlier Antonine plague (166–180), which probably killed 15–30% of the empire's inhabitants.

Taking advantage of Roman military disarray, a vast number of barbarian peoples overran much of the empire. The Sarmato-Gothic alliance of the lower Danube carried out major invasions of the Balkans region in 252, and in the periods 253–258 and 260–268. The Peucini Bastarnae are specifically mentioned in the 267/268 invasion, when the coalition built a fleet in the estuary of the river Tyras (Dniester). The Peucini Bastarnae would have been critical to this venture since, as coastal and delta dwellers, they would have had seafaring experience that the nomadic Sarmatians and Goths lacked. The barbarians sailed along the Black Sea coast to Tomis in Moesia Inferior, which they tried to take by assault without success. They then attacked the provincial capital Marcianopolis (Devnya, Bulgaria), also in vain. Sailing on through the Bosporus, the expedition laid siege to Thessalonica in Macedonia. Driven off by Roman forces, the coalition host moved overland into Thracia, where finally it was crushed by Emperor Claudius II (r. 268–270) at Naissus (269).

Claudius II was the first of a sequence of military emperors (the so-called "Illyrian emperors" from their main ethnic origin) who restored order in the empire in the late third century. These emperors followed a policy of large-scale resettlement within the empire of defeated barbarian tribes, granting them land in return for an obligation of military service much heavier than the usual conscription quota. The policy had the triple benefit, from the Roman point of view, of weakening the hostile tribe, repopulating the plague-ravaged frontier provinces (bringing their abandoned fields back into cultivation) and providing a pool of first-rate recruits for the army. It could also be popular with the barbarian prisoners, who were often delighted by the prospect of a land grant within the empire. In the fourth century, such communities were known as laeti.

The emperor Probus (r. 276–282) is recorded as resettling 100,000 Bastarnae in Moesia, in addition to other peoples, including Goths, Gepids and Vandals. The Bastarnae are reported to have honoured their oath of allegiance to the emperor, while the other resettled peoples mutinied while Probus was distracted by usurpation attempts and ravaged the Danubian provinces far and wide. A further massive transfer of Bastarnae was carried out by Emperor Diocletian (ruled 284–305) after he and his colleague Galerius defeated a coalition of Bastarnae and Carpi in 299.

=== Later Roman empire (305 onwards) ===
The remaining transdanubian Bastarnae disappear into historical obscurity in the late empire. Neither of the main ancient sources for this period, Ammianus Marcellinus and Zosimus, mention the Bastarnae in their accounts of the fourth century, possibly implying the loss of their separate identity, presumably assimilated by the regional hegemons, the Goths. Such assimilation would have been facilitated if, as is possible, the Bastarnae spoke an East Germanic language closely related to Gothic. If the Bastarnae remained an identifiable group, it is highly likely that they participated in the vast Gothic-led migration, driven by Hunnic pressure, that was admitted into Moesia by Emperor Valens in 376 and eventually defeated and killed Valens at Adrianople in 378. Although Ammianus refers to the migrants collectively as "Goths", he states that, in addition, "Taifali and other tribes" were involved.

However, after a gap of 150 years, there is a final mention of Bastarnae in the mid-5th century. In 451, the Hunnic leader Attila invaded Gaul with a large army which was ultimately routed at the Battle of Châlons by a Roman-led coalition under the general Aetius. Attila's host, according to Jordanes, included contingents from the "innumerable tribes that had been brought under his sway". This included the Bastarnae, according to the Gallic nobleman Sidonius Apollinaris. However, E.A. Thompson argues that Sidonius' mention of Bastarnae at Chalons is probably false: his purpose was to write a panegyric and not a history, and Sidonius added some spurious names to the list of real participants (e.g. Burgundians, Sciri and Franks) for dramatic effect.

== See also ==
- Carpathian Tumuli culture
- Tiberius Plautius Silvanus Aelianus
- List of Germanic tribes
- List of Celtic tribes

== Bibliography ==
=== Modern ===
- Almassy, Katalin (2006). "Celts and Dacians(?) In the Great Hungarian Plain 1st c. BC to 1st c. AD" (PDF). In Salac, V.; Bemman, J. (eds.). Mitteleuropa in Zeit Marbods. Archived (PDF) from the original on 2022-10-09.
- Babeş, Mircea: Noi date privind arheologia şi istoria bastarnilor in SCIV 20 (1969) 195–218
- Barrington (2000): Atlas of the Greek and Roman World
- Batty, Roger (2008): Rome and the Nomads: the Pontic-Danubian region in Antiquity
- Bowman, Alan K.; Champlin, Edward; Lintott, Andrew, eds. (1996). The Cambridge Ancient History. Vol. 10. Cambridge University Press. ISBN 978-052126430-3.
- Crişan, Ion (1978): Burebista and his Time
- Faliyeyev, Alexander (2007): Dictionary of Continental Celtic Placenames (online)
- Goldsworthy, Adrian (2000): Roman Warfare
- Hussey, Joan Mervyn (1966). Cambridge Medieval History. CUP Archive. ISBN 0-5200-8511-6.
- Heather, Peter (1999). The Visigoths from the Migration Period to the Seventh Century: An Ethnographic Perspective. Boydell & Brewer. ISBN 1-8438-3033-7.
- Heather, Peter (2009): Empires and Barbarians
- Jankuhn, Herbert (1975), "Bastarnen § 5. Archäologisches", in Beck, Heinrich; Geuenich, Dieter; Steuer, Heiko (eds.), Reallexikon der Germanischen Altertumskunde, vol. 2 (2 ed.), De Gruyter, ISBN 978-3-11-006740-8
- Jones, A.H.M. (1964): Later Roman Empire
- Köbler, Gerhard (2000): Indo-Germanisches Wörterbuch (online)
- Müllenhoff, Karl (1887): Deutsche altertumskunde (vol. II)
- Neumann, Günter (1975), "Bastarnen § 1. Sprachliches", in Beck, Heinrich; Geuenich, Dieter; Steuer, Heiko (eds.), Reallexikon der Germanischen Altertumskunde, vol. 2 (2 ed.), De Gruyter, ISBN 978-3-11-006740-8
- Shchukin, Mark (1989). Rome and the Barbarians in Central and Eastern Europe: 1st Century B.C.-1st Century A.D. B.A.R. ISBN 978-0-86054-690-0.
- Thompson, E.A. (1996): The Huns
- Todd, Malcolm (2004): The early Germans
- O. N. Trubačev (1999): INDOARICA в Северном Причерноморье
- Waldman, Carl; Mason, Catherine (2006). Encyclopedia of European Peoples. Infobase Publishing. ISBN 1-4381-2918-1.
- Wenskus, Reinhard (1975), "Bastarnen § 2-4", in Beck, Heinrich; Geuenich, Dieter; Steuer, Heiko (eds.), Reallexikon der Germanischen Altertumskunde, vol. 2 (2 ed.), De Gruyter, ISBN 978-3-11-006740-8
- Wolfram, Herwig (1988): History of the Goths

=== Ancient ===
- Res Gestae Divi Augusti (c. 14 AD)
- Ammianus Marcellinus Res Gestae (c. 395 AD)
- Dio Cassius Roman History (c. 230 AD)
- Eutropius Historiae Romanae Breviarium (c. 360 AD)
- Anonymous Historia Augusta (c. 400 AD)
- Livy Ab urbe condita (c. 20 BC)
- Jordanes Getica (c. 550 AD)
- Pliny the Elder Naturalis Historia (c. 70 AD)
- Ptolemy Geographia (c. 140)
- Sextus Aurelius Victor De Caesaribus (c. 380 AD)
- Sidonius Apollinaris Carmina (late fifth century AD)
- Strabo Geographica (c. 10 AD)
- Tacitus Annales (c. 100 AD)
- Tacitus Germania (c. 100 AD)
- Zosimus Historia Nova (c. 500 AD)
