= Liptovská Mara =

Reservoir in Slovakia

Coordinates: 49°05′55″N 19°29′20″E

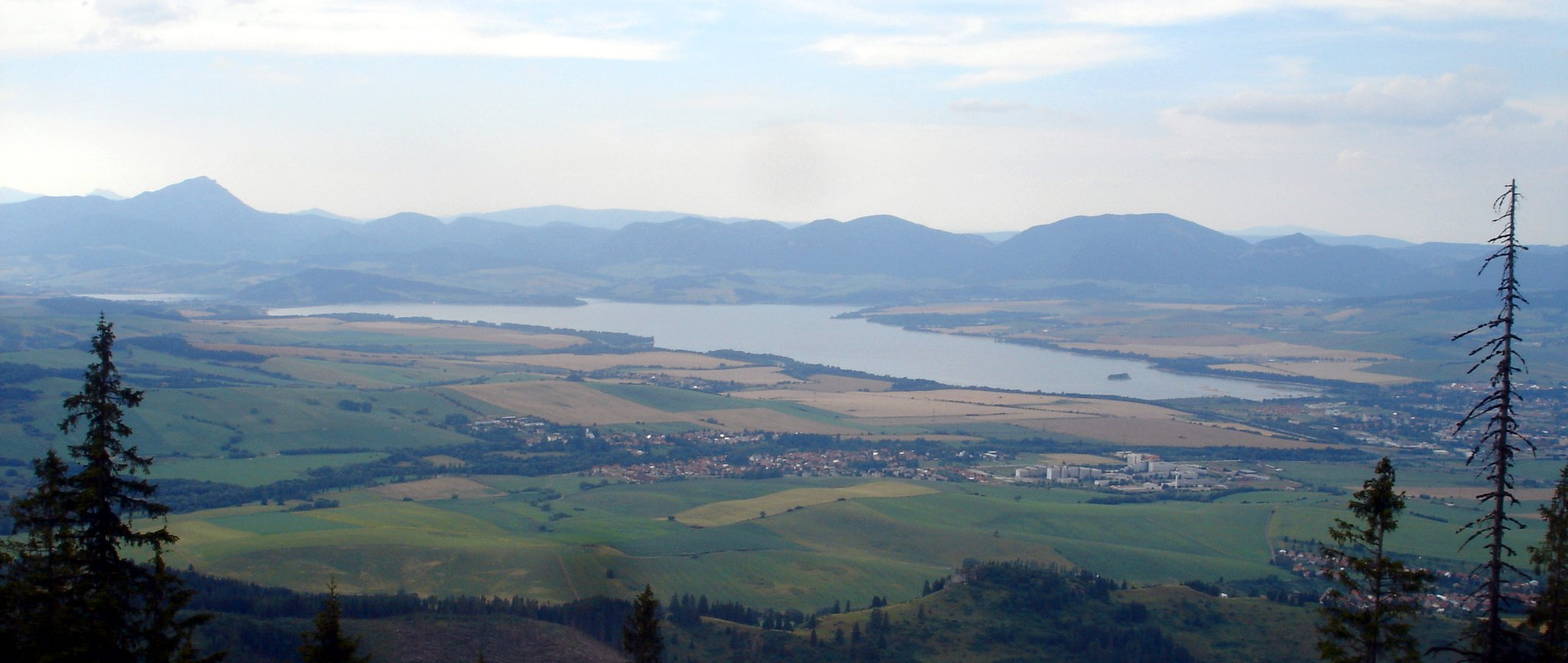
Liptovská Mara from Low Tatras (from south)

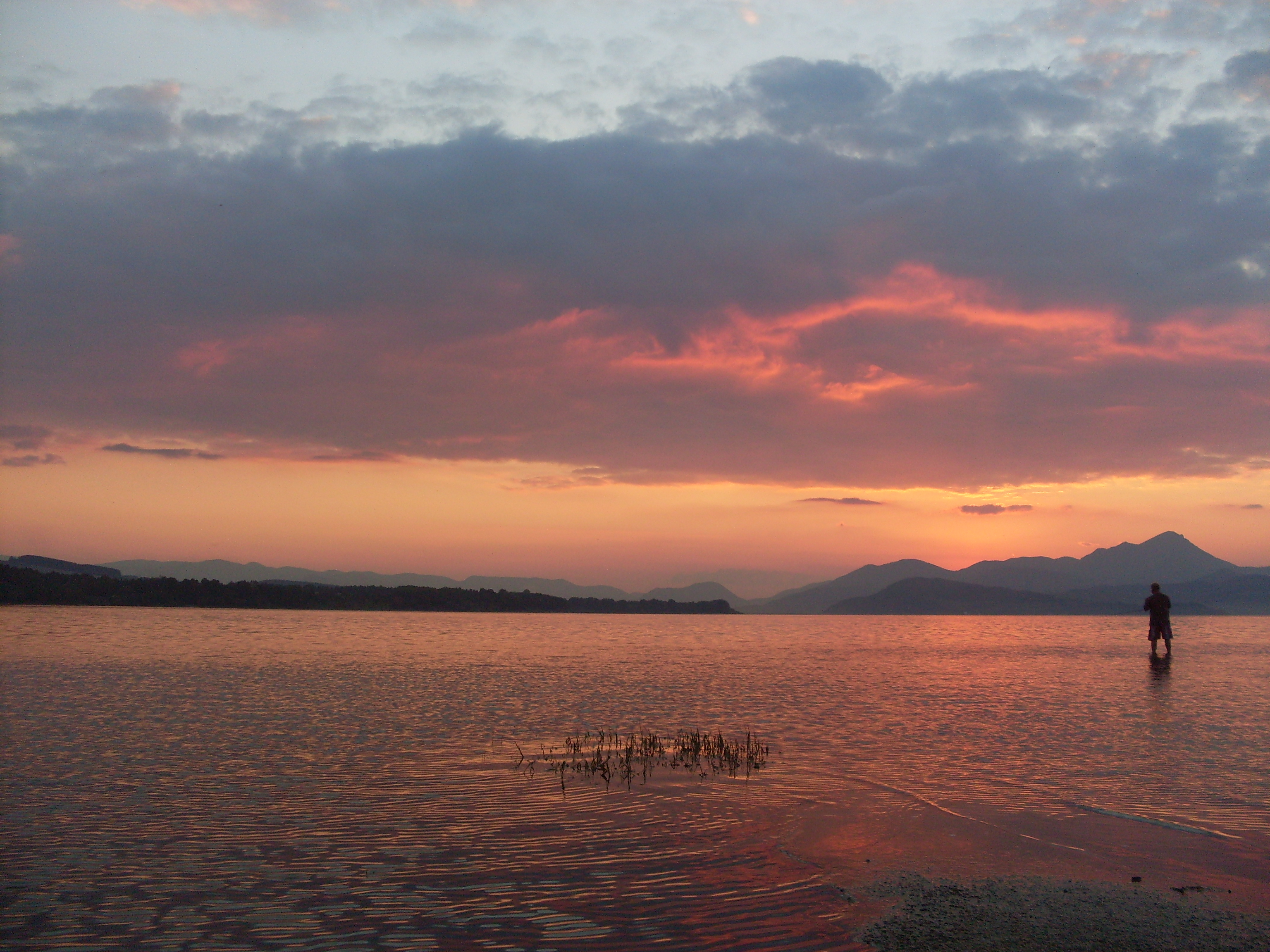
Liptovská Mara

Map of the Liptovská Mara, with old settlements and path of the road and railway line highlighted

Liptovská Mara (Slovak pronunciation: [ˈliptɔwskaː ˈmara]) is a reservoir in northern Slovakia, on the Váh river near Liptovský Mikuláš, in the Liptov region. The dam is named after one of the inundated villages.

It was built in 1965–1975. The area of the reservoir is 22 km^{2}, max. depth is 45 m and the capacity is 360 milillion m^{3}. During construction, thirteen villages were inundated and a major railway and road relocated. The main purpose of this dam is to prevent floods, although it also generates electricity.

Today, the dam is used as a recreational site. The reconstructed Celtic oppidum Havránok is situated on a hill above the dam.
