= Basterna =

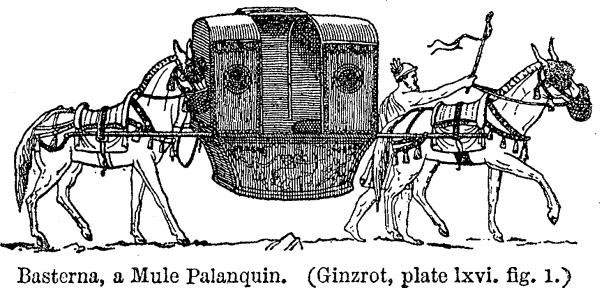
A basterna as illustrated in A Dictionary of Greek and Roman Antiquities by William Smith

A basterna was a kind of vehicle, or litter, in which Ancient Roman women were carried. It appears to have resembled the lectica; and the only difference apparently was, that the lectica was carried on the shoulders of slaves, and the basterna by two mules, according to Isaac Casaubon. Several etymologies of the word have been proposed. Salmasius proposes it to be derived from the Greek βαστάζω (Salm. ad Lamprid. Heliog. 21). Cassius Dio links it to the people known as the Bastarnae, living in what is now southern Ukraine.. A description of a basterna is given by a poet in the Anth. Lat. iii. 183.

Others call it a kind of chariot, and say it was drawn by oxen to go more gently. Gregory de Tours gives an instance of it being carried by wild bulls.

The interior was called cavea, 'cage'; and it had soft cushions or beds. The mode of basterna's passed from Italy into Gaul, and then into other countries. Modern coach or stagecoach transportation has its origins in the basterna.
