= Osi (tribe) =

Ancient people of the middle Danube region

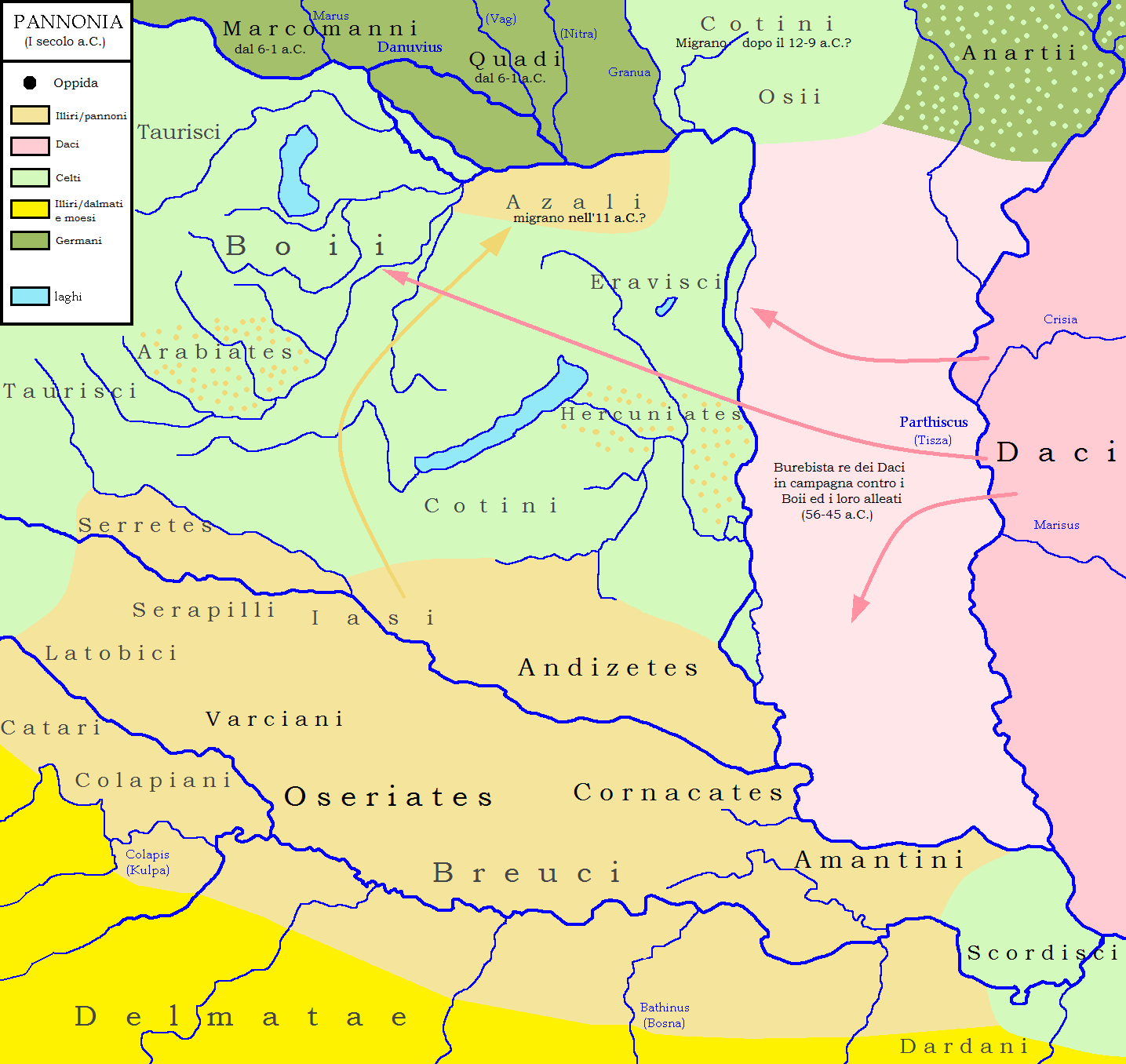
Ancient tribes around 1 AD; the Osii are to be seen near the top centre of the map

The Osi were an ancient people of the middle Danube region, living north of the river behind the Marcomanni and the Quadi, in the area of modern south-western Slovakia. They are known almost entirely from the Germania of Tacitus, who records that they spoke the lingua Pannonica and that, with their neighbours the Cotini, they paid tribute to the Quadi and the Sarmatians. Their ethnic and linguistic affiliation has been disputed, some scholars reading Tacitus's notice at face value and others holding the Osi to have belonged to the Celtic population of the northern Carpathian region. They remained outside the Roman Empire and were progressively Dacianized during the first and second centuries AD.

== Name ==
The Osi are named almost exclusively by Tacitus, in his Germania. Identifications of the name in other records are contested. An honorific inscription from Tusculum commemorating a Danubian campaign of Marcus Vinicius names the Osi, with the Cotini and the Anartii, among the peoples forced to acknowledge Roman authority, although the ethnonym there is a restoration. The station Osones of the Antonine Itinerary and the title praepositus gentis Onsorum held by a Roman officer have also been connected with the Osi, but neither equation is secure.

== Ethnic identity ==
Tacitus's lingua Pannonica is the only ancient mention of such a language, and its interpretation has divided scholarship. Earlier writers took the term to mean Illyrian and, because Tacitus links the Osi with the Eravisci, inferred that both peoples were Illyrian. András Mócsy argued instead that the Eraviscan personal names are thoroughly Celtic and that the lingua Pannonica is an inference of Tacitus's own rather than a distinct language: holding the Rhine and the Danube to be linguistic boundaries, Tacitus had to account for the shared speech of the Osi and the Eravisci on either bank, and, finding in his main source, the lost German history of Pliny the Elder, only that the two peoples spoke the same tongue, he posited a separate Pannonian language and ascribed it to the Osi. On this view the Osi, the Cotini and the Eravisci had originally formed one Celtic group, divided only in the first century AD. Péter Kovács similarly treats the remark as Tacitus's own and warns against drawing ethnic conclusions from it. (Note: Kovács suggests the term may rest on a confusion between the adjectives Pannon and Pannonian, so that the lingua Pannonica need not denote the language of provincial Pannonia.) Alexander Falileyev, by contrast, keeps the Osi as the non-Celtic, Pannonian member of the pair, noting that a form of Pannonian or Illyrian was probably spoken near the Danube and that the affiliation of the Osi has been judged variously.

== Geography ==
In chapter 43 of Germania, Tacitus places them, together with the Marsigni, the Cotini and the Buri, behind the Marcomanni and the Quadi, and states that the Cotini spoke a Gaulish tongue and the Osi a Pannonian one, which in his view proved that neither was Germanic. In chapter 28 the Osi are linked with the Eravisci, on the far bank of the Danube, as speakers of the same language.

The Osi lay north of the middle Danube, on the great bend of the river at the northern edge of the Great Hungarian Plain, in the territory of modern south-western Slovakia. They were settled behind the Marcomanni and the Quadi, between the Germani and the Sarmatians. Their neighbours to the east were the Cotini, the Anartes and the Taurisci, and across the Danube to the south the Eravisci.

Whether any of the Osi were ever settled within the Roman province of Pannonia is uncertain. A place-name Osones (Osonibus) in north-eastern Pannonia has been read as evidence that some, neighbours of the resettled Cotini, were established there, but the identification is doubted and most of the tribe are thought to have remained beyond the frontier.

== History ==
=== Origins ===
According to András Mócsy, in the late Iron Age the Osi were among the Celtic peoples along the northern edge of the Hungarian plain, in the zone of contact between Celts and Dacians that ran through the middle of the Carpathian region. Mócsy regarded the Osi, the Cotini and the Eravisci as branches of a single Celtic group later divided by circumstance. After the expansion of the Dacian king Burebista about the middle of the 1st century BC, the Osi, the Cotini, the Taurisci and the Anartii were probably allies or subjects of the Dacians.

=== Roman contact ===
The Osi came into contact with Rome as Illyricum was being organised under Augustus. About 10 BC to AD 1 the legate Marcus Vinicius crossed the Danube, defeated the Dacians and the Bastarnae, and compelled the peoples of the plain, among them the Cotini, the Osi and the Anartii, to acknowledge Roman authority.

When the client kingdom of Vannius, a Quadic prince set up under Roman patronage, was established north of Pannonia in the first half of the first century AD, the Osi and the Cotini may have been among the neighbouring peoples made tributary to him. The Osi paid tribute partly to the Sarmatians and partly to the Quadi, who exacted it from them as foreigners. Péter Kovács has taken this tributary relationship as evidence for placing the Vannian kingdom east of the Marus.

=== Marcomannic Wars and later ===
During the Marcomannic Wars of Marcus Aurelius the Cotini were brought into the empire, but the Osi continued to live beyond the frontier. Attempts have been made to associate the Osi, together with the Cotini, with the Púchov culture of the northern Carpathians, though the correlation of a material culture with a named people is treated with caution. The population of the region was progressively Dacianized, and by the early second century AD many of its people bore Dacian names.
