= Havránok =

Archaeological site in Slovakia

Coordinates: 49°6′17″N 19°28′54″E

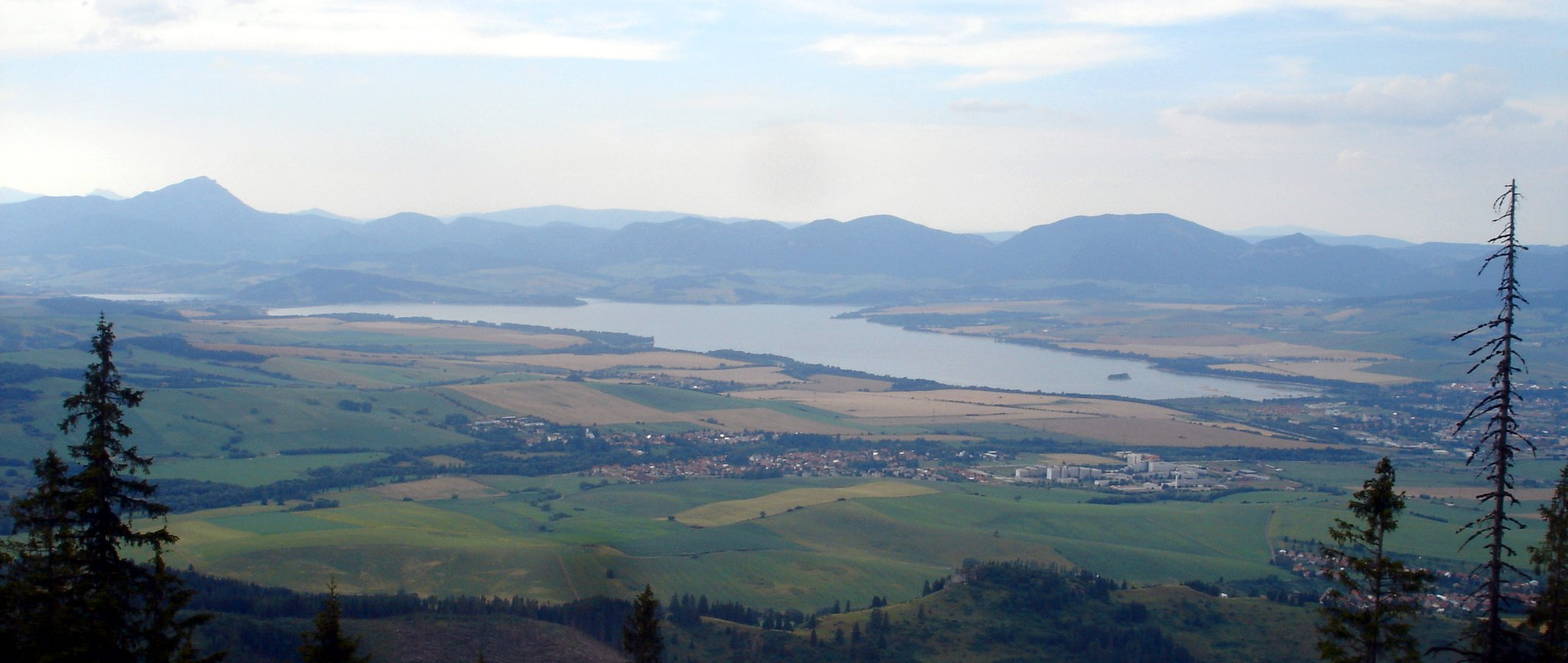
Since 1975 Havránok overlooks the Liptovská Mara reservoir

Havránok is an important archaeological site in northern Slovakia. It is on a hill above the Liptovská Mara water reservoir around 2 km (1.2 mi) from the village of Bobrovník, about halfway between Ružomberok and Liptovský Mikuláš in the Liptov region. The archaeologists unearthed a prehistoric Celtic hill fort and a medieval wooden castle in the 1960s, during the construction of the Liptovská Mara dam. Both objects have been partially reconstructed. During the Iron Age and the Roman Era, the shrine of Havránok was an important religious center of the Celts living in Slovakia.

== History ==
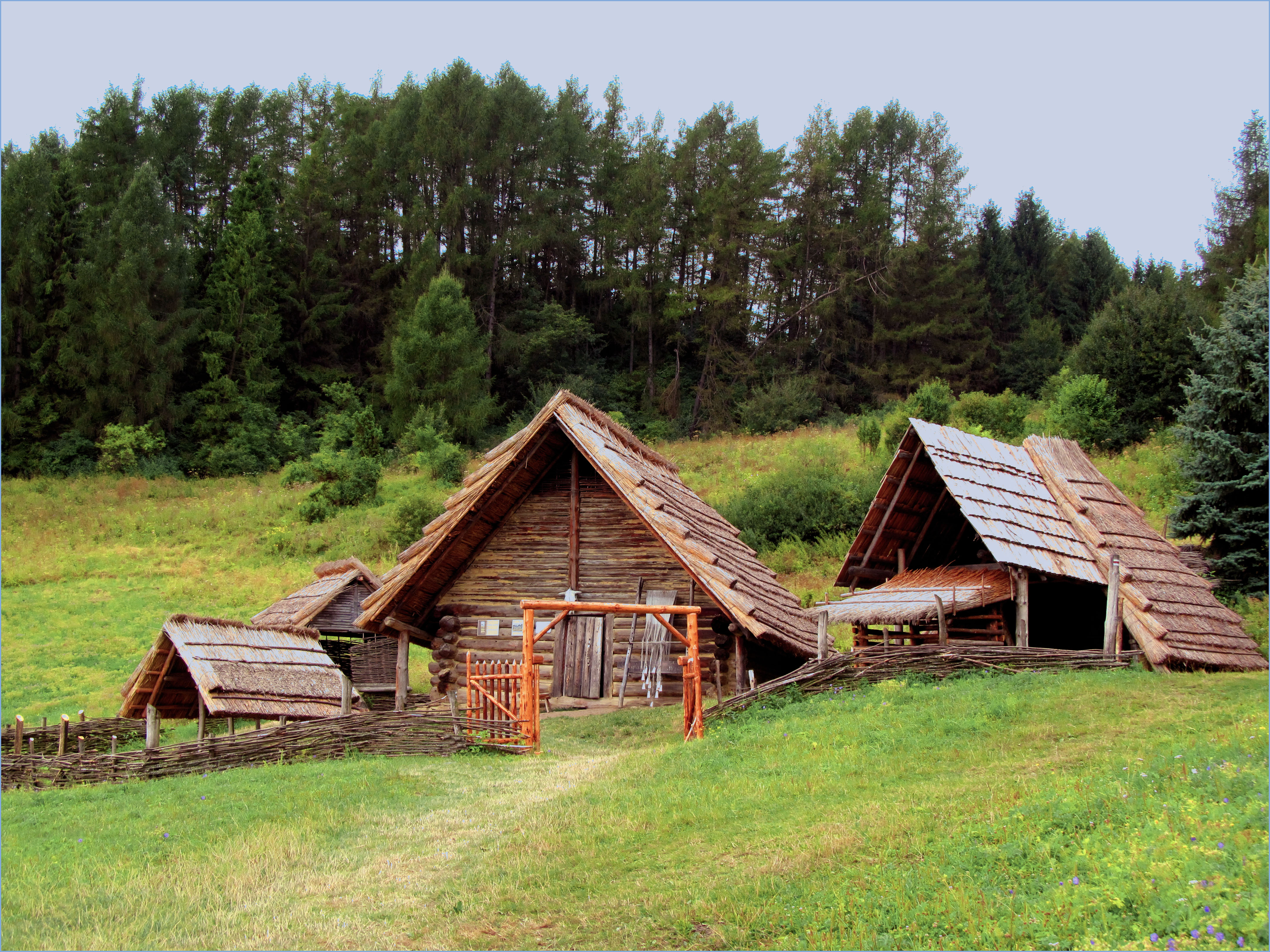
Open-Air Archaeological Museum Liptovska Mara - Havranok, Slovakia, Reconstructed shape of a farmstead from the Upper Iron Age (300-100 B.C.)

The Havránok hill fort was an important religious, economic, and political center of the Púchov culture (300 BCE - 180 CE), in which the dominant Celtic tribe of Cotini mingled with the older people of the Lusatian culture. The prosperous oppidum was destroyed along with other Celtic settlements in Slovakia around the beginning of the Common Era either by the Germanic tribe of Quadi or by Dacians.

A medieval wooden castle existed near the remnants of the ancient hill fort from the 11th to 15th century CE.

== Celtic shrine ==
The hill fort was a religious center of the Celts living in northern Slovakia. Its wooden shrine was built in the 1st century BCE around an exceptionally high wooden column, probably a totem or a statue.

Excavation of a ritual pit situated near this central cult object revealed bones of at least seven people sacrificed during druidic rituals. The victims were beaten to death, quartered, and in some cases also burnt. Parts of their bodies were subsequently thrown into the pit. A large number of agricultural tools in the vicinity of the pit indicate that human sacrifices may have served to insure a good harvest.

The shrine also included a number of smaller wooden columns, with burnt offerings (mostly jewels, agricultural products, and animals) buried next to them.

== Other buildings ==
In addition to the shrine, the reconstructed buildings include a fortified gateway of the hill fort with a section of the stone walls (120-50 BCE), farmstead (300-100 BCE), a pottery kiln (300-100 BCE), and huts from various periods.

In the Iron Age and the Roman Era, Havránok was surrounded by several Celtic villages. Some of them were inundated by the Liptovská Mara reservoir.

The small medieval castle is also partially reconstructed and the whole area of Havránok is now an open-air museum. The site was proclaimed a national cultural monument in 1967.

== Economy ==
The Celts of Havránok minted their own coins. However, the simple copper coins could not equal the quality of the contemporary silver Biatecs, minted by the Boii in Bratislava.

== See also ==
- Celts and human sacrifice
- Cotini
