= Púchov culture =

Archaeological culture in Slovakia

The Púchov culture is an archaeological culture named after site of Púchov-Skalka in Slovakia. It was most likely founded by the Celtic Cotini and/or Anartes tribes. Púchov culture is primarily evidenced in northern and central Slovakia, though it may have spread to surrounding areas, during the 2nd century BCE and the 1st century CE.

== Characteristics ==
The Púchov culture developed from the Lusatian culture and it was influenced later by the Illyrian culture, the Celts, and by the beginning of the Christian era, the Dacians. Settlements were situated on moderate hill sides and near streams. The largest known religious, economic, and political center of the Púchov culture was the hill-fort of Havránok, famous for its traces of human sacrifice.

== Disappearance ==
As a result of the Dacian and Germanic tribal expansionism at the beginning of the Common Era, the Púchov culture and its settlements began to decline, and the people were eventually assimilated into Dacian and other migrating tribes.

== See also ==
- Anartes
- Dacian-Celtic relations
