= Cotini =

Ancient Celtic people of the Carpathians

The Cotini (also Gotini) were an ancient Celtic people of the northern part of the Carpathian basin, in the mountainous regions of present-day Slovakia. They are recorded by Tacitus, Ptolemy and Cassius Dio, and in Latin inscriptions, between the reign of Augustus and the middle of the 3rd century AD. Subject to the Quadi and noted as ironworkers, they were a Celtic-speaking people, unlike their neighbours the Osi. After the Marcomannic Wars part of the people was resettled within Pannonia, where their descendants are attested as cives Cotini.

== Name ==
The Cotini are named by Tacitus, as Cotini with the variant reading got(h)ini, as Kōgnoi (Κῶγνοι, with the variants Κόρνοι and Κόνοι, in Germania Superior) and Kytnoi (Κύτνοι; a resettled community in Pannonia Superior) by Ptolemy, and as Kotinoi (Κοτινοί) by Cassius Dio. The name also appears in several Latin inscriptions.

If of Celtic origin, the name has been derived from a stem *cot(t)o- and explained as 'the old ones', a sense compared with that of the Senones (from *seno-, 'old'). A Celtic interpretation is generally preferred, on the strength of Tacitus's statement about the people's language. Two non-Celtic interpretations have also been advanced. Peter Anreiter traces the name instead to a Pannonian kōtiā ('dwelling, hut'), from Proto-Indo-European *kōt-. A Dacian origin, suggested by Zsolt Visy, has been rejected as resting on probably unrelated forms, while the variant reading got(h)ini has prompted attempts to connect the name with Germanic.

The principal evidence for the Celtic character of the Cotini is the statement of Tacitus that they spoke Gallica lingua (Celtic), in contrast to the Pannonica of the neighbouring Osi.

== Geography ==
The Cotini lived in the northern part of the Carpathian basin, in the mountainous country of central and northern Slovakia about the upper Váh. An older view placing them, with other Celtic groups, in the territory of modern Poland is no longer accepted, although small enclaves there have been discussed.

They were subject to the Quadi, and paid tribute also to the Sarmatians. Together with the Osi, the Eravisci, the Anarti and the Teurisci they have been regarded as forming a single Celtic group of the northern Carpathian region. The community later settled within Pannonia cannot be located precisely, the most likely area being south of Lake Pelso, between the Azali and the Iasi. After the Marcomannic Wars a group of Cotini was placed around Mursa and Cibalae.

== History ==
=== Origins and early history ===
The Cotini belonged to a group of Celtic peoples of the northern Carpathian region that also included the Osi, the Eravisci and the Anarti. In the course of the 1st century AD this group was separated. The Cotini and Osi, left outside the empire, came under the control of the Quadi and the Sarmatians and were gradually Dacianised, whereas the Eravisci, under Roman rule, retained their Celtic language and culture.

The earliest secure notice of the people is the so-called Elogium of Tusculum, which records that a Roman commander defeated and routed the Cotini, together with the Osi and the Anarti, in a campaign across the Danube under Augustus. (Note: Kovács identifies the commander as Marcus Vinicius. The inscription itself does not name him.) The Cotini worked iron and were tributaries of the Quadi and the Sarmatians. By the time they were incorporated into the empire most of them bore Dacian names.

=== Marcomannic Wars and resettlement ===
During the Marcomannic Wars the Cotini submitted to Rome and, in 171, became allies together with the Vandals. Roman troops under the command of Tarrutenius Paternus were stationed in their territory in order to attack the Marcomanni to the west. The Cotini broke the agreement and maltreated the commander, and were in consequence defeated and resettled in Pannonia. The "rain miracle" of the war was located by later tradition in the land of the Cotini.

=== In Roman Pannonia ===
A civitas Cotinorum was organised in the course of the 1st century AD, probably south of Lake Pelso. The Cotini settled around Mursa and Cibalae bore, for the most part, Daco-Thracian names. Their descendants served in the Praetorian Guard and described themselves as cives Cotini on inscriptions set up at Rome, in 223 (CIL VI, 32542 and 32544) and still under Decius (CIL VI, 32557), although it is uncertain whether all of these were of indigenous Pannonian descent.

== Material culture ==
The homeland of the Cotini has long been identified with the area of the Púchov culture of the mountainous regions of Slovakia, a late La Tène facies that continued into the Roman period. In his study of that culture Karol Pieta cautioned against a simple equation of the people with the material culture, on the grounds that the Cotini cannot be shown to have been the only bearers of La Tène material culture in the Slovak mountains, that much of the Púchov area remains unexcavated, and that the identification of an ethnic group with a particular material culture is in general unsafe.
