= Bobrovník =

Village and municipality in Slovakia

- Municipality
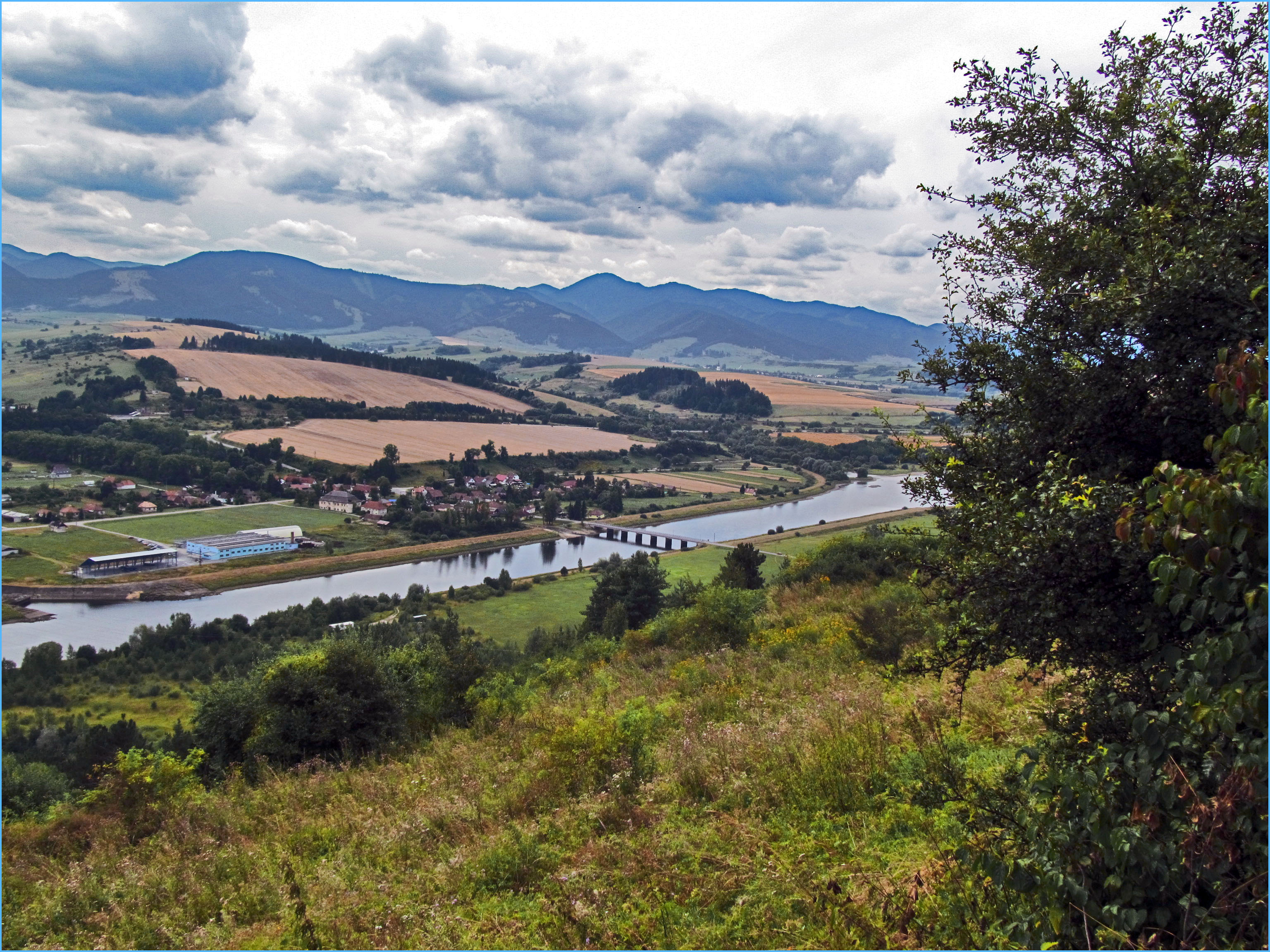

- Flag

- Location of Bobrovník in the Žilina Region Location of Bobrovník in Slovakia
- Coordinates: 49.12°N 19.48°E
- Country: Slovakia
- Region: Žilina Region
- District: Liptovský Mikuláš District
- First mentioned: 1273

Area
  - Total: 6.77 km^{2} (2.61 sq mi)
- Elevation: 595 m (1,952 ft)

Population (2025)
  - Total: 121
- Time zone: UTC+1 (CET)
  - Summer (DST): UTC+2 (CEST)
- Postal code: 322 3
- Area code: +421 44
- Vehicle registration plate (until 2022): LM
- Website: www.obecbobrovnik.sk

Bobrovník (Hungarian: Bobrovnik) is a village and municipality in Liptovský Mikuláš District in the Žilina Region of northern Slovakia.

== History ==
In historical records the village was first mentioned in 1273. Before the establishment of independent Czechoslovakia in 1918, it was part of Liptó County within the Kingdom of Hungary. From 1939 to 1945, it was part of the Slovak Republic.

== Geography ==
The municipality lies at an altitude of 595 metres (1,952 ft) and covers an area of 6.77 km^{2} (2.61 sq mi) (2025).

== Population ==
Population statistic (10 years)
Year	1995	2005	2015	2025
Count	150	135	129	121
Difference		−10%	−4.44%	−6.20%

Population statistic
Year	2024	2025
Count	123	121
Difference		−1.62%

It has a population of 121 people (31 December 2025).

=== Ethnicity ===
Census 2021 (1+ %)
Ethnicity	Number	Fraction
Slovak	127	96.21%
Not found out	8	6.06%
Rusyn	2	1.51%
Total	132	

In year 2021 was 132 people by ethnicity 127 as Slovak, 8 as Not found out, 2 as Rusyn and 1 as Czech.

Note on population: The difference values of population numbers in the table "Population statistic" and in the sections "Ethnicity" & "Religion" is caused by the use of various statistical methods.

=== Religion ===
Census 2021 (1+ %)
Religion	Number	Fraction
None	50	37.88%
Roman Catholic Church	39	29.55%
Evangelical Church	31	23.48%
Not found out	5	3.79%
Greek Catholic Church	4	3.03%
Eastern Orthodox Church	2	1.52%
Total	132	

In year 2021 was 132 people by religion 50 from None, 39 from Roman Catholic Church, 31 from Evangelical Church, 5 from Not found out, 4 from Greek Catholic Church, 2 from Eastern Orthodox Church and 1 from Jewish community.

== Sights ==
The Havránok open-air museum with a reconstructed Celtic hill fort is situated 2 km from the village.

== Genealogical resources ==
The records for genealogical research are available at the state archive "Statny Archiv in Bytca, Slovakia"

- Roman Catholic church records (births/marriages/deaths): 1764-1918 (parish B)

== See also ==
- List of municipalities and towns in Slovakia

== External links/Sources ==
- Surnames of living people in Bobrovnik
