= Anartes =

Ancient people of Dacia

The Anarti (also Anartes, Anartii or Anartoi; Ancient Greek: Ἄναρτοι) were an ancient people of the north-western part of Dacia, in a region corresponding to modern north-western Romania and the adjacent parts of Slovakia and Hungary. They are recorded by Caesar, by Ptolemy and in Latin inscriptions dating from the late 1st century BC to the mid-3rd century AD. They are generally regarded as Celtic, though several scholars consider them a Celticised Dacian population. A group bearing a related name, the Anartophracti (or Anartofracti), is placed by Ptolemy to the north, beyond the Carpathians.

== Name ==
The tribe is recorded by Caesar, who places them at the eastern edge of the Hercynian Forest, along the Danube on the borders of the Dacians (ad fines Dacorum et Anartium), and by Ptolemy as Anartoi (Ἄναρτοι; variant Enartoi, Ἐνάρτοι, in later manuscripts), as well as in several inscriptions. A group bearing a related name, the Anartophracti (Ἀναρτοφράκτοι), is recorded only by Ptolemy.

The name has long been regarded as Celtic. It has occasionally been analysed as Iranian and, more rarely, as Dacian, but a Celtic derivation is generally preferred, though Patrick Sims-Williams regards its Celtic character as uncertain. According to Alexander Falileyev, it may be a suffixal derivation in *-rt-, or a compound An-arti- formed with the Gaulish *artos ('bear').

== Geography ==
Caesar and Ptolemy place the Anarti in the north-west of Dacia, and the tribe is left unlocated in the Barrington Atlas. Its precise position is disputed. Ioana Bogdan-Cătăniciu rejected an earlier localisation in the area of Satu Mare and took the Criș as the southern limit of the tribe's territory. Gábor Vékony placed them between the Mureș and the Someș. Venceslas Kruta placed them in the mountainous country north-east of the Danube, on the borders of Slovakia and Hungary. Marek Olędzki argued for the upper Tisza basin. On the available evidence the tribe can be assigned only broadly to western Romania and Slovakia.

An earlier hypothesis that the Anarti themselves, together with the Boii and the Volcae, had settled in parts of modern Poland has been rejected by later scholarship.

== History ==
The north-western edge of Dacia and the adjoining upper Tisza basin were settled by Celtic groups moving in from Central Europe from the early 3rd century BC, who introduced La Tène technologies and forms. Most of these sites declined by the late 2nd or early 1st century BC, though some survived the campaigns of the Dacian king Burebista around the middle of the 1st century BC.

Whether the Anarti themselves belong to this early horizon is disputed. Alexander Falileyev identifies them with the La Tène population present from about 340/320 BC, which disappears from the archaeological record by about 170 BC. Finding no sign that they were absorbed locally, he explains their disappearance as an exodus, possibly linked to the emergence of Celtic-speaking groups in the Dniester region in the 3rd century BC and, in turn, to the Galatai who threatened the Greek colony of Olbia. Tomasz Bochnak, by contrast, finds no basis for connecting the Anarti with the La Tène horizons of the 3rd or 2nd century BC and dates all the written evidence for them to between the mid-1st century BC and the 240s AD.

In the historical record the Anarti first appear around the middle of the 1st century BC, as neighbours of the Dacians, who had by then taken over the former territory of the Boii. The Elogium of Tusculum (about 19–10 BC) names them, with the Bastarni and the Dacians, among the peoples raiding Pannonia whom a Roman legate subdued in a campaign across the Danube. Under the Empire the name recurs in inscriptions from Pannonia and Dacia down to the 240s AD, the later Anarti being generally taken for Romanised descendants of the earlier population. A separate view holds that part of the Anarti, with the neighbouring Teurisci, moved eastwards into Transylvania and were assimilated by the Dacians.

== Ethnic affiliation ==
=== Anarti ===
The ethnic character of the Anarti is debated. The name is generally taken as Celtic, and Caesar distinguished the Anarti from the Dacians, which has been read as setting them apart as a separate people. András Mócsy, followed by Zsolt Mráv and Katalin Ottományi, treated the Celtic personal names Eppo and Utta on a funerary inscription from Aquincum as evidence for the people's Celtic identity: the stele is that of Iulia Utta Florina, daughter of Eppo, recorded as natione Anarti(a) ('an Anartian by birth').

Others regard the Anarti as a Celticised Dacian population, or as Celts who came under strong Dacian influence. Gennadii Kazakevich describes the Anarti and the neighbouring Teurisci as a "Celticised Dacian" group associated with the hill-forts of Mala Kopania and Zemplín, on which reading the Anarti named in the 3rd-century inscriptions are Romanised descendants of that population. On balance, they have been characterised as a people of Celtic tradition that came increasingly under Dacian influence during the 1st century BC.

=== Anartophracti ===
In his account of European Sarmatia, Ptolemy records the Anartophracti (Ἀναρτοφράκτοι), among the peoples between the sources of the Vistula and the Carpathians. Although transmitted by Ptolemy in Greek, the name is a hybrid: the ethnic root Anarto- is joined to the Latin fracti ('broken'), so that the compound denotes a detached or splinter group of the Anarti. This Latin element indicates that the name reached Ptolemy through a Roman rather than a Greek source. Since Roman interest in Dacia began only in the second half of the 1st century BC, as the Dacian kingdom expanded under Burebista, the name can be no older than that.

Marek Olędzki connected the Anartophracti with the La Tène settlement of the upper San basin in south-eastern Poland, understood as an offshoot of the Anarti of the upper Tisza. This identification has been questioned. Tomasz Bochnak argues that Ptolemy's text does not place the Anartophracti on the upper San and that their seats may rather have lain in the upper Dniester basin. Sorin Nemeti and others have treated Anartophracti as no more than a doublet of the name Anarti.

== Settlements ==
Vicus Anartorum, named after the tribe, is attested on a milestone from Almașu Mare (CIL III 8060, dated 236 AD). The usual reading vico An[artorum] is widely accepted, but the last letters are damaged and Ioan Piso and Dan Deac have proposed instead vico Au[relianus]. As none of the inscriptions naming the Anarti comes from northern Dacia, where their main seats are usually placed, the settlement has been interpreted as a small community, perhaps of people resettled from the north.

Other place-names of the area have been taken as Celtic, among them Certia (modern Romița), and Rucconion (modern Bologa), the latter known only from Ptolemy. A second attestation of Rucconion has been proposed in a recently published inscription from Jebucu.
