= Kruševo (disambiguation) =

Kruševo is a town in North Macedonia.

Kruševo or Krushevo may also refer to:

== Bosnia and Herzegovina ==
- Kruševo, Foča
- Kruševo, Olovo
- Kruševo, Stolac

== Bulgaria ==
- Krushevo, Blagoevgrad Province
- Krushevo, Gabrovo Province
- Krushevo, Plovdiv Province, a settlement in Parvomay Municipality
- Old name of Beloslav

== Croatia ==
- Kruševo, Zadar County, a village near Obrovac, Croatia
- Kruševo, Šibenik-Knin County, a village near Primošten, Croatia
- Kruševo, Požega-Slavonia County, a former village near Brestovac, Croatia

== Greece ==
- Old name of Achladochori, Serres
- Krushevo, Soufli

== Montenegro ==
- Kruševo, Gusinje
- Kruševo, Pljevlja

== North Macedonia ==
- Kruševo, Vinica, a village near Vinica

== Serbia ==
- Kruševo, Velika Plana, a hamlet of the village of Veliko Orašje, Serbia
- Kruševo (Prijepolje), a village in Serbia
