= Proposed Illyrian vocabulary =

Hypothetical reconstruction of Illyrian

This article contains information about Illyrian vocabulary. No Illyrian texts survive, so sources for identifying Illyrian words have been identified by Hans Krahe as being of four kinds: inscriptions, glosses of Illyrian words in classical texts, names—including proper names (mostly inscribed on tombstones), toponyms and river names—and Illyrian loanwords in other languages. The last category has proven particularly contentious. The names occur in sources that range over more than a millennium, including numismatic evidence, as well as posited original forms of placenames. Messapic, an ancient language of Apulia which was of Balkan provenance and is grouped in the 'Illyric branch' of the Indo-European family, does have an epigraphic corpus, and some words have been recorded by ancient authors. Messapic words and relevant etymologies are listed in Messapic language#Lexicon.

== Proposed etymologies ==
=== Illyrian lemmas ===
This is a list of lemmas explicitly mentioned as Illyrian by classical authors.

Lemma	Attestation	English meaning	PIE etymology	Proposed cognates
bra (βρα)	Hesychius: <βρα>· ἀδελφοί, ὑπὸ Ἰλλυρίων	"brother"	PIE *bʰréh₂tēr	Alb. vëlla/vllâ "brother", Germ. "Bruder", Eng. "brother"
deuádai (Δευάδαι)	Hesychius: <Δευάδαι>· οἱ Σάτοι, παρὰ Ἰλλυρίων	"satyrs"	PIE *dʰu̯ésmi	Alb. dash "ram", Skt. dhūnoti "he shakes", Gk. thýein "to rage, seethe", théeion "sulfur vapor", Eng. dizzy, Paeonian Dýalos "Dionysos", Lat. furere "to rage", belua "wild animal", Old Ir. dásacht "rage, fury", Lith. dvėsti "to croak, perish, die (animals)", dvelksmas "breath, waft, aura", Hitt. tuhhai "to gasp", Rus. dɨhánije "breath, waft", duh "spirit, soul, mind, aura, ghost, wind" also "aliveness, breathing, willingness, meaningfulness, truthfulness", dušá "spirit, soul; heart, kindness, truthfulness".
*rhinos or rhinon (ῥινόν)	Scholion to Odyssey 5.281: Οί δέ λέγουσιν Ἰλλυριούς ῥινόν λέγειν τήν άχλύν	"fog, mist"	PIE *h₁rinéHti	Old Alb. ren, mod. Alb. re, rê "cloud", singularized plural of *ri, which goes back to PAlb *rina, etymologically identical to the Illyrian form; also Alb. rij, rî 'to make humid'. Further connected to Gk. (Lesbian) orínein "to move", Old Ch. Slav. rinǫti "to flow", Skt. riṇá-ti "to pour, let flow".
sabaia, sabaium, *sabaius	Ammianus Marcellinus: Est autem sabaia ex ordeo vel frumento in liquorem conversus paupertinus in Illyrico potus Jerome: ζύθον, quod genus est potionis ex frugibus aquaque confectum et vulgo in Dalmatiae Pannoniaeque provinciis gentili barbaroque sermone appellatur sabaium	"a type of beer"	PIE *sap-	Eng. sap, Lat. sapere "to taste", Skt. sabar "sap, juice, nectar", Avestan višāpa "having poisonous juices", Arm ham, Gk. hapalós "tender, delicate", Old Ch. Slav. sveptŭ "bee's honey"; borrowed into Lat. and from there into Ital. zabaione "frothy drink".
*sibina (La. sibyna ~ sybina; Gr. σιβυνη ~ σιβυνης ~ συβινη ~ ζιβυνη)	Ennius (Annals, 5.540): Illyrii restant sicis sybinisque fodentes Festius compared it to συβηνη (Gk.), "flute case", a word found in Aristophanes' Thesmophoriazusai	"a hunting spear", generally, "a spear", "pike"		Alb. thupën/thupër "bar, stick" (Proto-Alb. *tsupina "stick"); Pers. zôpîn, Arm. səvīn "a spit".
sica (Lat. sica ~ sicca)	First mentioned in Ennius (Annals, 5.540): Illyrii restant sicis sybinisque fodentes Of Illyrian soldiers; later used in Pliny to describe Thracian implements	"curved knife, dagger"	PIE *ḱeh₁kʷeh₂	Alb. thika 'knife', which goes back to PAlb *tsika; Skt. śitá "sharp", Arm. sur "sharp", srem "to sharpen" Illyrian term borrowed into Lat. sica "dagger", the root of Lat. sicarii "assassins", Rus. siečiénije "cut, section; cross-section", siečj, rassiekatj "to whip, flog; to cut, shred, split, sever".

=== Messapic lemmas ===
Messapic language is oftentimes regarded as close to Illyrian even though there is still no consensus among scholars regarding their proximity. See Messapic lemmas for a list of Messapic words.

=== Toponyms, hydronyms, anthroponyms ===
Some words have been extracted from toponyms and anthroponyms.

Name	Notes	Proposed cognates	English meaning	PIE etymology	Related words
Balios (Βάλιος)	Name of one of Achilles's horses. Suspected to be of foreign origin (Thracian, Phrygian or Illyrian). Athanassakis supposes a loanword into Latin from Osco-Umbrian language badius/*balius, via an Illyrian source.	Alb. balë 'horse with white spot on forehead', Gk. phaliós 'having a white patch', Lith. balas/baltas 'white', OCS bĕlu 'white'	'dapple', 'related to a white color'	*bʰĕl-	
Bardylis (Βάρδυλις)	Illyrian king	Alb. i bardhë Messapic: bardulos	Alb. "white" Messapic: "grey"	*bʰreh₁ǵ-	
Dalmatae	Illyrian tribe	Alb. delmë, delë Orel rejects this analogy	"sheep"		Delminium (capital city of the Dalmatae, near Tomislavgrad) Dalmana (ancient city in N. Macedonia)
Dardani (Δαρδάνιοι, Δάρδανοι)	Tribe which lived in the historical region of Dardania in the central Balkans. Dardania is placed in a transitional onomastic region between southern Illyrian and Dalmatian with regional features. Connected to Albanian dardhë. It appears as a toponym in many Albanian-speaking regions: Dardhishte (Kaçanik), Dardhë (Korçë), Dardhas (Pogradec), Zall i Dardhës (Dibër), Darza (Ulcinj), Dardhatar (Zelenikovo), Dardhës (Molise), Dardhëza (Morea). Kruševo (from Proto-Slavic kruša, "pear") and other related toponyms have been proposed as South Slavic translations of Darda- toponyms.	Alb. dardhë	"pear"	*g'hord-, *dheregh-	Dardanoi in the area of ancient Troy Dardanelles Dardi in Daunia
Dassareti (Δασσαρῆται, Δασσαρήτιοι) - Sessarethes (Σεσαρήθιος)	Illyrian tribes with possibly related names.	Ep. Gr. daksa (δάξα)	"sea"		Affine to the Chaonian Greek Dexaroi
Deipatyros (Δειπάτυροϛ)	Deity of the Epirotic Stymphians, regarded as a name of Illyrian origin		"sky father"		Demeter
Dimallum - Dimale (Διμάλη)	Illyrian city on the border with Epirus	Alb. dy male	'two mountains'		
Enchelii (Ἐγχέλιοι/Ἐγχελεῖς)	Illyrian tribe	Alb. ngjalë	"eel"	*h₂engʷʰ-	
Rhizon (Ῥίζων), Risinium	Capital city of the Illyrian kingdom under the Ardiaei	Alb. rrjedh, rrjedhon 'flow, stream'	'flow, river, stream'	*(H)reǵ-	
Skárdon, Scardus (Σκάρδον)	Mountain range in Illyria	Alb. hardhë- 'lizard' < PAlb. *skard- 'digger', Greek (σ)κορδύλ- 'lizard, newt', Lith. skard-ús/-ýti 'steep / to dig', Latv. skārdît 'to split, crush'	'steep, to dig, cut, split'	*skord-, *(s)kerdʰ- or *(s)kerd-	Scardona, Scordisci
Taulantii (Ταυλάντιοι)	Illyrian tribe Living nearfter the Chelidones (meaning "swallow" in Greek, main reason for the connection with Alb. "dallëndyshe")	Alb. tallandyshe, dallëndyshe	"swallow"		Chelidones (Χελιδόνιοι)
Tergeste	Illyrian city	Alb. treg Română: târg	'marketplace'		Tergolape, Opitergium
Teuta(na) (Τεύτα)	Teuta is the diminutive of Teutana	Got. þiudans "king"	"people"	*teutéh₁-	
Ulcinium (Ουλκίνιον)	Illyrian city	Alb. ujk - ulk	"wolf"	*wĺ̥kʷos	Ulcisia castra
Vendum	Illyrian city	Alb. vend	'place, location'		

=== Non Illyrian words of possible Illyrian origin ===
Additionally to the words explicitly mentioned as Illyrian, scholars have extracted a list of non-Illyrian words that may have derived from Illyrian language.

Lemma	Source language	Notes	English meaning	PIE etymology	Proposed cognates
bagaron (βαγαρόν)	Laconian Greek	Hesychius: <βάγαρον>· χλιαρόν. Λάκωνες Defined as "Gk.-Illyr." by Pokorny.	"warm"	PIE *bʰōg-	Alb. bukë "bread", Phrygian bekos "bread", Eng. bake, Lat. focus "hearth", Old Ir. goba "blacksmith", Gk. phōgein "to roast", Armenian bosor "red", bots "flame", Rus. bagrovɨj, bagrianɨj "crimson, saturated red, color of dark blood, purpur", bagriéc, bagrianiec "redness of someone's face, cheeks, of heated up material (e.g. metal), crimson cloth, fabric".
brisa	Latin	Passed from Illyrian to Latin, ultimately of Thracian origin. Pokorny instead talks of a Messapic or Venetic origin of brisa.	"husk of grapes"		Alb. bërsí "lees, dregs; mash", Eng. broth, Lat. defrutum "new wine boiled down", Welsh brwd "brewage", Old Ir. bruth "heat, wrath", Thrac. brỹtos "barley alcohol", brỹtion "wine must", Gk. apéphrysen "to seethe, boil", ? Lith. bręsti "to mature, ripe", brendimas "ripening", also brinkti "to swell", brinkìmas "swelling" ?, Rus. braga, bražka "must, ale, unfinished or badly produced alcohol drink", broditj "to ferment (brew)", brožénije "fermentation (brewage)".
daksa -*dassa (δάξα)	Epirotic Greek	Hesychius: <δάξα>· θάλασσα. Ἠπειρῶται Regarded to be of Illyrian origin. May be connected to the Illyrian tribe of the Dassareti and the Chaonian Greek tribe of the Dexaroi (see table below)	"sea"		

=== Other lemmas ===
Other proposed lemmas are:

- Agruvium "along the coast between Risinum and Butua": IE *aĝr-; cf. Skt. ájraḥ "pasture, field", Lat. ager, Gk. agrós, Goth. akrs
- Bindus "river god"; Old Ir. banne "drop", Skt. bindú, vindú "drops, gob, spot", possibly Lat. fōns Bandusiae and Lusit. Bandua.
- Bosona "Bosna river", literally "running water": IE *bheg-, bhog- "to run"; Alb. dë-boj "to chase, to drive away", Rus. bĕg "running; (work)flow", Old Ch. Slav. bĕžati and Rus. bĕžatj "to flee, run; to work, to flow", Lith. bėgti "to flee, to run", Gk. phébesthai "to flee", phóbos "fear", Eng. beck "brook, stream", Middle Ir. búal "flowing water", Hindi bhāg "to flee"
- mons Bulsinus "Büžanim hill": IE *bʰl̥kos; cf. Eng. balk, Alb. bligë "forked piece of wood", Middle Ir. blog "piece, fragment", Lat. fulcrum "bedpost", Gk. phálanx "trunk, log", Lith. balžiena "crossbar", Serb. blazína "roof beam", Skt. bhuríjāu "cart arms"
- Derbanoí, Anderva: IE *derw; cf. Eng. tree, Alb. dru "wood", Old Ch. Slav. drĕvo "tree", Rus. dérevo "tree, wood", Welsh derw "oak", Gk. dóry "wood, spear", drýs "oak, tree", Lith. derva "pine wood", Hitt. taru "tree, wood', Thrac. taru "spear", Skt. dru "tree, wood", daru "wood, log"
- Dizēros, Andízētes: IE *digh; cf. Eng. dough, Gk. teîkhos "wall", Lat. fingere "to shape, mold", Old Ir. com-od-ding "he builds, erects", Old Rus. dĕža "kneading trough", Arm. dez "heap", Skt. dehah "body, form"
- Domator, personal name; cf. Old Ir. damnaid "he binds, breaks a horse", dam "ox", Eng. tame, dialectal Germ. zamer "ox not under the yoke", Alb. dem "young bull", Lat. domāre "to tame", domitor "tamer", Gk. dámnēmi "to break in", dámalos "calf", Skt. dāmyáti "he is tame; he tames", Rus. odomashnivat' "to tame"
- Loúgeon: Strabo in his Geography mentions "a marsh called Lougeon" (which has been identified as Lake Cerknica in Slovenia) by the locals (Illyrian and Celtic tribes), Lougeon being Strabo's rendition of the local toponym into Greek. cf. Alb. lag "to wet, soak, bathe, wash", lëgatë "pool", lug "trough, water-channel, spillway", Lith. liűgas "pool", Old Ch. Slav. & Rus. luža "pool", Rus. loža, lože, lógovo "rest place, lounge place, bed, den", Rus. ležátj "to lie, rest, lounge" and ložitj "to lay, put", Thrac. Lýginos, river name
- stagnus Morsianus "marshlands in Pannonia": IE *merĝ; cf. Middle High Germ. murc "rotten, withered, boggy", Old Ir. meirc "rust", Alb. marth "to shiver, shudder", Lith. markýti "to rust"
- Naro: IE *nor; cf. Alb. "hum-nerë" "abyss, chasm", Lith. nãras "diving duck; diver", Russ. norá "hole, burrow", Serbo-Croat. po-nor "abyss"
- Nedinum: IE *ned; cf. Skt. nadas "roarer"
- Oseriates "lakes": IE *h_{1}eĝʰero; cf. Serb-Croat. jȅzero, Rus. ózero, Lith. éžeras, Latvian ȩzȩrs, Gk. Achérōn "river in the underworld"
- Pelso (Latin authors referred to modern Lake Balaton as "lacus Pelso", Pelso being a hydronym from the local inhabitants), Pelso apparently meant "deep" or "shallow": IE *pels-; cf. Rus. ples (deep place in lake or river), North Alb. fellë (from fell "deep"), Czech pleso "deep place in a river, lake", Welsh bwlch "crack", Arm. pelem "to dig"
- Volcos, river name in Pannonia; cf. Old Ir. folc "heavy rain, wet weather", Welsh golchi "to wash", obsolete Eng. welkin "cloud", Old High Germ. welk "moist", German Wolke "cloud", Old Ch. Slav. and Rus. vlaga "moisture, plant juice", Volga, river name in Russia, ? vŭlgŭkŭ "wet", Latv. val̃gums "wetness", Alb. ulmej "to dampen, wet"

== Proposed Illyrian anthroponyms ==
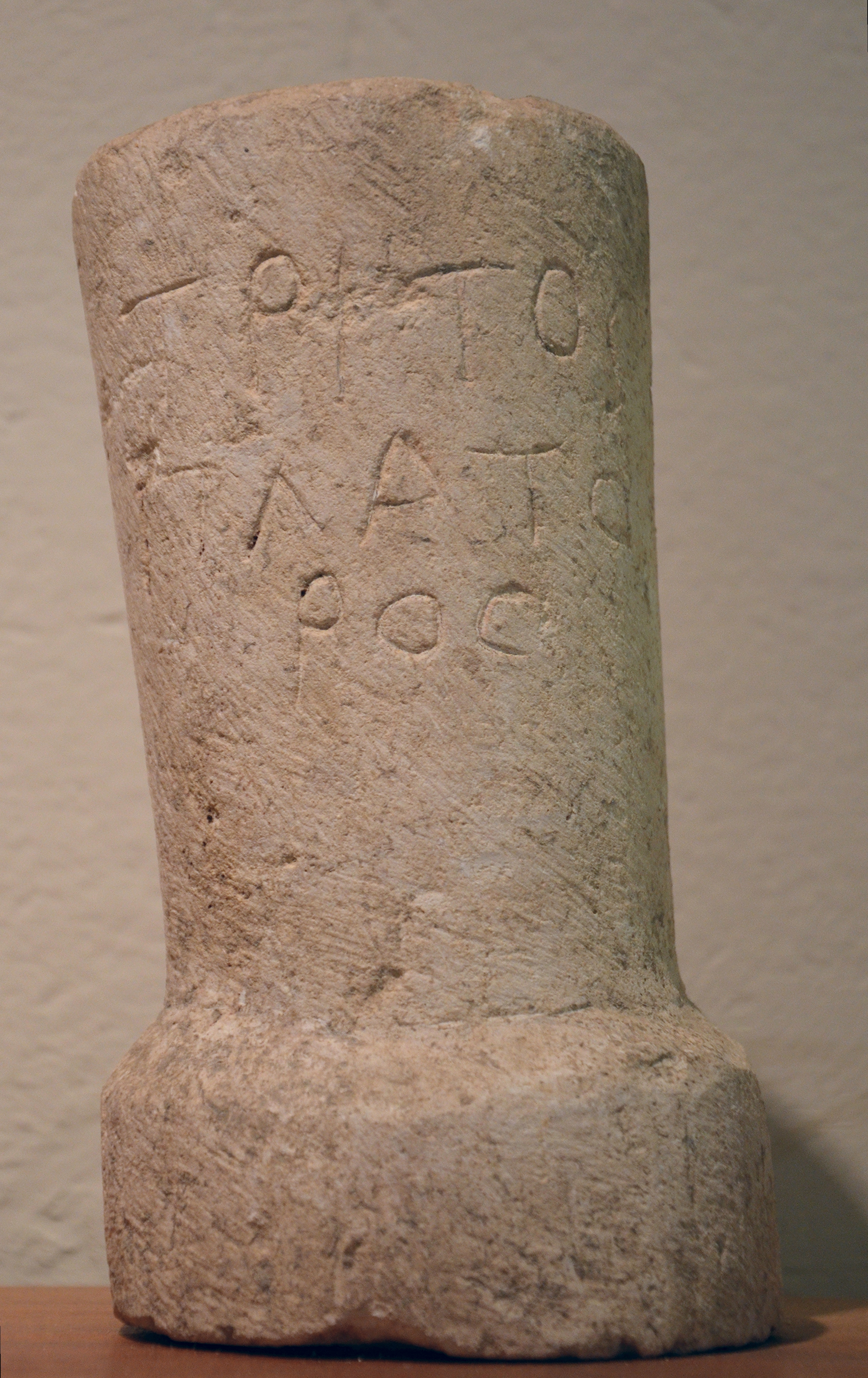
Greek inscription with Illyrian onomastics (name and patronymic) on a funerary stele, 2nd century BC, Apollonia, Albania.

The following anthroponyms derive from Illyrian or are not yet connected with another language unless noted, such as the Delmatae names of Liburnian origin. Alföldy identified five principal onomastic provinces within the Illyrian area: 1) the "real" Illyrians south of the river Neretva in Dalmatia and extending south to Epirus; 2) the Delmatae, who occupied the middle Adriatic coast between the "real Illyrians" to the south and the Liburni to the north; 3) the Liburni, a branch of Venetic in the northeast Adriatic; 4) the Iapodes, who dwelt north of the Delmatae and behind (inland from) the coastal Liburnians; 5) the Pannonians in the northern lands, and in Bosnia, northern Montenegro and Western Serbia. Katičić does not recognize a separate Pannonian onomastic area, and includes the Pannoni with the Delmatae. Below, names from four of Alföldy's five onomastic areas are listed, Liburnian excluded, having been identified as being akin to Venetic. A Dardanian area is also detailed.

=== South Illyrian ===
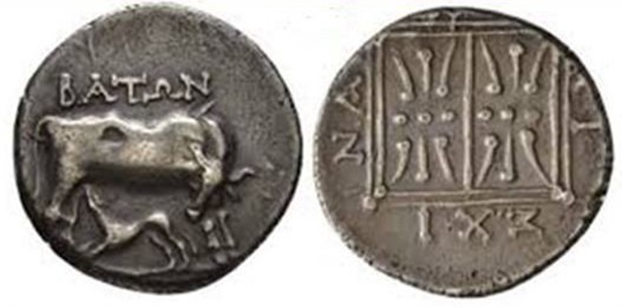
Coin from Apollonia bearing the inscription ΒΑΤΩΝ

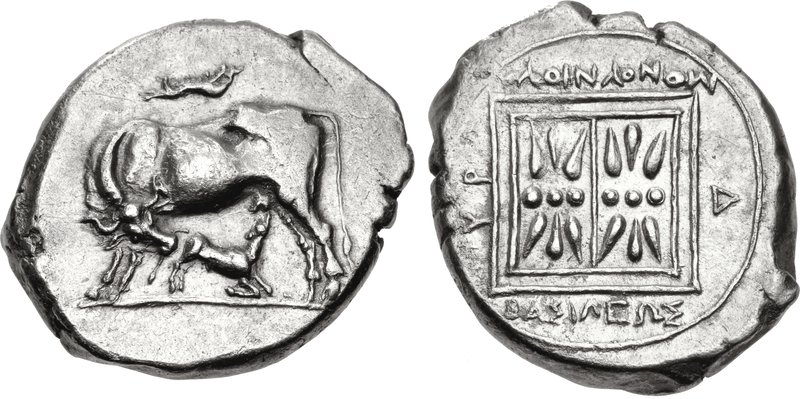
Coin from Dyrrhachion bearing the inscription ΒΑΣΙΛΕΩΣ ΜΟΝΟΥΝΙΟΥ

- Agirrus
- Agron
- Andena (f., attested at Dyrrhachium), Andes, Andis, Andio, Andia
- Annaeus/Annaius
- Antis (f.)
- Ballaios
- Bardyllis
- Bato, may derive from same root as Latin battuere, "to strike", or the root *bha, "say, tell".
- Birkenna
- Blodus, Bledis
- Boiken
- Boria, Bora
- Breigos
- Brykos
- Cleitus/Kleitos (from Greek)
- Daors
- Dasius
- Dazaios, Dazas, Dazos
- Ditus
- Epe(n)tinus (attested at Dyrrhachium; the name is adjectival, meaning "from Epetium", a town now known as Strobeč)
- Epicadus
- Epidius
- Genthena, Genthios, Gentius
- Glaukias (from Greek)
- Glavus
- Grabos
- Laiscus
- Madena
- Messor
- Monunius
- Mytilus
- Pinnes
- Pleuratus
- Pladomenus
- Plare(n)s
- Plator (in Liburnian as Plaetor; Venetic Plaetorius, cp. Latin Plaetorius)
- Posantio
- Pravaius
- Scerdis
- Skerdilaidas
- Tatta
- Temus, Temeia
- Teuda
- Teuta, Teutana means Queen in Illyrian.
- Tito, Titus (also the Illyrian name of the river Krka)
- Vendes
- Verzo
- Zanatis
- Ziraeus

=== Delmatae ===
Hundreds of Delmatae names have been recorded. Characteristic names include:

- Andena, Andes, Andis, Andio, Andia
- Aplis, Apludus, Aplus, Aplius
- Apurus
- Baezo
- Beusas, Beuzas
- Curbania
- Cursulavia
- Iato
- Lavincia
- Ledrus
- Messor
- Paio, Paiio
- Panes, Panias, Panius (or Pantus, inscription unclear), Panentius
- Pant(h)ia/Panto (f.)
- Pinsus
- Pladomenus
- Platino
- Samuntio
- Seio, Seiio
- Statanius, Staticus, Stato, Status
- Sestus, Sextus, Sexto
- Tito
- Tizius
- Tritus
- Var(r)o

Delmatae names in common with the Pannoni (some also occur among the south Illyrians):

- Bardurius
- Bato
- Carius
- Dasantilla
- Dasas, Dazas
- Dasto
- Plator, Platino
- Scenobarbus, Scenobardos (?)
- Verzo
- Verzulus

Some Delmatae names probably originate from the Liburnians. This conclusion is based on the Liburnian suffixes: -icus, -ica, -ocus, -ico; and from the distribution of the names among the Liburni/Veneti, and from their absence or scarcity in other onomastic areas:

- Acenica
- Clevata
- Darmocus
- Germanicus (the native Delmatae stem Germanus, Germus, with the Venetic/Liburnian -icus suffix)
- Labrico
- Lunnicus
- Melandrica
- Turus

From the southern Illyrians, the names Boria, Epicadus, Laedicalius, Loiscus, Pinnes and Tato and some others are present. From the Iapodes, Diteio and Ve(n)do, and a few names of Celtic origin (not shown here).

=== Pannoni ===
Some names attested among the Pannoni:

- Bato (also common among the Delmatae)
- Dasas, Dasius (also common among the Delmatae)
- Scenobarbus (also common among the Delmatae)
- Carvus
- Laidus
- Liccaius
- Plator
- Temans
- Tueta
- Varro
- Verzo

The following names are confined to the Pannonian onomastic province:

- Arbo
- Arsa (possibly Thracian)
- Callo
- Daetor
- Iauletis (genitive)
- Pirusta
- Proradus
- Scirto
- Vietis (genitive)

Northern Pannoni:

- Bato
- Breucus
- Dases
- Dasmenus
- Licco
- Liccaius

Names attested among the Colapiani, an Illyric tribe of Pannonia:

- Bato
- Cralus
- Liccaius
- Lirus
- Plassarus

Among the Jasi: Scenus. The Breuci: Scilus Bato (first and last name), Blaedarus, Dasmenus, Dasius, Surco, Sassaius, Liccaius, Lensus. The Amantini, the Scordisci: Terco, Precio, Dases, Dasmenus.

=== Messapic ===
- Dasius, Latin form of a Messapic name from southern Italy.

=== Illyrian theonyms ===
The following names of gods (theonyms) derive from possibly several languages (Liburnian, Illyrian, etc.) and are names of gods worshipped by the Illyrians. However, they are known through Interpretatio romana and their names may have been corrupted.

- Anzotica (or Ansotica)
- Armatus
- Bindus
- Boria
- Eia
- Ica
- Iria
- Latra
- Malesocus
- Medaurus
- Sentona
- Thana
- Vidasus

== External influences ==
The Ancient Greek language would have become an important external influence on Illyrian-speakers who occupied lands adjacent to ancient Greek colonies, mainly on the Adriatic coast. The Taulantii around Epidamnos and the Bylliones experienced a certain degree of bilingualism. Invading Celts who settled on lands occupied by Illyrians brought the Illyrians into contact with the Celtic languages and some tribes were Celticized especially those in Dalmatia and the Pannoni. Intensive contact may have happened in what is now Bosnia, Croatia, and Serbia. Due to this intensive contact, and because of conflicting classical sources, it is unclear whether some ancient tribes were Illyrian or Celtic (ex: Scordisci) or mixed in varying degree. Thracians and Paeonians also occupied lands populated by Illyrians, bringing Illyrians into contact with the Thracian language and Paeonian language. Certainly, no serious linguistic study of Illyrian language could be made without the inclusion of Latin, in addition to ancient Greek, Thracian and Celtic languages, as the peoples that spoke those languages were recorded by both ancient and modern historians to have lived in lands inhabited by Illyrians at one period of time in history or another. Last, but certainly not least, any comprehensive study of Illyrian language must take into account the Indo-European glossary.

=== Celtic ===
The following Illyrian names derive from Celtic:

- Aioia
- Ammida (questionable)
- Andetia
- Argurianus (Thracian or Celtic)
- Arvus
- Baeta
- Belzeius
- Bidna
- Boio
- Bricussa
- Cambrius
- Catta
- Dussona
- Enena
- Iaca
- Iacus
- Iaritus
- Kabaletus
- Lautus
- Litus
- Madusa
- Madussa
- Mallaius
- Mascelio
- Matera (questionable)
- Matisa
- Mellito (Greek and Celtic)
- Nantanius
- Nantia
- Nindia
- Nonntio
- Pinenta (possible)
- Poia
- Sarnus
- Seius
- Seneca (questionable)
- Sicu
- Sinus
- Sisimbrius
- Totia
- Vepus

=== Thracian ===
The following names derive from Thracian:

- Argurianus (Thracian or Celtic)
- Auluporis
- Auluzon
- Bessus
- Bithus
- Celsinus
- Celsus
- Cocaius
- Daizo
- Delus
- Dida
- Dinentilla
- Dizas
- Dizo
- Dolens
- Eptaikenthos
- Ettela
- Mania
- Moca
- Murco
- Mucatralis
- Mucatus
- Teres
- Torcula
- Tzitzis

=== Greek ===
The following names may derive from Greek:

- Ardiaioi, the ancient Greek name for Ardiaei (ardis, 'head of the arrow, sting'). One challenge to this theory is that the suggested root-word ardis does not necessarily form 'Ardiaioi', by the rules of Greek language
- Ceraunii, tribal exonym, ("Κεραύνιοι, "Thunderbolt-men)"
- Cleitus, ("κλειτός", "renowned man")
- Glaukias, ("γλαυκός", "gleaming man")
- Mellito, Greek and Celtic element, gr. μελλιτόεις, "like honey"
- Plator, gr. Πλάτων, "wide man"
- Pleuratus, gr. πλευρά, "side'"

=== Latin ===
The following names may derive from Latin:

- Ardiaei, (ardea, 'heron'). However, the problem with the theory supporting the Latin etymology for the Ardiaei is that Ardiaioi, a Greek form of Ardiaei is found in several pre-Roman sources, and it turns that it precedes the Roman/Latin Influence, as it precedes the Vardaei, another form of this name. Greek historian Strabo says in paragraph 6 (Book 7, chapter 5) of his Geographica: “The Ardiaei were called by the men of later times "Vardiaei".

== Bibliography ==
- Best, Jan G. P.; de Vries, Nanny M. W.; Henri Frankfort Foundation (1982). Interaction and Acculturation in the Mediterranean: Proceedings of the Second International Congress of Mediterranean Pre- and Protohistory, Amsterdam, 19–23 November 1980. John Benjamins Publishing Company. ISBN 90-6032-195-2.
- Bunson, Matthew (1995). A Dictionary of the Roman Empire. Oxford University Press US. ISBN 0-19-510233-9.
- Cicero, Marcus Tullius; Dyck, Andrew Roy (2008). Catilinarians. Cambridge University Press. ISBN 978-0-521-83286-1.
- Davison, David; Gaffney, Vincent L.; Wilkes, John J.; Marin, Emilio (2006). Dalmatia: Research in the Roman province 1970-2001: Papers in Honour of J.J. Wilkes. Archaeopress. ISBN 1-84171-790-8.
- Hamp, Eric Pratt; Ismajli, Rexhep (2007). Comparative Studies on Albanian. Akademia e Shkencave dhe e Arteve e Kosovës. ISBN 978-9951-413-62-6.
- Hornblower, Simón; Spawforth, Antony (2003). The Oxford Classical Dictionary. Oxford University Press. ISBN 0-19-860641-9.
- Katičić, Radoslav (1965). "Zur Frage der keltischen und pannonischen Namengebiete im römischen Dalmatien". Godisnjak (Annuaire). 3. Sarajevo: Centar za balkanološke studije: 53–76.
- Krahe, Hans (1955). Die Sprache der Illyrier. Erster Teil: Die Quellen. Wiesbaden: Otto Harrassowitz.
- Lewis, D. M.; Boardman, John (1994). The Cambridge Ancient History (Volume 6): The Fourth Century B.C. Cambridge University Press. ISBN 0-521-23348-8.
- Ó hÓgáin, Dáithí (2003). The Celts: A History. Woodbridge: Boydell Press. ISBN 0-85115-923-0.
- Orel, Vladimir (1998). Albanian Etymological Dictionary. Brill. ISBN 978-90-04-11024-3.
- Pomeroy, Sarah B.; Burstein, Stanley M.; Donlan, Walter; Roberts, Jennifer Tolbert (2008). A Brief History of Ancient Greece: Politics, Society, and Culture. Oxford University Press. ISBN 978-0-19-537235-9.
- Savić, Danilo; Ligorio, Orsat (2022). "Illyrian and Slavic". Lucida Intervalla. 51. Beograd: Filozofski fakultet Univerziteta u Beogradu: 3–41. ISSN 1450-6645.
- Wilkes, John J. (1995). The Illyrians. Oxford: Blackwell Publishing. ISBN 0-631-19807-5.
- Williams, Craig Arthur (2004). Epigrams: Martial. Oxford University Press US. ISBN 0-19-515531-9.
