= Andis =

Andis and its variants Andio, Andes, etc., was a personal name popular among the Illyrians of Dardania, Pannonia, and Dalmatia. The god Andinus – considered to have been the Dardanian indigenous deity of vegetation and soil fertility – is also attested in votive inscriptions from the Roman province of Moesia Superior. The personal names are considered to be derived from the name of the Dardanian god.

Due to a widespread distribution of personal names like Andio, Andis, etc., and female versions Andia, Andena, etc., as well as the theonym Andinus, which are found throughout the territory inhabited by Illyrians, a presumable root word would be *and-. The name may also be connected to the root of the tribal name Andizetes, a small Illyrian community of Pannonia.

== Bibliography ==
- Mócsy, András (2014) [1974]. Pannonia and Upper Moesia: A History of the Middle Danube Provinces of the Roman Empire. Routledge. ISBN 9781317754251.
- Wilkes, John J. (1996) [1992]. The Illyrians. Oxford, United Kingdom: Blackwell Publishers Limited. ISBN 0-631-19807-5.
- Zeqo, Moikom (2016). "Zef Mirdita, dijetari i madh shqiptar i formatit evropian". Studime Albanologjike. 13. Instituti i Trashëgimisë Shpirtërore e Kulturore të Shqiptarëve – Shkup: 13–20. ISSN 1857-6958.
