= Cletis =

Cletis may refer to:

- Cletis Carr (born 1959), U.S. musician
- Cletis Gordon (born 1983), former American football player

== See also ==
- Who Is Cletis Tout?, 2001 American-Canadian action comedy film
- Cletus (disambiguation)
- Cleitus (disambiguation)
