= Cletus =

Cletus or Cleatus is a given name (Ancient Greek Κλητος or Klētos), meaning "one who has been called" or "summoned one". It may refer to:

== People ==
=== Religion ===
- Pope Anacletus (died c. 92), third Bishop of Rome, also known as Cletus
- Cletus Bél (died 1245), Hungarian prelate

=== Politics ===
- Cletus Avoka (born 1951), Ghanaian lawyer and politician
- Cletus Seidu Dapilah (born 1980), Ghanaian politician
- Cletus Dunn (born 1948), Canadian politician
- Cletus Wotorson (1937–2024), Liberian politician and geologist

=== Sports ===
- Cletus Andersson (1893–1971), Swedish water polo player
- Clete Blakeman (born 1964), American football official
- Clete Boyer (1937–2007), American baseball player
- Cletus Clark (born 1962), American retired hurdler
- Cletus Paul (born 1993), Indian footballer
- Cletus Seldin (born 1986), American boxer

=== Other fields ===
- Cletus Ibeto (born 1952), Nigerian businessman
- Cletus P. Kurtzman (1938–2017), American mycologist
- Cletus Mendis (born 1949), Sri Lankan actor

== Fictional characters ==
- Cletus Hogg, a deputy in the TV show The Dukes of Hazzard
- Cletus Kasady, a Marvel Comics supervillain, also known as Carnage
- Cletus Klump, in The Nutty Professor and its sequel
- Cledus Snow, in Smokey and the Bandit
- Cletus Spuckler, in The Simpsons
- Cleatus, a minor character on Good Times
- Cletus, a recurring character in Helluva Boss
- Cletus, in the Deponia video game series
- Cletus Ewing, in the video game Grand Theft Auto V
- Cletus, a police dog in the series Resident Alien

== Other uses ==
- Cletus (bug), a genus of true bugs in the family Coreidae
- Cleatus the Robot, the robot mascot of Fox NFL Sunday and all of Fox Sports
- "Cletus Awreetus-Awrightus", an instrumental song from the 1972 Frank Zappa album The Grand Wazoo

== See also ==
- Cleitus (disambiguation)
- Cletis (disambiguation)
