= Kruševo, Stolac =

Kruševo
- Village
- Location within Bosnia and Herzegovina
- Coordinates: 43.0639535°N 17.8735471°E
- Country: Bosnia and Herzegovina
- Entity: Federation of Bosnia and Herzegovina
- Canton: Herzegovina-Neretva
- Municipality: Stolac

Area
  - Total: 12.27 sq mi (31.79 km^{2})

Population (2013)
  - Total: 241
  - Density: 19.6/sq mi (7.58/km^{2})
- Time zone: UTC+1 (CET)
  - Summer (DST): UTC+2 (CEST)

Kruševo is a village in the municipality of Stolac, Bosnia and Herzegovina.

== Demographics ==
According to the 2013 census, its population was 241.

Ethnicity in 2013
Ethnicity	Number	Percentage
Croats	227	94.2%
Bosniaks	14	5.8%
Total	241	100%
