= Kruševo, Gusinje =

Kruševo Krusheva
- Village
- Location within Montenegro
- Coordinates: 42.562311°N 19.865105°E
- Country: Montenegro
- Region: Northern
- Municipality: Gusinje

Population (2011)
  - Total: 335
- Time zone: UTC+1 (CET)
  - Summer (DST): UTC+2 (CEST)

Kruševo (Montenegrin Cyrillic: Крушево) (Albanian : Krusheva) is a village in the municipality of Gusinje, Montenegro.

== Demographics ==
According to the 2011 census, its population was 335.

Ethnicity in 2011
Ethnicity	Number	Percentage
Bosniaks	179	53.4%
Albanians	144	43.0%
other/undeclared	12	3.6%
Total	335	100%
