= Kruševo, Olovo =

Village in Olovo, Bosnia and Herzegovina

Kruševo
- Village
- Location within Bosnia and Herzegovina
- Coordinates: 44.0822147°N 18.5999154°E
- Country: Bosnia and Herzegovina
- Entity: Republika Srpska; Federation of Bosnia and Herzegovina
- Region Canton: Sarajevo; Zenica-Doboj
- Municipality: Sokolac; Olovo

Area
  - Total: 4.24 sq mi (10.97 km^{2})

Population (2013)
  - Total: 168
  - Density: 39.7/sq mi (15.3/km^{2})
- Time zone: UTC+1 (CET)
  - Summer (DST): UTC+2 (CEST)

Kruševo is a village in the municipalities of Sokolac (Republika Srpska) and Olovo, Bosnia and Herzegovina.

== Demographics ==
According to the 2013 census, its population was 168, all living in the Olovo part thus none living in the Sokolac part.

Ethnicity in 2013
Ethnicity	Number	Percentage
Bosniaks	166	98.8%
other/undeclared	2	1.2%
Total	168	100%
