= Cleitus =

Cleitus, Clitus or Kleitos (Greek: Κλείτος) may refer to:

== People with the name ==
- Cleitus the Black (c. 375–328 BC), Macedonian officer and friend of Alexander the Great, killed by the latter after an argument
- Cleitus the White (died 318 BC), Macedonian officer who rose to prominence after Alexander the Great's death
- Cleitus (Dardania) (fl. 335–295 BC), Illyrian king
- Kleitos Kyrou, (1921–2006), Greek poet and translator

== Other uses ==
- Cleitus (mythology), multiple figures in Greek mythology
- Kleitos, Kozani, a village in the Kozani municipality, Greece

== See also ==
- Cletis (disambiguation)
- Cletus (disambiguation)
