= Dardanus (son of Illyrius) =

Character from Greek mythology

Dardanus (Ancient Greek: Δάρδανος) was a character in Greek mythology. He was one of the sons of Illyrius, and the eponymous founder of the Dardani.

== Family ==
Dardanus was the son of Illyrius, who was the son of either Cadmus and Harmonia or Polyphemus and Galatea. He had five brothers: Enchelus, founder of the Enchelei; Autarieus, founder of the Autariatae; Maedus; Taulas, founder of the Taulantii; and Perrhaebus, founder of the Perrhaebi. He also had three sisters: Partho, founder of the Parthini; Daortho, founder of the Daorsi; and Dassaro, founder of the Dassaretii.

== In mythology ==
According to Appianus of Alexandria, Dardanus was the founder of the Dardani, an ancient Illyrian tribe which inhabited much of modern-day Kosovo, together with land in what is now Serbia.

== Sources ==
- Çobani, Tonin (2017). Mitologji SERBOS [Serbian mythology]. Beograd: Albas. ISBN 978-1389-02-982-9.
