= Scipione di Manzano =

Italian poet

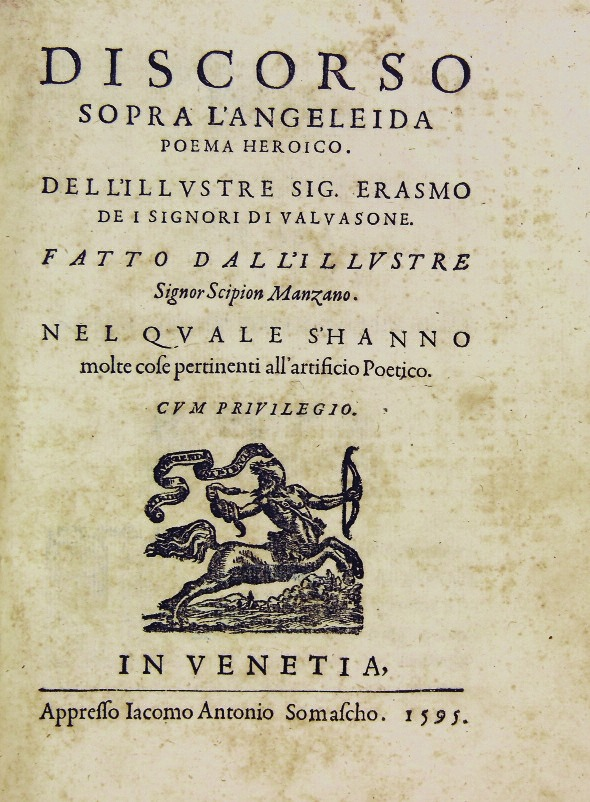
Discorso sopra l'Angeleida, Venice, 1595

Scipione di Manzano or Scipione Manzano (14 November 1560 – 26 February 1596) was an Italian poet.

== Biography ==
He was born in Cividale del Friuli, to a local aristocratic family. He developed an interest in literature from studies in his hometown, but later in Venice. In 1594, inspired by Torquato Tasso's work, he published an epic poem about Doge Enrico Dandolo's Sack of Constantinople in 1202. His best known work, published posthumously, is an epic poem Aci: favola marina, about the love story between Acis and the nymph Galatea.
