= Ciara Considine =

British musician known for her Celtic and folk music

- Born: Maidstone, Kent, England
- Genres: Celtic, world, folk
- Occupation: Musician
- Instrument(s): Piano, voice, flute, Irish flute, harp, Celtic lyre, tin whistle
- Website: ciaracelticmusic.com

Ciara Considine is a musician known for her Celtic and folk music. She has toured throughout the world playing flute and piano, as well as other instruments, and singing.

Ciara Considine started singing with her older siblings, when she was a young child. Her parents were Irish immigrants living in the UK. She learned to play the flute and piano. Eventually, she joined the National Youth Choir of Great Britain. Later, she studied piano at the Royal Northern College of Music. She obtained a bachelor's degree, as well as a master's degree and a postgraduate diploma in music performance. Ciara also tutors instrumentalists.

Her music has been featured on the Irish and Celtic Music Podcast, hosted by Marc Gunn.

Ciara Considine has released two albums.

== Albums ==
- Ó Mo Chroí (2008)
- Beyond The Waves (2010)
