= Ancient Celtic music =

Music of the ancient Celts

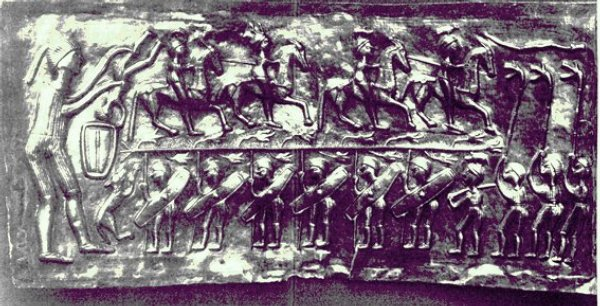
Carnyx players (bottom right) on a panel from the Gundestrup Cauldron

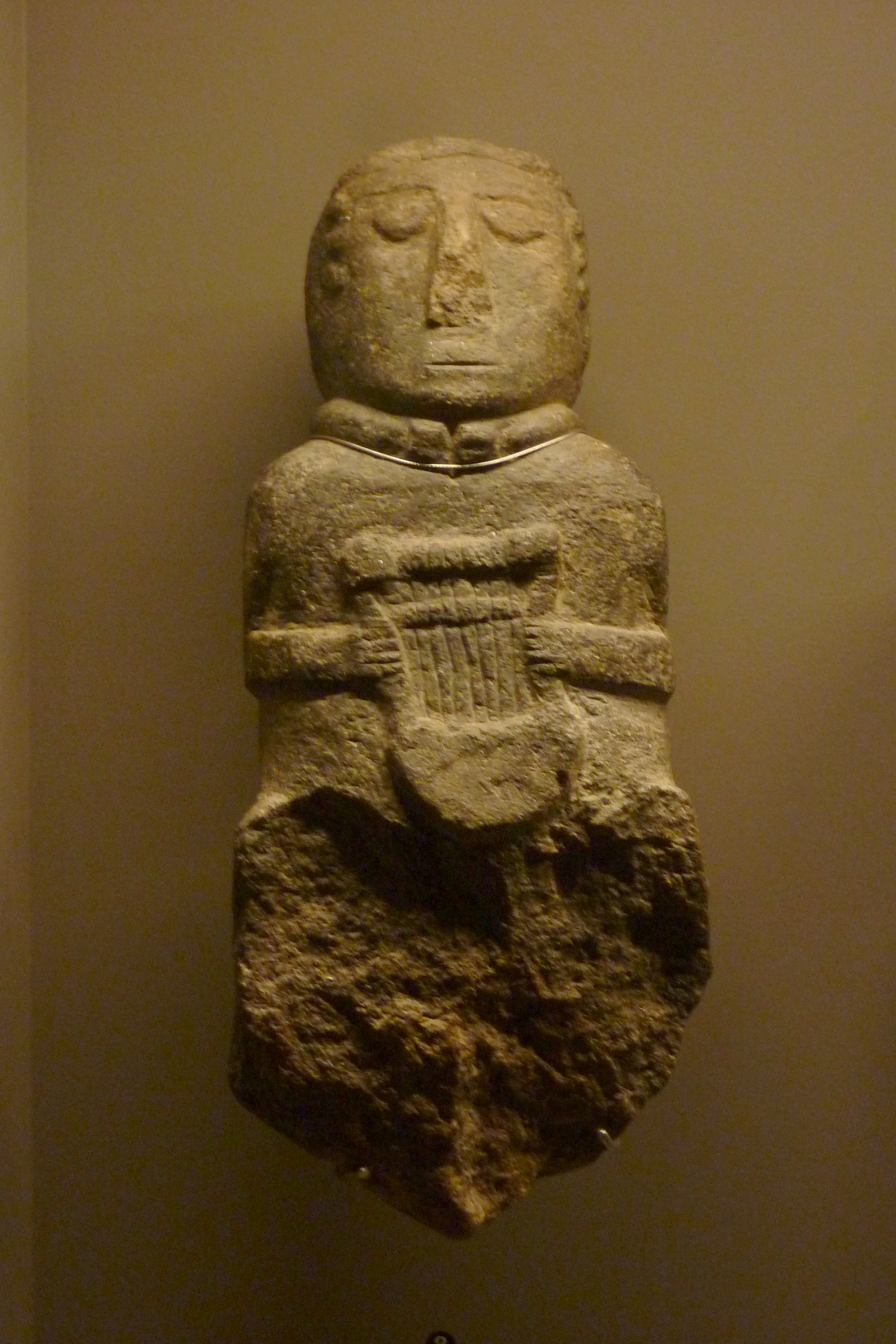
Sculpture depicting a bard with a lyre (Brittany, 2nd century BC)

Deductions about the music of the ancient Celts of the La Tène period and their Gallo-Roman and Romano-British descendants of Late Antiquity rely primarily on Greek and Roman sources, as well as on archaeological finds and interpretations including the reconstruction of the Celts' ancient instruments. Most of the textual information centers on military conflicts and on maybe the most prominent Celtic instrument of its time, the carnyx.

== The Celts and Greco-Roman music ==
In 54 BC Cicero wrote that he "did not fancy" there were any musically educated people on the British isle. Independent of the validity of Cicero's remark, the situation was different for the Gallic regions. By the time of Augustus, musical education had widely gained ground in Gaul, as Iulius Sacrovir used the erudite Gauls as a decoy, after Sacrovir and Iulius Florus had occupied the city of Augustodonum during the Gallic insurrection in 21 AD. The Gauls took great pride in their musical culture, which is shown by the remark of Gaius Iulius Vindex, the Gallic rebel and later senator under Claudius, who shortly before the arrival in Rome called emperor Nero a malus citharodeus ("bad cithara player") and reproached him with inscitia […] artis ("ignorance of the arts"). However, Celtic music culture was spread inhomogeneously over Europe: Maximinus Thrax, the Thracian-Roman emperor of Gothic descent, annoyed his fellow Romans because he was unable to appreciate a mimic stage song.

== The Carnyx ==
The carnyx (plural: carnyces; Greek: κάρνυξ—"karnyx"—or rarely: καρνον—"karnon") was a Celtic-Dacian variant of the Etruscan-Roman lituus and belongs to the family of brass instruments. It was an ſ-shaped valveless horn made of beaten bronze and consisted of a tube between one and two meters long, whereas the diameter of the tube is unknown. Archaeological finds date back to the Bronze Age, and the instrument itself is attested for in contemporary sources between ca. 300 BC and 200 AD. The carnyx was in widespread use in Britain, France, parts of Germany, eastward to Romania and beyond, even as far as India, where bands of Celtic mercenaries took it on their travels.

Gallic coins show the carnyx behind the head of the goddess Gallia or held by a chieftain, a charioteer or a Gallic Victoria. On British coins the instrument is seen swung by mounted Celtic warriors or chiefs. Roman coins, e.g. those heralding Caesar's victory over Gaul, depict the carnyx on Roman Tropaion as spoils of war. Other depictions are known from the Augustus statue of Prima Porta. In addition several instruments are illustrated on Trajan's Column, carried by Dacian warriors. The carnyx's most prominent feature is the bell, which was constructed as an animal head, either as one of a serpent, a fish, a bird, a wolf, a horse, an ass or a wild boar. The earliest depiction shows the head of a dragon and was found on Aetolian victory coins from the 3rd century BC, which commemorate the expulsion of the Gallic warriors, who had marauded the Delphi sanctum. Behn (1912) interpreted the many bell types as distinguishing features of the various Celtic clans and chiefdoms. Others have suggested a mythological component, which is the most logical explanation, since the Deskford Carnyx in Scotland was a sacrificial offering, of which the possibly dismantled head could have been the key element. Based on this independent development of the bell an attempt was made to derive the Etruscan lituus from the carnyx, but without success.

=== Playing techniques and features ===
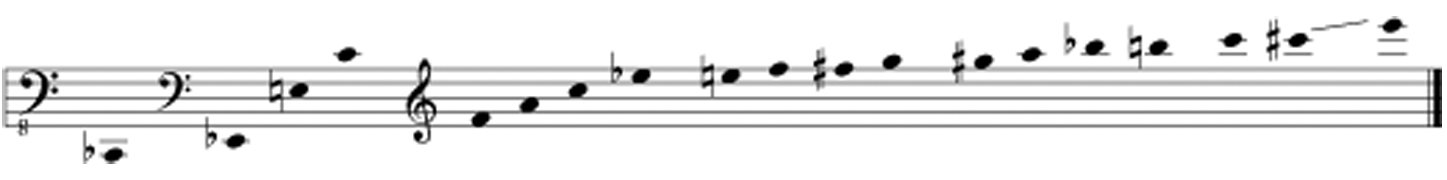
Pitch compass of the reconstructed Deskford carnyx

The sound of the carnyx was described as lugubrious and harsh, perhaps due to the loosened tongue of the bell, which shows that the instrument must have been a discrete enhancement of the Etruscan lituus, the sound of which was mostly described as bright and piercing. The carnyx was held vertically so that the sound would travel from more than three meters above the ground. Reconstructions have shown that the instrument's embouchure must have been cut diagonally as an oval opening, so the carnyx could be played in a similar fashion as a modern-day trumpet, i.e. with vibrating lips, however blown from the side. Due to the absence of valves and crooks, melodies were created by producing harmonics with overblowing techniques, as the reconstructional work by John Kenny has convincingly shown (see External links for a recording sample). The fairly wide bell guaranteed a very high playing volume, and the instrument itself must have had a considerable dynamic range. The best surviving bell of a carnyx was found in North East Scotland as part of the so-called Deskford Carnyx and featured a movable tongue. In addition the bronze jaw of the animal head may have been loosened as well in order to produce a jarring sound that would surely have been most dreadful when combined with the sound of a few dozen more carnyces in battle. The demoralizing effect of the Gallic battle music must have been enormous: When the Celts advanced on Delphi under Brennus in 279 BC, the unusual echoing effects of the blaring horns completely overawed the Greeks, before even a single fight could commence.

=== Use of the carnyx ===
Since most ancient Roman sources are based on bellicose encounters with the Celtic chiefdoms, the carnyx is today mostly seen as an instrument used during warfare, as Polybius e.g. reports for the battle of Telemon, Gallia Cisalpina, in 225 BC, where the Gauls used the instrument together with other brass instruments to frighten the Roman enemy. The limitation to acoustic or psychological warfare is however erroneous. Brass instruments were regularly used as a means of communication during battle, relaying orders for troop positioning, movement and tactics, also by the Gauls. Other sources confirm that the Gauls kept their military order even in situations of military mishaps. The musicians of their army camps played their horns to ensure a cohesive and controlled retreat. After the victory of Marius near Vercellae, his Roman rival Catulus Caesar reserved a Cimbrian signaling horn from the loot for himself. Music, musicians and instruments were strategically important elements for the Roman and Celtic armies alike.

Furthermore, the instrument can be seen in action on the famous Gundestrup cauldron in the depiction of a warrior initiation ritual (2nd or 1st century BC), a clear evidence for the use of the instrument outside of the purely military realm. The ritual use of the instrument is further supported by the Deskford Carnyx, which was shown to have been a sacrificial offering to an unknown god.

=== Archaeological finds ===
Apart from the Scottish Deskford Carnyx found in 1816 on the shores of Moray Firth in Aberdeenshire, fragments of only four other carnyces had been found (e.g. the Glanum Carnyx in the Bouches-du-Rhône region), until in 2004 archaeologists discovered a foundation deposit of five well preserved carnyces from the first or second century AD under a Gallo-Roman fanum at Tintignac (Corrèze, France), four of which feature boar heads, while the fifth exemplar appears to have a serpent bell. The fact that the carnyces were deposited on a holy site underlines the sacrificial importance of the instrument in Gallic culture. The archaeologists responsible for the Tintignac excavation assume that the carnyces were offered to a deity identified with the Roman god Mars. There is still debate on the dating, because parts of other finds discovered in the deposit seem to be older than the first century, possibly dating to the first century BC, which means that some of the musical instruments may have been stored inside the sanctuary long before being buried.

== Other Celtic instruments ==
=== Brass instruments ===
In his accounts of the battle of Telemon, Polybius clearly distinguishes between horn- and trumpet-like instruments played by the Gallic warriors. In general the Celtic peoples had a variety of instruments at their disposal. Aside from the carnyx, at least two other brass instrument types are known from Roman and Greek depictions.

==== The Celtic horn ====
The Celtic horn was a large, oval-curved horn with a thin tube and a modestly large bell, not unlike the Roman cornu, especially since it also had a crossbar as a means of supporting the instrument's weight on the player's shoulder. Like the carnyx it is therefore and in all probability an instrument of Etruscan origin from the first period of hellenization. On a Pompeian fresco, the horn is carried by a female dancer, and a Gallic warrior carries a broken exemplar, fastened together by a (leather?) band, on a Capitoline sculpture. Like the Roman cornu, the Celtic horn will have been held horizontally to ensure a more comfortable playing position.

==== The Celtic trumpet ====
The Celtic trumpet was similar to the straight Roman tuba and probably came in different lengths. A Celtic musician is depicted playing the instrument on a late Greek vase. A related instrument could be the early mediaeval Loch Erne horn that was found in Ireland.

==== Other brass instruments ====
Many regional variants of the Celtic horns are known and came in different shapes, sizes and diameters, like the Loughnashade Trumpa from Ireland and similar horns from Scandinavia and other regions. Couissin (1927) documented a third Celtic wind instrument type with a bent horn, similar to the Caledonian Caprington Horn or the infamous prehistoric Sussex horn that was however lost and of which only drawings and reproductions survive. It is not known whether the horn mentioned by Couissin was a fragment of another Celtic horn or a simple cow horn of the rural population, a bowed horn-instrument known all across Europe.

=== Woodwinds and similar instruments ===
Bone flutes, mostly made from birds, are known since the Stone Age. Wooden flutes were introduced later and corresponded to the Roman fistula (shepherd's flute). But terracotta and bone whistles remained in use throughout antiquity. In addition woodwinds made of tubes and pipes, similar to the Greek syrinx (pan flute), were in use.

=== Percussion and dance ===
Crotales (hand bells) made of bronze or wood as well as terracotta rattles are known since the Bronze Age, some of which came in the shape of birds. Closed bells were sometimes built with a ring and could be strapped to the player's apparel. Weapons and shields—apart from their use for rhythmic noises on the battlefields—must have been widely adopted as percussion instruments, but the only sources in this respect are on the Gallaecian and Celtiberian culture: In his epic on the second Punic war Silius mentions the exotic songs of the Gallaecian military allies, to which they beat the rhythm on their shields. Celtiberian weapon dances are reported for the funeral of Tiberius Sempronius Gracchus. The most famous dances of Hispania however were performed by the Gaditanae, the women of Gades in Hispania Baetica, which were so popular in Rome that special teachers from Spain were hired for Roman music education. The dancers used hand clappers as an accompanying instrument, creating a lascivious dance similar to modern-day castanet performances. If the Celts used drumming instruments like the Roman tympanum is unknown, but very likely, because other forms of hand drums like the ceramic German Honsommern Drum, which was similar to the African djembe, are known since the Neolithic. A later Iron Age drum is the Malemort Drum found in the central French Corrèze region.

=== Celtic use of Roman instruments ===
Since many Celts like the Gauls and Germans became part of the Roman army, they must have also used Roman instruments, especially during battle. However, only one source seems to have been passed down: At the time of emperor Claudius' inauguration, the troops stationed in Germania and Pannonia mutinied. When an unexpected lunar eclipse commenced, the insurgent Pannonians feared the wrath of the gods and ordered their musicians to play against their perdition aeris sono, tubarum cornuumque concentu, i.e. with their tubae and cornua.

== Chant ==
The Romans have left a variety of sources on chants from various regions. Sallust mentions the Spanish custom of ancestral songs honoring their military deeds. The recital of "barbaric songs" is reported for a member of the Celtiberian infantry during the battle of Cannae in 216 BC, as he was attacked by the Roman consul. National songs are already attested by Tacitus for the Caledonians. Livius reports Gallic war songs that were heard at the river Allia. After the Gallic victory (ca. 387 BC) the city's inhabitants had to endure the dissonant battle chants. A sole Gallic warrior is reported to have gone into a fight singing. Livius on the other hand only describes the Roman Titus Manlius, who would defeat him in 361 BC, as remaining in defiant silence to concentrate all his anger on the impending fight. In 218 BC the Gauls resisted the enemy commander Hannibal and his troops during his crossing of the Rhône with furious battle cries and the demonstrative clashing of their swords and armor.

Since many of the Gauls and Germans joined Caesar's army after his victory over Gaul, their war chants were added to the Roman oeuvre of army songs: When 2000 soldiers from the Gallic cavalry defected to Octavian before the battle of Actium, they didn't only cheer for Caesar but presented genuine Gallic war songs. Probably the most popular vocal performers were the Celtic bards, whose national heroic songs were known in Rome throughout antiquity.

=== Germanic chants ===
The Roman sources on Germanic chants are not based on ethnographical topica, but originate from actual experiences. The primary attributes of Germanic singing can be derived from the accounts on the Germanic tribes by Publius Cornelius Tacitus. As scant and recapitulatory Tacitus' observations might be, it is possible to deduce two discrete music genres: the war chant (barditus/barritus/baritus), and the heroic songs.

==== Barditus — the battle song ====
According to Tacitus, among other heroes and gods, the Germans especially worshipped Heracles as their god of war with their battle songs, which may have inspired Hecataeus of Miletus to use the name Κελτοί (Keltoi) for the Celtic Hallstatt tribes of Western and South-Western Germany, since Celtus was the son of Heracles and Keltine in Greek mythology. The warriors "sung under their shields" and inferred the outcome of the battle from the character of the so-called barditus and also accompanied their cries with the beating and rattling of their weapons and armour. The most important aspect was namely the intonation before the battle, and the abrupt start of the barditi doesn't speak for music with words. The characterization as an acoustic crescendo rather points at noisy battle clamor than a normal song with lyrics.

The Germans fighting for Aulus Vitellius Germanicus went into battle singing, after they had been surround by Othonian enemy forces. In his account of the Batavian rebellion led by Gaius Iulius Civilis the author Tacitus contrasts the hesitant attitude of the Roman soldiers with the sullen Batavian chants. The writings of Ammianus specify that the descriptions of the raw, dull and thundering battle songs, which were also given by Tacitus, allude to the music of the Germans fighting on the Roman side. The fact that he actually mentions "Romans" intoning Germanic songs clearly shows how extensively the Roman army had been enforced with Germanic troops.

==== Heroic songs ====
Although Tacitus doesn't distinguish between the barditus and the heroic songs, his choice of words implies a second genre. Tacitus' cumulation of alliterations is probably the first mention of rhyme in Europe, an early form of the German Stabreim, which became widely popular in the Mediaeval Ages.

The Romans were acquainted with Germanic heroic songs, e.g. from the poetic and musical Nachleben of Arminius. The Tacitus source can be seen as the first testimony of early Germanic heroic songs. Festive singing is also attested for the night of the Roman advance in the Ems region in 15 AD. In 26 AD the insurgent Thracians were surprised by the attack of the Roman consul and general Poppaeus Sabinus during a feast with dance and singing. The Sicambri, who fought for the Roman side, countered the situation with defiant songs of their own, which could be evidence that the Celts knew improvisation as well as the ancient tradition of singing contests, which are e.g. reported by Virgil. The Goths sang heroic songs to worship their ancestors, and their tradition of tribal songs is well attested. After the battle of Campus Mauriacus the Goths were heard singing dirges for their defeated king.
