= Pyrene (daughter of Bebryx) =

Spanish or Gaulish princess in Greek mythology

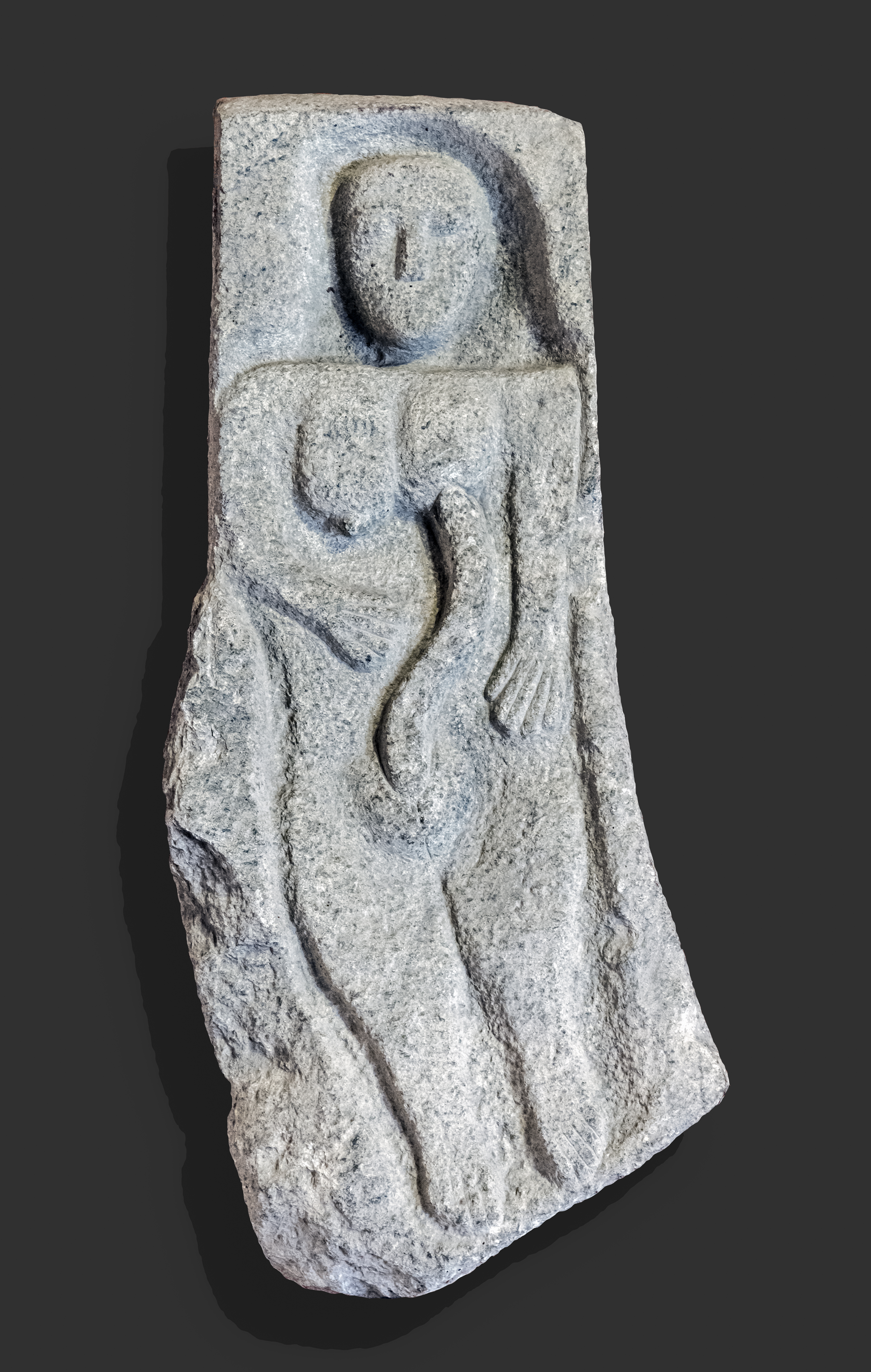
Woman with snake relief, dubiously attributed to Pyrene's myth, Musée des Augustins.

In Greek and Roman mythology, Pyrene (Ancient Greek: Πυρήνη, romanized: Purḗnē) is an Iberian princess whose tragic fate gave the Pyrenees their name. Pyrene was a lover or victim of Heracles, the Tirynthian hero who visited her country during one of his Twelve Labours. Her myth survives in the writings of Silius Italicus, a Roman author of the first century AD, but other versions are preserved from a number of authors as well. Pyrene might have originated from obscure traditions in Celtic mythology.

== Etymology ==
Traditionally Pyrene's name was connected to the noun πῦρ, the ancient Greek word for fire, sometimes in conjunction with eneos meaning 'speechless', but this has been described as folk etymology for a Celtic name. The name is likely Celtic in origin and signifies mountains.

== Mythology ==
Pyrene was a very beautiful princess, daughter of king Bebryx or Bebrycius of the Bebryces, an ancient people living on both sides of the Pyrenees which divided Spain from Gaul. (Note: See James Duff Duff's notes.) One day the hero Heracles arrived in their court on his way to obtain the flock of Geryon. After Heracles got thoroughly drunk with wine, he raped Pyrene before leaving to resume his mission.

After many months passed, Pyrene eventually gave birth to a serpent. In fear and terror of her father's reaction and wrath, she fled the court and hid in the woods in the Pyrenees. There she shed bitter tears over her ravisher Heracles and repeated his promises to the trees, mourning her treatment. But she drew the attention of wild beasts, who proceeded to tear her apart from limb to limb.

In the meantime Heracles was done with the flock, and passed through Spain once more to return home. He stumbled upon Pyrene's mangled remains, a sight which caused him great grief. His cries when he located her head made the very mountain range shake, which therefore took the name of the unfortunate maiden. Then, as last tribute, he buried her remains deep into the earth as he wept.

== In culture ==
=== Other versions and parallels ===
Several traditions relating Heracles' visit to the western Mediterranean exist, which are unambiguously set in the land of Gauls. Those accounts connect Heracles to the founding of Gaulish Alesia and becoming the forefather of Celts. According to Diodorus Siculus, the princess of the land of Celtice rejected all men in marriage, but was impressed with Heracles' strength and powess so she bore him a son, Galates, who became king when of age. In Parthenius' version the princess is called Celtine, and she concealed the cattle the hero had taken from Geryon and refused to return them unless he had sex with her, thereupon she conceived Celtus; in yet another narrative, Heracles left his bow to Princess Celto after having sex with her, and told her that in case she had a son that boy would be king if he would be able to pull the string and shoot.

Pliny the Elder considered the stories of Heracles in the Pyrenees to be products of imagination and story-telling.

=== The Scythian genealogical myth ===
The stories of Pyrene and Celtine have many similarities with the Scythian genealocical myth, in which Heracles returns from the Labour with the flock of Geryon through the land of Scythia, has his horses stolen by a snake-woman and then has to have sex with her in order to retrieve them. The woman then gives birth to three sons, one of which—Scythes—becomes the progenitor of the Scythians. The main difference of the two narratives is the appearance of the foreign woman Heracles mates with (a snake-legged Scythian demon versus a beautiful Celtic princess), the type of animals stolen (horses versus cattle), and the number of sons born by the foreign woman (three versus one).

Despite their many similarities, the exact nature of the relationship between the two different myths remains unclear, with several arguments existing both in favour and against the primacy of either tale; the cultural influence either story could had had on the other has been acknowledged, but cannot be determined with absolute certainty.

The Scythian tale might be a result of the conflation between Heracles and the local Scythian god Targī̆tavah, who is mentioned in other versions as Targitaos or Scythes, the son of Zeus (as the equivalent Scythian sky-god), likely assimilated by the Pontic Greeks from the northern shores of the Black Sea because of his important role in the foundational myths of the Greek colonists throughout the Mediterranean basin; this was used to justify new lands getting closer to the Greek world. The Celtic tale might have also been derived from a local myth of the Celts, or at least the Greeks living in Celtica.

== See also ==
- Procris
- Leucone
- Actaeon
- Auge

== Bibliography ==
- Avery, Catherine B., ed. (1962). New Century Classical Handbook. New York, US: Appleton-Century-Crofts.
- Bell, John (1790). Bell's New Pantheon. Kessinger Publishing. ISBN 978-0-7661-7834-2.
- Bell, Robert E. (1991). Women of Classical Mythology: A Biographical Dictionary. ABC-Clio. ISBN 9780874365818.
- Diodorus Siculus, Bibliotheca historica 1-7, translated by Charles Henry Oldfather (1887-1954), Cambridge, MA, Harvard University Press; London, William Heinemann Ltd. The Loeb Classical Library. 1933. Online text available at ToposText.
- Etymologicum Magnum, edited by Friedrich Sylburg. Lipsiae: Apud J.A.G. Weigel. 1816. Online text available at the Internet Archive.
- Grimal, Pierre (1987). The Dictionary of Classical Mythology. Wiley-Blackwell. ISBN 0-631-13209-0.
- Murray, ed. (1833). A Classical Manual. London, UK: John Murray.
- Parthenius, Love Romances translated by Sir Stephen Gaselee (1882–1943), S. Loeb Classical Library Volume 69. Cambridge, MA. Harvard University Press. 1916. Online version at the Topos Text Project.
- Pliny the Elder, Natural History, translation by John Bostock, M.D., F.R.S. H.T. Riley, Esq., B.A. London. Taylor and Francis, Red Lion Court, Fleet Street. 1855. Online text available at the Perseus Digital Library.
- Podossinov, Alexander V. [in Russian] (2022). "Heracles Celticus and Heracles Scythicus: the Same Narrative in the West and East of Europe?". In Boardman, J.; Hargrave, J.; Avram, A.; Podossinov, A. [in Russian] (eds.). Connecting the Ancient West and East: Studies Presented to Prof. Gocha R. Tsetskhladze. Leuven, Belgium: Peeters Publishers. ISBN 978-9-042-94414-5.
- Raevskiy, Dmitriy [in Russian] (1993). Marazov, Ivan (ed.). Scythian Mythology. Sofia, Bulgaria: Secor Publishers. ISBN 978-9-548-25002-3.
- Redondo, Jordi (2022). "The Herodotean Myth on the Origin of the Scythians". In Christopoulos, Menelaos; Papachrysostomou, Athina; Antonopoulos, Andreas P. (eds.). Myth and History: Close Encounters. Berlin, Germany; Boston, United States: Walter de Gruyter GmbH. pp. 167–186. doi:10.1515/9783110780116-011. ISBN 978-3-110-77958-5.
- Silius Italicus, Punica with an English translation by James Duff Duff, volume II. Cambridge, MA, Harvard University Press; London, William Heinemann Ltd. The Loeb Classical Library. 1927. Online text available online at Internet Archive.
