= Celtus =

Figures in Greek mythology

In Greek mythology, Celtus (/ˈsɛltəs/; Ancient Greek: Κέλτος Keltos /ˈkɛlˌtɒs/) may refer to three various figures:

- Celtus, the eponymous progenitor of the Celts. There are two alternative traditions. One, found in Appian's Illyrian Wars, holds that Celtus was the son of Polyphemos and Galatea and the brother of Illyrius and Galas. The other, found in the Erotica Pathemata ("Sorrows of Love") by the 1st-century grammarian Parthenius of Nicaea, and also known from the medieval Etymologicum Magnum, has Celtus as the son of Heracles and Celtine.
- Celtus, son of Periboea and Meges, a rich man son of Dymas. He was killed by Neoptolemus.
- Celtus, one of the Suitors of Penelope who came from Zacynthus along with other 43 wooers. He, with the other suitors, was slain by Odysseus with the help of Eumaeus, Philoetius, and Telemachus.
