= Celtine =

The princess Celtine (Ancient Greek: Κελτίνη, romanized: Keltínē) or Celto (Ancient Greek: Κελτώ, romanized: Keltṓ) is the protagonist of a Celtic ancestral myth that was recorded by several Graeco-Roman authors.

== Mythology ==
The Graeco-Roman author Diodorus of Sicily recorded one version of the Celtic genealogical myth. Diodurus's account connects the hero to the foundation of Alesia:

The country of Celtice was ruled by a renowned king whose daughter was unusually tall and was more beautiful than all other maidens, due to which she considered every man who asked her hand in marriage as unworthy of her and rejected them. Heracles, during his struggle against Geryon, visited Celtice and founded the city of Alesia there. The king's daughter was impressed by his physical excellence and had a son with him named Galates, who was more righteous and powerful than all the youths of his tribe. When Galates had reached adulthood, he became king and a great warrior, and he conquered much of the areas surrounding his tribe's territory. Due to the bravery of Galates, he called his subjects Galatai (that is, Gauls) after himself, and they in turn gave their name to Galatia (that is Gaul).

The Greek author Parthenius of Nicaea recorded another version of this Celtic genealogical myth:

When Heracles was bringing the cattle of Geryon from Erytheia, he passed through the lands of the Celts and reached the court of the king Bretannus, who had a daughter named Celtine. Celtine fell in love with Heracles and hid his cattle and refused to return them unless he had sexual intercourse with her. Heracles accepted, and from their union was born Celtus, from whom were descended the Celts.

A third version of the Celtic genealogical myth was recorded in the Etymologicum Magnum:

The daughter of the king Bretanus, Celto, had fallen in love with Heracles and asked him to have sexual intercourse with her. When this was accomplished, he left her a bow, and told her that if a son was born of their union, then he would become king if he could pull the bow. The son of Heracles and Celto was Celtus, from whom descended the Celts.

The combination of the three versions provides a common narrative:

In Celtice, that is the Celtic country, the king Bretan(n)os had a daughter named Celtine or Celto, who fell in love with Heracles who was driving the cattle of Geryon from Iberia to Tiryns. Celtine/Celto stole the cattle of Heracles to force him to have sexual intercourse with her, and from their union was born a son named Galates or Celtus to whom the mother gave a bow left by Heracles. Galates/Celtus became king after pulling the bow of Heracles and the Celts were descended from him.

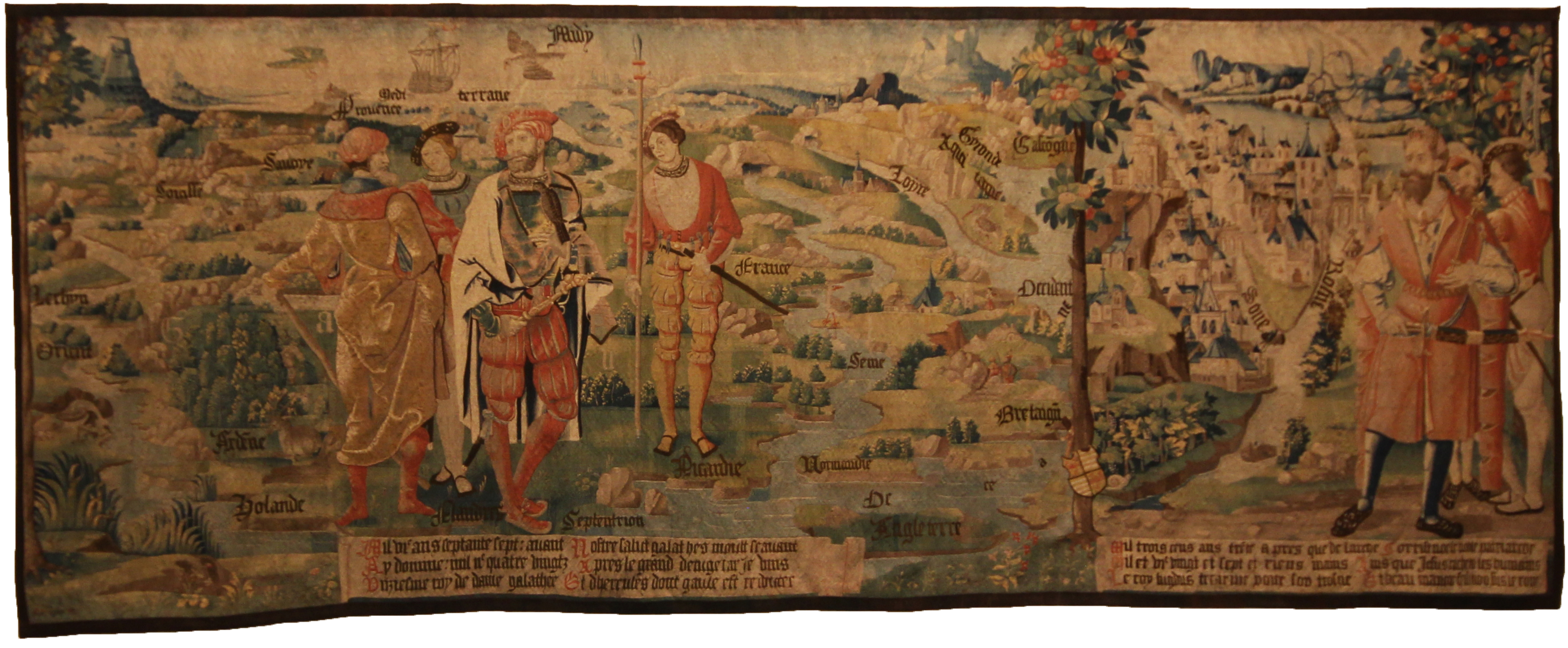
Sixteenth-century tapestry depicting a founding myth for Lyon, France, casting Hercules' son Galathes as the 11th king of Gaul and the city's founder as Lugdus, a genealogical back formation from Lugdunum, the Gaulish-Latin name of the town: the figures stand within a map of Gaul, with the Mediterranean coast of France at top and the English Channel underfoot

=== Other accounts ===
In a similar account, sourced to author Timagenes, Hercules fights against "tyrants" Geryon and Tauriscus and releases Gaul. In return, he mates with a local high-born woman and begets numerous children. Also, it is during his Tenth Labor that Hercules journeys through the Gallic coast.

Another narrative, by poet Silius Italicus (this time inserted into his epic poem), tells of Hercules guiding the cattle of Geryon and meeting king Bebruces. The Greek hero also lies with his daughter Pyrene and she gives birth to a snake. Ashamed, she takes refuge in the caves, and is eventually killed by wild animals. Hercules finds her mutilated body and cries over his lost love.

== Comparative mythology ==
=== The foundational myth ===
This legend was very similar to the Scythians genealogical myth, with common elements including Heracles driving the cattle of Geryon from Iberia to Greece, and then meeting with a local woman who abducted his horses, having sexual intercourse with the woman, and the birth from this union of a son who founded a nation and became king by pulling his father's bow.

The acquisition of the golden objects by the youngest son of Heracles in the first version of the Scythian genealogical myth, especially, has an exact parallel in the inheritance of the bow of Heracles by Galates/Celtus in the Celtic genealogical myth, with the latter corresponding to the Celtic inheritance law whereby, when heritage was partitioned between brothers, the youngest would receive the estate, all buildings, 8 acres of land, an axe, a cauldron, and a coulter.

There were nevertheless also some differences between the Scythian and Celtic genealogical myths:

- the consort of Heracles was the Snake-Legged Goddess in the Scythian myth, while she was a beautiful princess in the Celtic myth;
- the horses of the chariot of Heracles were stolen in the Scythian myth, while the cattle of Geryon that Heracles was driving were stolen in the Celtic myth;
- three sons were born from the union of Heracles and the local woman in the Scythian myth, while only one son was born in the Celtic myth.

Despite their similarities, the exact relationship between the Scythian and Celtic genealogical myths is still unclear.

=== The foreign princess and the serpent ===
The serpentine offspring from Hercules and princess Pyrene seems strange at first, but it is possible to be a reminiscence of a narrative cycle involving a founding, Hercules and a serpent (usually Echidna). The possible first version of the story involves Heracles, the civilizing hero, defeating the wild snake creature born of a local woman (who could also have been snake-like). The later second version would do away with the snake beings, and set Heracles as the mate of a local princess. The same cycle is comparable to the stories of Celtine/Kelto and the unnamed princess being ancestresses of heroes Celtus and Galates.

== Sources ==
- Podossinov, Alexander V. [in Russian] (2022). "Heracles Celticus and Heracles Scythicus: the Same Narrative in the West and East of Europe?". In Boardman, J.; Hargrave, J.; Avram, A.; Podossinov, A. [in Russian] (eds.). Connecting the Ancient West and East: Studies Presented to Prof. Gocha R. Tsetskhladze. Leuven, Belgium: Peeters Publishers. pp. 1291–1306. ISBN 978-9-042-94414-5.
