= Galas =

Son of Polyphemus in Greek mythology

In Greek mythology, Galas (/ˈɡeɪləs/; Ancient Greek: Γάλας Gálas) was the eponymous founder of the Gauls. He was the son of Polyphemos and Galatea and the brother of Illyrius and Celtus.
