= Enchele =

Illyrian people

The Enchelei (Note: The Enchelei are alternatively known as Encheleans, Enchelii/Encheleioi, Enchelanes/Engelanes, Encheleis (Ancient Greek: Ἐγχελεῖς), or Encheleae.) were an ancient people that lived around Lake Lychnidus and in the upper Drin valley, later expanding as far as Lake Shkodra and Buthoe on the Adriatic coast in modern-day Montenegro, Albania and North Macedonia. They are one of the oldest known peoples of the central Balkan and also the eastern shore of the Adriatic Sea. In ancient sources they sometimes appear as an ethnic group distinct from the Illyrians, but they are mostly mentioned as one of the Illyrian tribes. They held a central position in the earlier phase of Illyrian history and established the first Illyrian Kingdom in the 8th–7th century BC. In ancient Greek literature they are linked with the end of the mythical narrative of Cadmus and Harmonia.

The name Sesarethii/Sesarethioi was used by Strabo as an alternative name for the Enchelei in the lakeland area of Lychnidus. Mentioned for the first time by Hecataeus of Miletus in the 6th century BC, the name Sesarethii/Sesarethioi is also considered a variant of Dassaretii/Dassaretioi, an Illyrian tribe that has been recorded since Roman times and that is attested in coinage and inscriptions found around lake Lychnidus.

The region inhabited by the Enchelei was known as Enchele. (Note: Ancient Greek: Ἐγχέλη) Their neighbors to the west were the Taulantii, to the north the Autariatae, to the north-east the Dardani, to the south-east the Paeones, and to the south the Dexaroi.

== Name ==
=== Etymology ===
The name Enchelei is thought to have meant "eel people", as in Ancient Greek ἔγχελυς means "eel", like in modern Albanian ngjalë "eel", Illyrian *engella, possibly cognates to Latin: anguilla "eel" and Lithuanian: ungurỹs "eel". The connection with Albanian ngjalë makes it possible that the name Enchele was derived from the Illyrian term for eels, which may have been anciently related to Greek and simply adjusted to the Greek pronunciation. An Indo-European pre-form of the root still cannot be reconstructed. Robert S. P. Beekes considers it pre-Greek, which matches the timeframe of an early Illyrian origin of the ethnonym through the legendary story of Cadmus and the Enchelei.

=== Attestation and variants ===
The Enchelei are mentioned for the first time by Hecataeus of Miletus in the 6th century BC. Variants of the name are Enchelanes or Engelanes in Ionic Greek and Encheleis in the Beotian dialect of ancient Greek.

Enchelanes/Engelanes bear the suffix -anes typical in the western Greek dialects spoken by the Greek neighbors of the Enchelei. In Polybius the word is written with a voiceless aspirate kh, Enchelanes, while in Mnaseas it was replaced with a voiced ng, Engelanes, the latter being a typical feature of the Ancient Macedonian and northern Paleo-Balkan languages.

=== Other names ===
An alternative name for the Enchelei in the lakeland area of Ohrid is recorded by Strabo as Sesarethii. The name Sesarethioi is mentioned for the first time by Hecataeus of Miletus in the 6th century BC. Hecataeus reported that the tribe of Chelidonioi (Χελιδόνιοι) lived to the north of the Sesarethioi (Σεσαρήθιοι). Furthermore he reports that Sesarethos (Σεσάρηθος) was a Taulantian city, with Sesarethioi as its ethnicon. The name Sesarethii/Sesarethioi is also considered a variant of Dassaretii/Dassaretioi, an Illyrian tribe that has been recorded since Roman times and that is attested in coinage and inscriptions found around lake Ohrid. While describing Polybius provides information of greater credibility concerning Strabo’s evidence that the Enchelei/ Engelanes were also called Sessarethii (Strab.,7.7.8), i.e. Dassaretae – a generally accepted emendation of the apparently wrongly recorded name Sessarethae.

== Mythological accounts ==
A legend widespread in antiquity reports that Cadmus – the Phoenician prince, brother of Europa, and founder of Thebes, and a Boeotian and Enchelean figure – with his wife Harmonia arrived among the Enchelei and helped them build many towns on the shores of Lake Ohrid and Lake Shkodra, among them Lychnidus (Ohrid) and Bouthoe (Budva). As the legend says it and reported by, at that time the Enchele were at war with neighboring Illyrian tribes and Cadmus, after orders from the Oracle of Delphi, became leader of the people and came to their aid. After the victory against the Illyrians, the Enchele chose Cadmus as their king.

Apollodorus wrote that the Encheleis/Engelanes would win a war against Illyrians only if led by Cadmus (Apoll., Bibl. 3.5.4), which actually happened according to Herodotus. After that, Cadmus ruled over the Illyrians, where his son Illyrius was born. According to Virgil, Harmonia gave birth to Illyrius near the Illyrian river (presumably Drin/Drilon). (Virgil, Aeneid, Scholia Vaticana I, 243).

In Euripides’ Bakchai, Bacchus pronounces Zeus’ prophetic words that Cadmus will ruin many cities and will loot the sanctuary of Phoebus (Eurip., Bakchai 1335-1340), leading a mixed barbarian army (this is obviously the Illyrian and Enchelean army mentioned by Herodotus), and that he (Cadmus) and Harmonia would anyway be saved by Ares transformed into dragon and taken to the land of the blessed---the Elysian Fields. In the account of Philo of Byblos (2nd century AD), the myth of the reptilian transformation of Cadmus and Harmonia is linked to the Illyrian tribes, as the location of Elysian Fields was considered by the Greeks to be somewhere on the Adriatic Sea coast. According to Apollonius of Rhodes (3rd century BC), the graves of Cadmus and Harmonia were on the banks of the Illyrian river, and somewhere there were the Encheleis/Engelanes.

A mythological tradition reported by Appian (2nd century AD) tells that the Enchelei were among the South-Illyrian tribes that took their names from the first generation of the descendants of Illyrius, the eponymous ancestor of all the Illyrian peoples. According to Appian's account the progenitor to the Enchele was Encheleus, a son of Illyrius.

According to Polybius andcited by Stephanus of Byzantium, after the disappearance of Amphiaraus during the siege of Thebes, his charioteer Baton settled in Illyria, near the country of the Enchelei.

== History ==
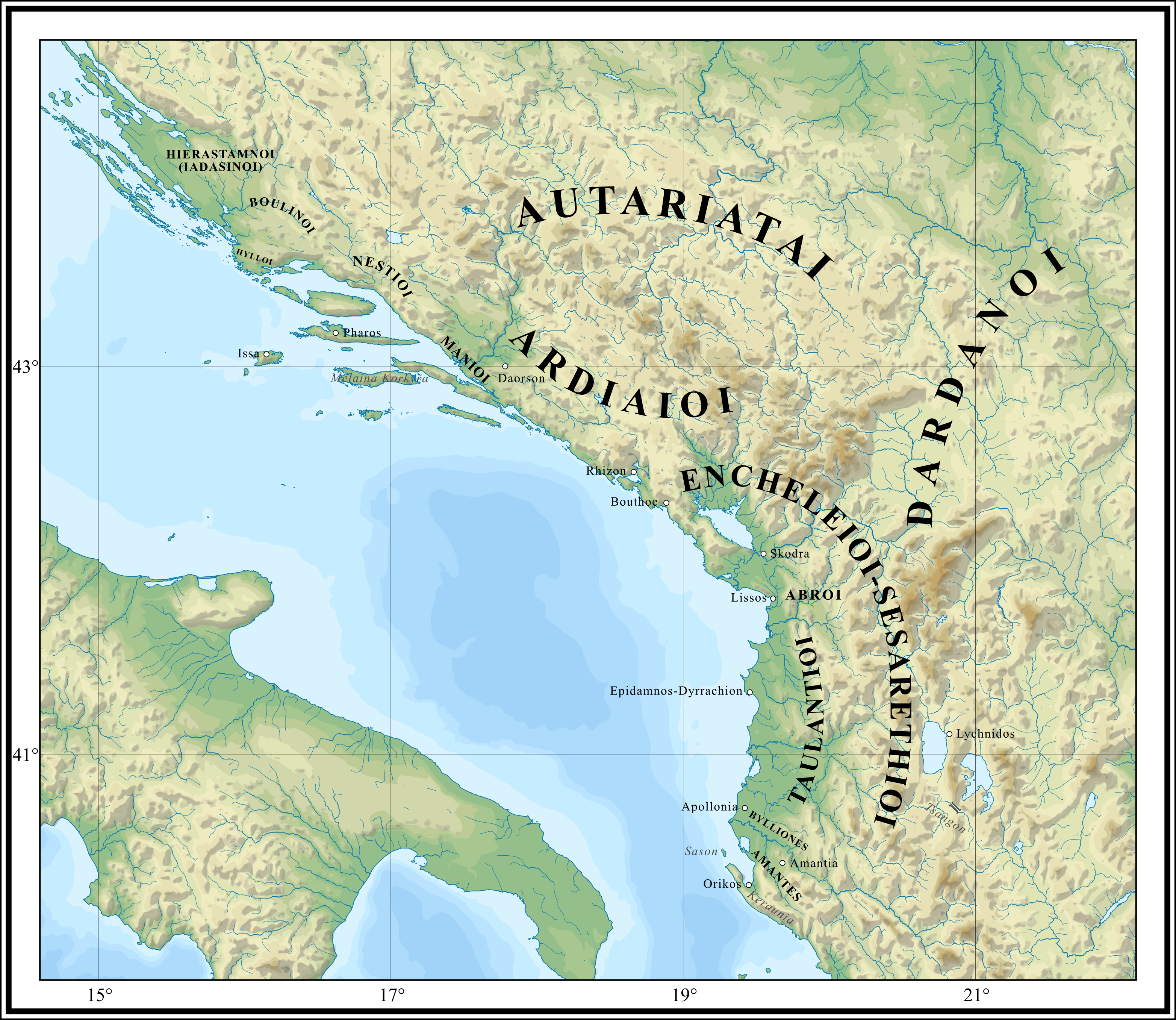
Illyrian tribes in the 7th–4th centuries BCE.

In southern Illyria organized states were formed earlier than in other areas of this region. The oldest known state in the region which can be discussed about from ancient sources is that of the Enchelei. The height of the Enchelean state was from the 8th–7th centuries BC, but the kingdom fell from dominant power around the 6th century BC. Some authors hypothesize that the seeming weakening of the Enchele kingdom resulted from their assimilation and inclusion into the newly established Illyrian realm of the Dassareti, however, per Polybius and Strabo’s accounts, the Enchele were also called Dassareti/Sessarethii.

As reported in a fragment of Hecataeus of Miletus (around 6th century BC), Enchelei neighbored the Dexaroi, a Chaonian tribe.

The Enchelei were often at war with the northern Greeks. From written sources from Greek writers such as Herodotus, the Enchelean army is recorded attacking the temple of Delphi.

Justin (2nd century AD) reports that at a time when the ruler of Macedonia was the infant Aeropus I (around 6th century BC), the Illyrians attacked successfully Macedonia until the infant ruler was brought to a battle by his Macedonian subjects, benefitting from his presence and avenging their initial defeat against the Illyrians. The name of the specific Illyrian tribe or group of tribes that attacked Macedonia is not reported in Justin's account, but it has been suggested that they would have been either the Enchelei, whose realm was centered at that time in the area of Lake Lychnidus, or the Taulantii, who were based farther west, in the coastal area within and around Epidamnos and Apollonia. The Illyrian raids against the Argeads who were based at Aegae indicate that Illyrian attacks also involved the Upper Macedonian regions of Lynkestis, Orestis and Eordaea, Elimea, and Tymphaea, as they were located between Illyrian territory and Argead lands.

In 217 BC, Enchelei/Engelanes are mentioned in Polybius’ account of the battle between Philip V and the Illyrian ruler Scerdilaidas in Dassaretia (Polyb.5.108).

The Enchelean area of river Drilon and lake Shkodra in northern Albania saw in later times the emergence of the Labeates, an Illyrian tribe who retained their distinct identity until the early Roman period.

The Enchelei are mentioned for the last time in mid-1st c. AD by Pomponius Mela (Pomp. Mela, Chorographia 2.54–56) who distinguished them from the Illyrian tribes whom he names proprie Illyrios vocant.

== Archeological Finds ==
An ancient necropolis dating from the Iron Age (circa 7th century BC to ) was discovered in Trebeništa near the northern shore of Lake Ohrid. It is believed that the necropolis was used from the end of 7th century to the 4th/3rd century BC by the people from the nearby Illyrian town Lychnidos of the Enchelei.

A large amounts of graves have been excavated. Among the notable findings are five golden masks, some iron earrings and plates, a bronze krater, several Illyrian type helmets, and a Corinthian helmet. The five golden funeral masks are reminiscent of the much older Mask of Agamemnon from the Mycenae culture.

While a number of artifacts excavated in the necropolis are said to be imported from ancient Greece, most are of a local origin with possible Greek or Thracian influences or a mixed Balkano-Aegean cultural expression. Archaeological material with gold-riches from the burials at Trebeništa, Aiani on the Haliacmon river valley, and Sindos on the Thermaic Gulf indicates substantial cultural continuity, trade and exchange throughout the wider Balkan region despite the fact that different tribes lived in it.

== See also ==
- List of ancient Illyrian peoples and tribes
- List of ancient tribes in Illyria

== Bibliography ==
- Apollodorus; Hard, Robin (1999), The Library of Greek Mythology, Oxford, United Kingdom: Oxford University Press, ISBN 0-19-283924-1
- Bogdani, Julian (2012). "Genesi urbana e organizzazione del territorio nella Caonia di età classica ed ellenistica". In Enrico Giorgi, Julian Bogdani (ed.). Il territorio di Phoinike in Caonia: archeologia del paesaggio in Albania meridionale. Ante Quem. pp. 355–395. ISBN 9788878490796.
- Cabanes, Pierre (2008). "Greek Colonisation in the Adriatic". In Tsetskhladze, Gocha R. (ed.). Greek Colonisation: An Account of Greek Colonies and Other Settlements Overseas. Vol. 2. Brill. pp. 155–186. ISBN 9789047442448.
- Castiglioni, Maria Paola (2007). "Genealogical Myth and Political Propaganda in Antiquity: the Re-Use of Greek Myths from Dionysius to Augustus". In Carvalho, Joaquim (ed.). Religion and Power in Europe: Conflict and Convergence. Edizioni Plus. ISBN 978-88-8492-464-3.
- Castiglioni, Maria Paola (2010). Cadmos-serpent en Illyrie: itinéraire d'un héros civilisateur (in French). Edizioni Plus. ISBN 9788884927422.
- Eichner, Heiner (2004). "Illyrisch – die unbekannte Sprache". In Eichner, Heiner (ed.). Die Illyrer. Archäologische Funde des 1. Vorchristlichen Jahrtausends aus Albanien (in German). Museum für Urgeschichte Asparn an der Zaya. pp. 92–117. ISBN 3-85460-215-4.
- Erdkamp, Paul (1998). Hunger and the sword: warfare and food supply in Roman Republican wars (264-30 B.C.). Dutch monographs on ancient history and archaeology. Vol. 20. Gieben. ISBN 978-90-50-63608-7.
- Greenwalt, William S. (2011). "Macedonia, Illyria and Epirus". In Roisman, Joseph; Worthington, Ian (eds.). A Companion to Ancient Macedonia. John Wiley & Sons. pp. 279–305. ISBN 978-1-4443-5163-7.
- Grimal, Pierre; Maxwell-Hyslop, A. R. (1996), The Dictionary of Classical Mythology, Wiley-Blackwell, ISBN 0-631-20102-5
- Dedvukaj, Lindon (2023). "Linguistic evidence for the Indo-European and Albanian origin of Aphrodite". Proceedings of the Linguistic Society of America. 8 (1). Linguistic Society of America: 5500. doi:10.3765/plsa.v8i1.5500. S2CID 258381736.
- Dzino, Danijel (2014). "'Illyrians' in ancient ethnographic discourse". Dialogues d'histoire ancienne. 40 (2): 45–65. doi:10.3917/dha.402.0045.
- Hammond, N. G. L. (1982). "Illyris, Epirus and Macedonia". In John Boardman; N. G. L. Hammond (eds.). The Cambridge Ancient History: The Expansion of the Greek World, Eighth to Sixth Centuries B.C. Vol. III (part 3) (2 ed.). Cambridge University Press. ISBN 0521234476.
- Hatzopoulos, M. B. (1997). "The Borders of Hellenism in Epirus during Antiquity". In M. V. Sakellariou (ed.). Ηπειρος: 4000 χρόνια ελληνικής ιστορίας και πολιτισμού. Ekdotike Athenon. ISBN 9789602133712.
- Katičić, Radoslav (1977). "Enhelejci (Die Encheleer)" [The Encheleans]. Godišnjak Centra za balkanološka ispitivanja (15): 5–82.
- Lippert, Andreas; Matzinger, Joachim (2021). Die Illyrer: Geschichte, Archäologie und Sprache. Kohlhammer Verlag. ISBN 9783170377103.
- Mesihović, Salmedin; Šačić, Amra (2015). Historija Ilira [History of Illyrians] (in Bosnian). Sarajevo: Univerzitet u Sarajevu [University of Sarajevo]. ISBN 978-9958-600-65-4.
- Papazoglu, Fanula (1978). The Central Balkan Tribes in pre-Roman Times: Triballi, Autariatae, Dardanians, Scordisci and Moesians. Amsterdam: Hakkert. ISBN 9789025607937.
- Šašel Kos, Marjeta (1993). "Cadmus and Harmonia in Illyria". Arheološki Vestnik. 44: 113–136.
- Šašel Kos, Marjeta (2004). "Mythological stories concerning Illyria and its name". In P. Cabanes; J.-L. Lamboley (eds.). L'Illyrie méridionale et l'Epire dans l'Antiquité. Vol. 4. pp. 493–504.
- Stipčević, Aleksandar (1989). Iliri: povijest, život, kultura [The Illyrians: history and culture] (in Croatian). Školska knjiga. ISBN 9788603991062.
- Theodossiev, Nikola (1998). "The dead with golden faces: Dasaretian, Pelagonian, Mygdonian and Boeotian funeral masks". Oxford Journal of Archaeology. 17 (3). Blackwell Publishing: 345–367. doi:10.1111/1468-0092.00067.
- Wilkes, John J. (1992). The Illyrians. Oxford, United Kingdom: Blackwell Publishing. ISBN 0-631-19807-5.
- Winnifrith, Tom (2002). Badlands, Borderlands: A History of Northern Epirus/Southern Albania. Duckworth. ISBN 978-0-7156-3201-7.
