= Sesarethus =

Ancient city in Illyria

Sesarethus (Ancient Greek: Σεσάρηθος) was an ancient city in southern Illyria. Stephanus of Byzantium from the 6th century AD reports, citing Hecataeus (6th century BC), that Sesarethos was a Taulantian city, and that Sesarethioi was its ethnicon. The city and the tribal name Sessarethes have been related by modern scholars to the Illyrian tribe of Dassaretii. The variant Sesarethii is also mentioned by Strabo (1st century BC – 1st century AD) as an alternative name of the Enchelei.

== See also ==
- List of settlements in Illyria

== Bibliography ==
- Eichner, Heiner (2004). "Illyrisch – die unbekannte Sprache". In Eichner, Heiner (ed.). Die Illyrer. Archäologische Funde des 1. Vorchristlichen Jahrtausends aus Albanien (in German). Museum für Urgeschichte Asparn an der Zaya. pp. 92–117. ISBN 3-85460-215-4.
- Ujes, Dubravka (2002). "Recherche sur la localisation de Damastion et ses mines". Revue numismatique. 6th. 6 (158): 103–129. doi:10.3406/numi.2002.1438.
- Winnifrith, Tom J. (2002). Badlands-borderlands: a history of Northern Epirus/Southern Albania. London: Duckworth. ISBN 0-7156-3201-9.
