= Bebrycius =

Bebrycius (Ancient Greek: Βεβρύκιος) or Bebryx, in Greek mythology, was a king and the father of Pyrene. The mythical tribe of the Bebryces is presumably named after a hero named Bebrycus.
