= Taulas =

Son of Illyrius

In Greek mythology, Taulas (Ancient Greek: Tαύλας) was one of the six sons of Illyrius and the eponymous ancestor of the Taulantii.
