= Perrhaebus =

In Greek mythology, Perrhaebus (Ancient Greek: Περραιβός) was one of the sons of Illyrius and the eponymous founder of the Perrhaebi.
