= Autarieus =

In Greek mythology, Autarieus (Ancient Greek: Αὐταριεύς) was one of the sons of Illyrius and the eponymous founder of the Autariates.
