= Encheleus =

Character in Greek mythology

In Greek mythology, Enchelus (Ancient Greek: Εγχελέα) was one of the sons of Illyrius and the eponymous ancestor of the Enchelaeae.
