= Perrhaebi =

Ancient Greek people

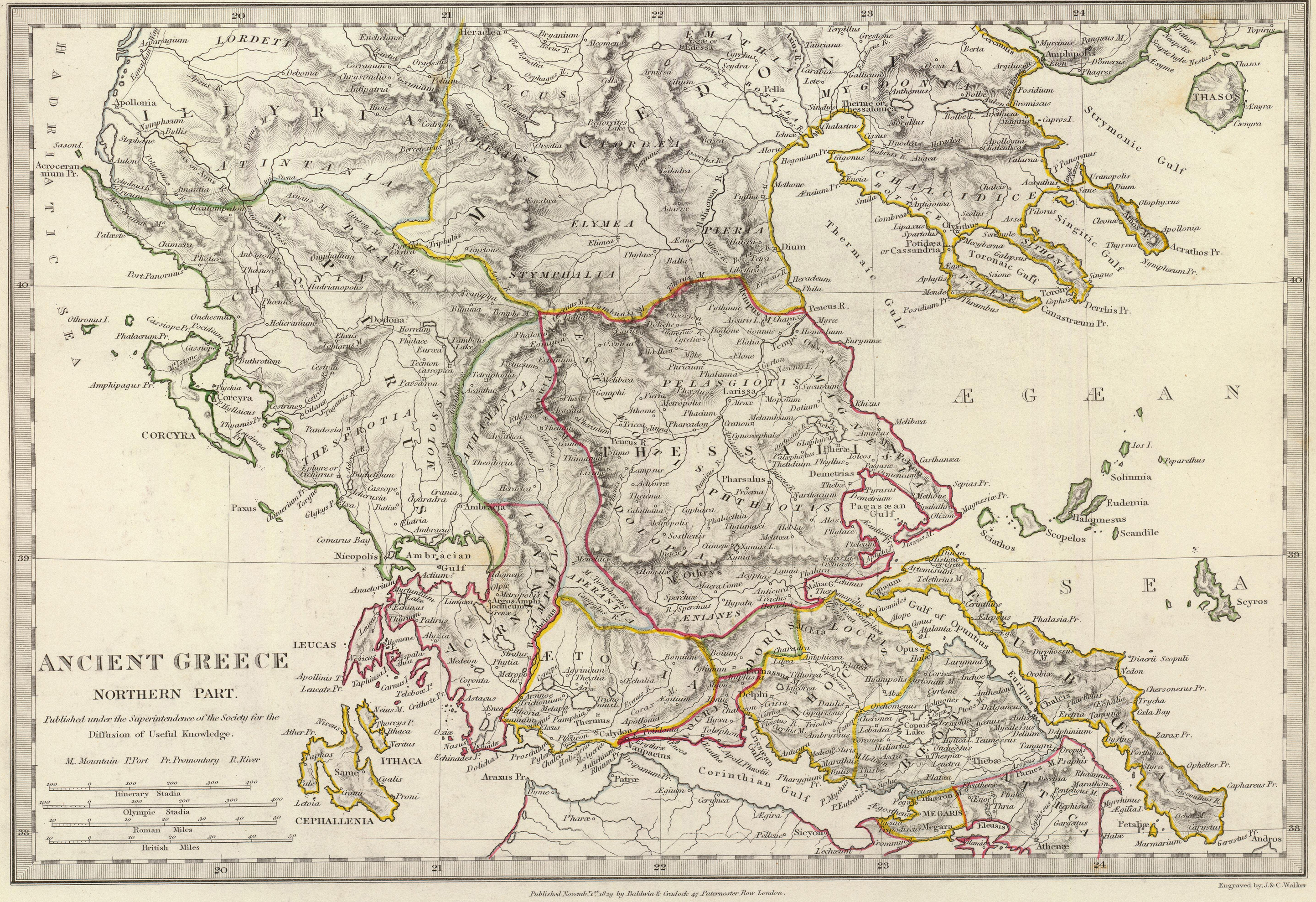
Phallana is west of Ossa mountain, above Pelasgiotis

The Perrhaebi (Ancient Greek: Περραιβοί) or Peraebi (Περαιβοί) were an ancient Greek people who lived on the western slopes of Olympus, on the border between Thessaly and Macedonia. They took part in the Trojan War under Guneus and also fought in the Battle of Thermopylae.

== History ==
Still independent at the time of the Iliad, they were tributary períoikoi to the neighbouring Thessali in the 5th century BC, with a special dependence upon the city of Larisa. They could, however, enjoy some degree of autonomy whenever the Thessalian League was weaker, and they had retained from their independence two votes in the Delphic Amphictyonic League (Amphiktyonía), until Philip II of Macedon took one vote from them. They were part of the Macedonian Kingdom until the Roman conquest by Titus Quinctius Flamininus in 196 BC.

They were listed in Xerxes' vast army by Herodotus. A coin of the Perrhaebi depicted a man restraining a bull on one side and a horse on the other. The inscription was "Περραιβών".

== Geography ==
Most of their country was mountainous and sparsely inhabited. Their principal towns were Phalanna, situated in fertile plains, and Oloosson, the tribal capital.

== See also ==
Perrhaebus:Eponymous founder
