= Acis and Galatea =

Ancient Greek myth

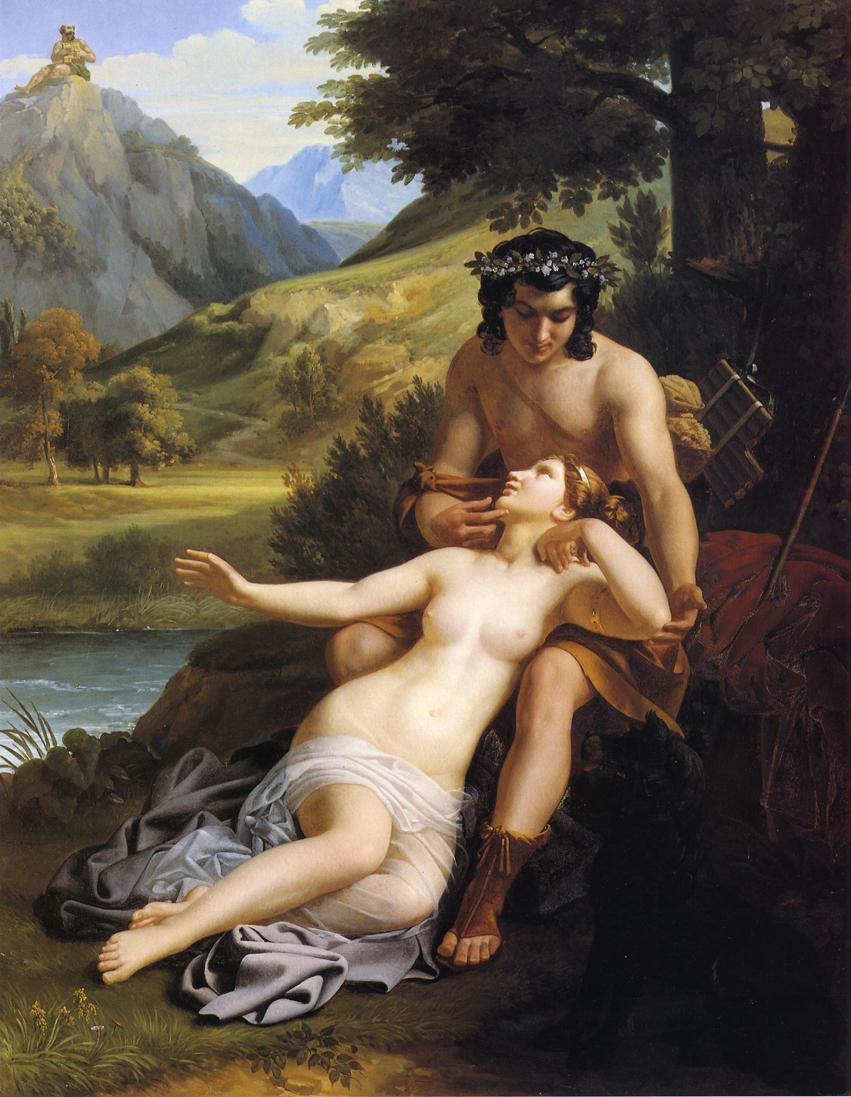
The Loves of Acis and Galatea by Alexandre Charles Guillemot (1827)

Acis and Galatea (/ˈeɪsɪs/, /ɡæləˈtiː.ə/) are characters from Greek mythology later associated together in Ovid's Metamorphoses. The episode tells of the love between the mortal Acis and the Nereid (sea-nymph) Galatea; when the jealous Cyclops Polyphemus kills Acis, Galatea transforms her lover into an immortal river spirit. The episode was made the subject of poems, operas, paintings, and statues in the Renaissance and after.

== Mythology ==
Galathea or Galatea (Ancient Greek: Γαλάτεια, lit. 'she who is milk-white'), the "glorious" and "comely" daughter of the "Old Man of the Sea" Nereus and the Oceanid Doris, was a sea-nymph anciently attested in the work of both Homer and Hesiod, where she is described as the fairest and most beloved of the 50 Nereids. According to Theocritus (Idylls 6 and 11), she aroused the love of a most improbable suitor, the Sicilian Cyclops Polyphemus. Her name is also mentioned several times by Virgil.

In Ovid's Metamorphoses, Galatea appears as the beloved of Acis, the son of Faunus and the river-nymph Symaethis, daughter of the River Symaethus. One day, when Galatea was lying beside the sea with her lover, Polyphemus saw them. The latter, in his jealousy, tore an enormous boulder out of the side of Mt. Etna and hurled it at Acis, crushing him to death. Galatea then turned his blood into sparkling waters as it trickled from under the rock, so creating the stream on Etna that bore his name, the Sicilian river Acis. She turned her lover himself into the horned god of the stream. He retained his original features except that he was larger and his face a deep blue.

This version of the tale now occurs nowhere earlier than in Ovid's work and might perhaps have been a fiction invented by the poet, "suggested by the manner in which the little river springs forth from under a rock." But according to the Greek scholar Athenaeus, the story was first concocted by Philoxenus of Cythera as a political satire against the Sicilian tyrant Dionysius I of Syracuse, whose favourite concubine, Galatea, shared her name with the nymph. Others claim that the story was invented to explain the presence of a shrine dedicated to Galatea on Mount Etna.

According to a later tradition, Galatea eventually yielded to Polyphemus' embraces. Their son, Galas or Galates, became the ancestor of the Gauls. The Hellenistic historian Timaeus, who was of Sicilian birth, described Galates as a son of Polyphemos and Galateia.

Galatea, together with Doto and Panope, escorted her sister Thetis out of the sea to her wedding with Peleus. In Homer's Iliad, Galatea and her other sisters appear to Thetis when she cries out in sympathy for the grief of Achilles at the slaying of his friend Patroclus.

== Cultural references ==
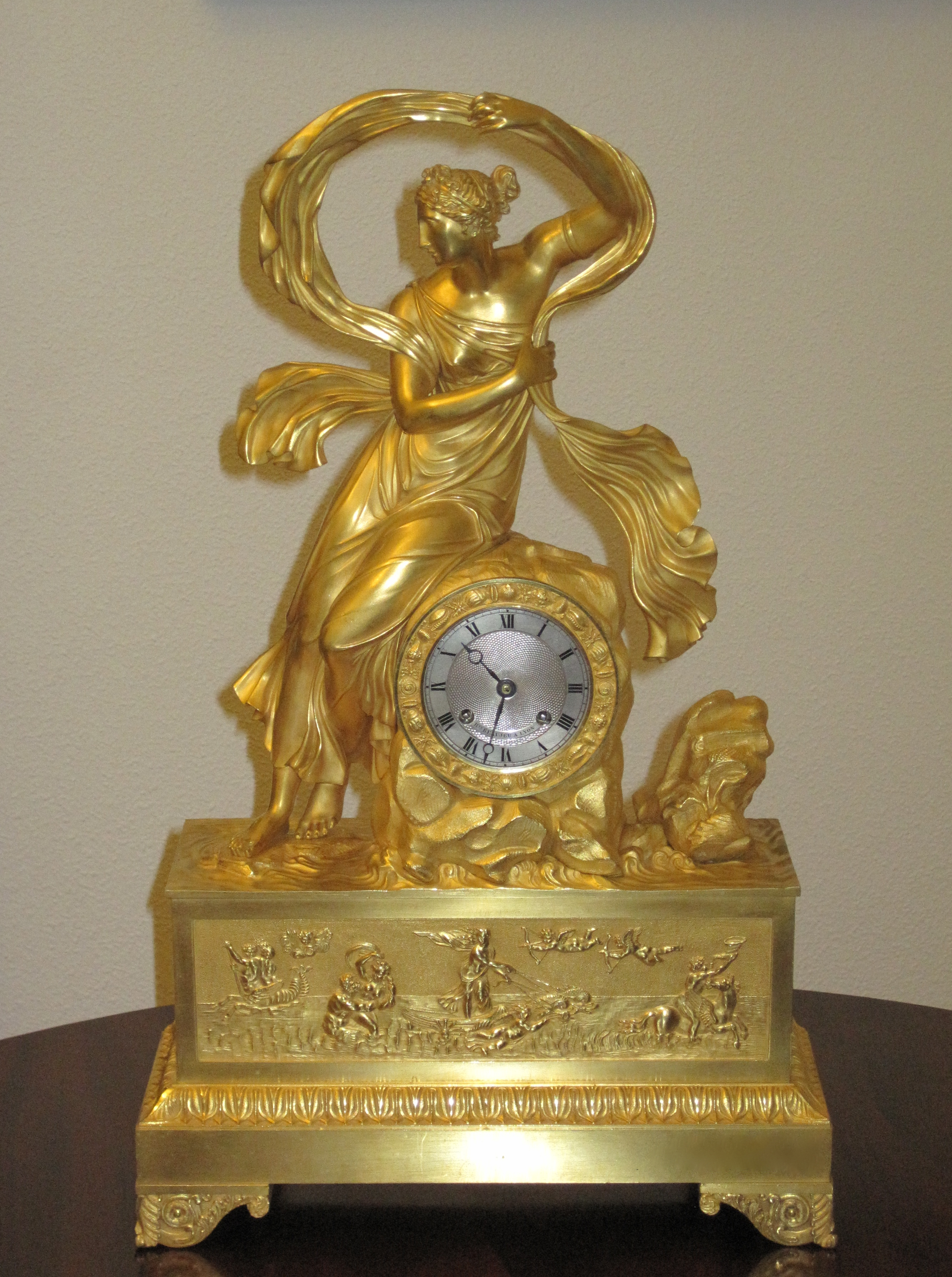
An 1822 French Empire mantel clock depicting Galatea. The design on its frieze is based on Rafael's fresco.

=== Literary and operatic ===
During Renaissance and Baroque times the story emerged once more as a popular theme. In Spain, Luis de Góngora wrote the narrative poem, Fábula de Polifemo y Galatea, published in 1627. It is particularly noted for its depiction of landscape and for the sensual description of the love of Acis and Galatea. The poem was written in homage to an earlier narrative with the same title by Luis Carillo y Sotomayor (1611) The story was also given operatic treatment in a zarzuela written by Antonio de Literes (1708).

In France, Jean-Baptiste Lully wrote the opera Acis et Galatée (1686) which was about the Greek myth. Described by him as a pastoral-heroic work, it depicts a love triangle between the three main characters—Acis, Galatea, and Poliphème. Poliphème murders Acis out of jealousy, but Acis is revived and turned into a river by Neptune. In Italy Giovanni Bononcini's one-act opera Polifemo followed in 1703.

Shortly afterwards George Frideric Handel composed the cantata Aci, Galatea e Polifemo (1708). After Handel's move to England, he gave the story a new treatment in his pastoral opera Acis and Galatea with an English libretto provided by John Gay. Initially composed in 1718, the work went through many revisions and was later to be given updated orchestrations by both Mozart and Mendelssohn. As a pastoral work where Polyphemus plays only a minor part, it largely focuses on the two lovers.

While staying in London, Nicola Porpora composed the opera Polifemo which features Acis and Galatea as well as the former's encounter with Polyphemus. In Austria later in the century, Joseph Haydn composed Acide e Galatea (1763). Designed for an imperial wedding, it was given a happier ending centered on the transformation scene after the murder of Acis as the pair declare their undying love.

=== Painting ===
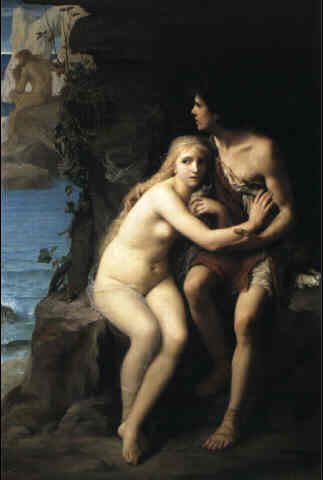
Acis and Galatea hiding from Polyphemus, by Édouard Zier (1877)

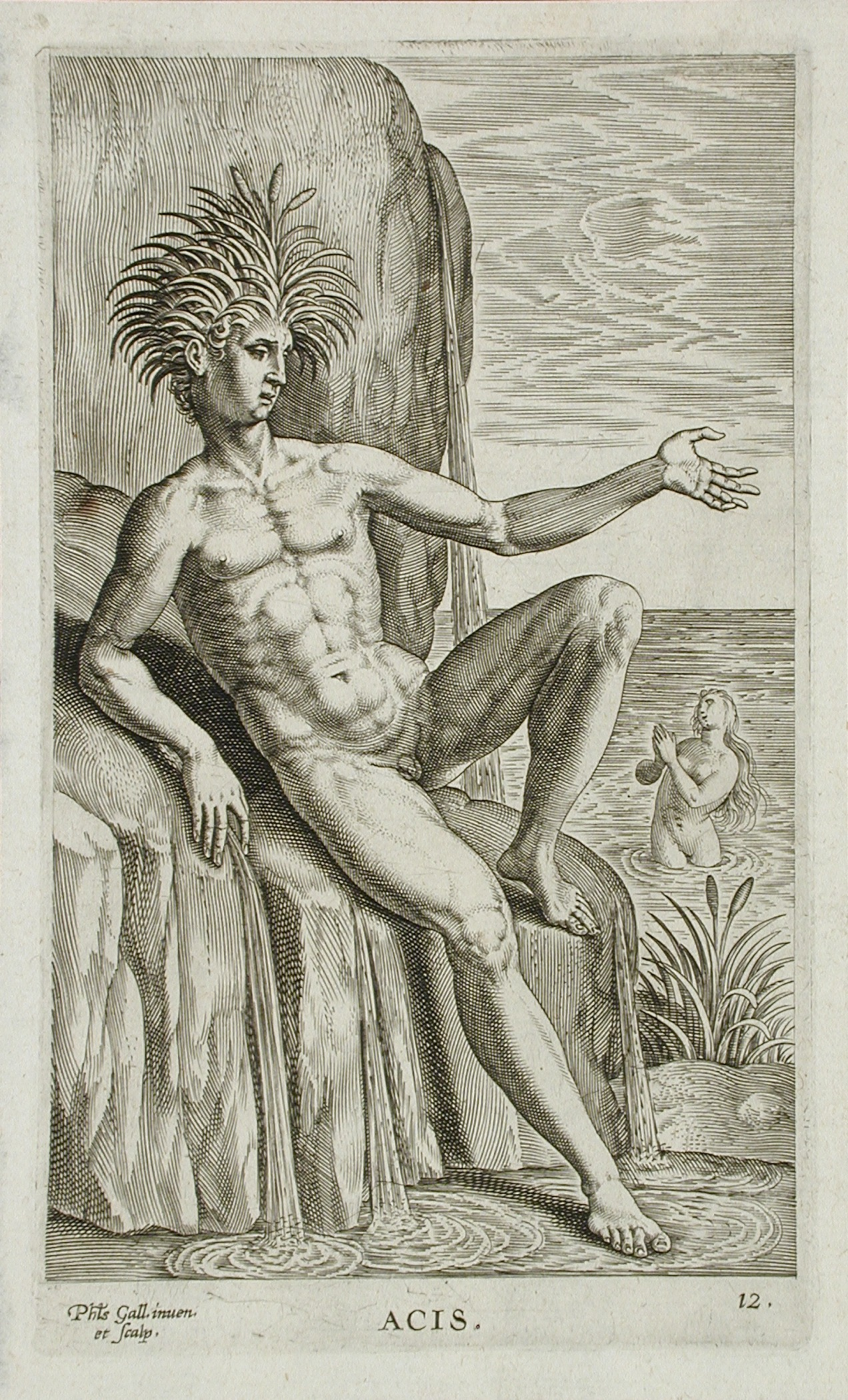
Acis, by Philip Galle (1586)

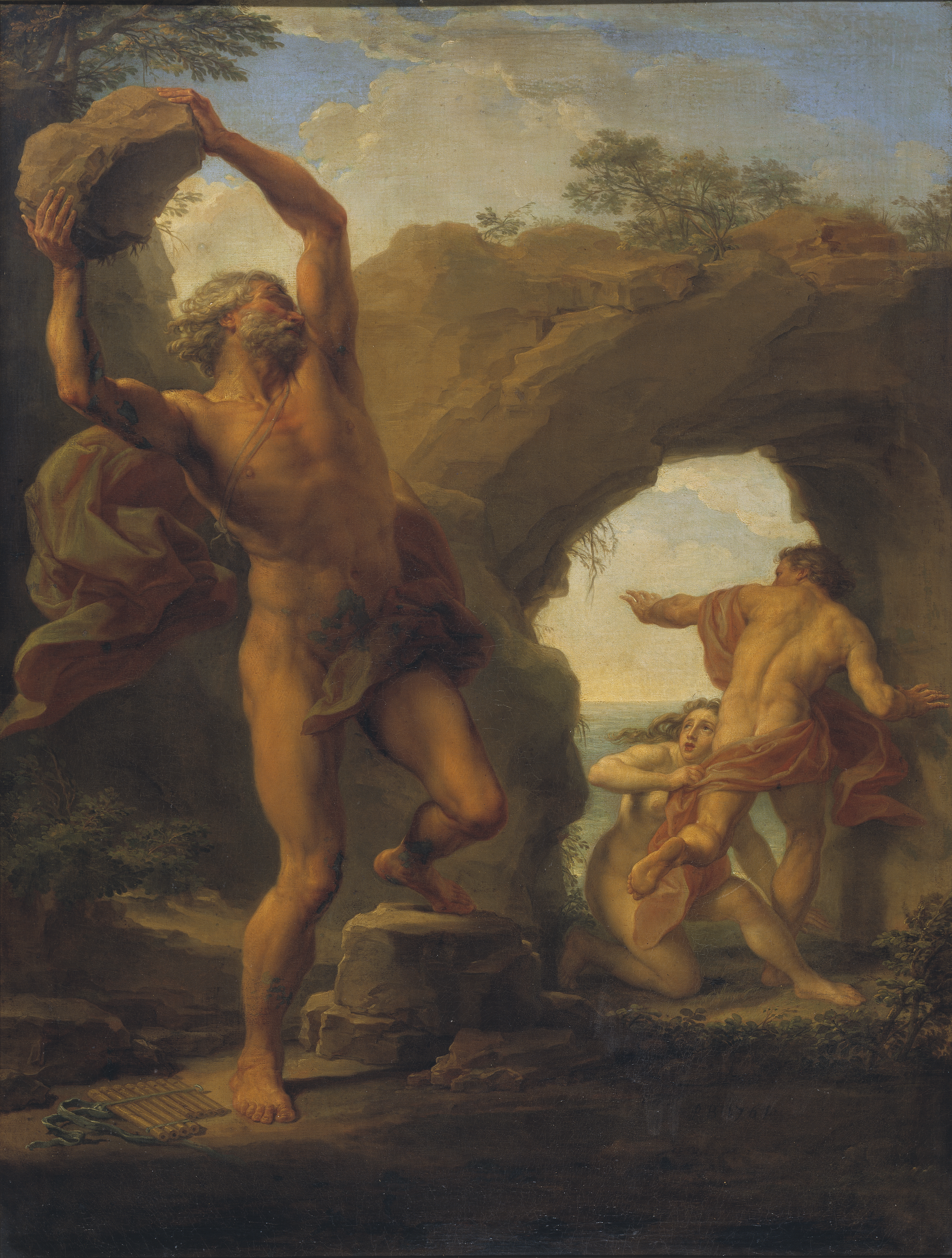
Atis and Galathea, by Pompeo Batoni (1761)

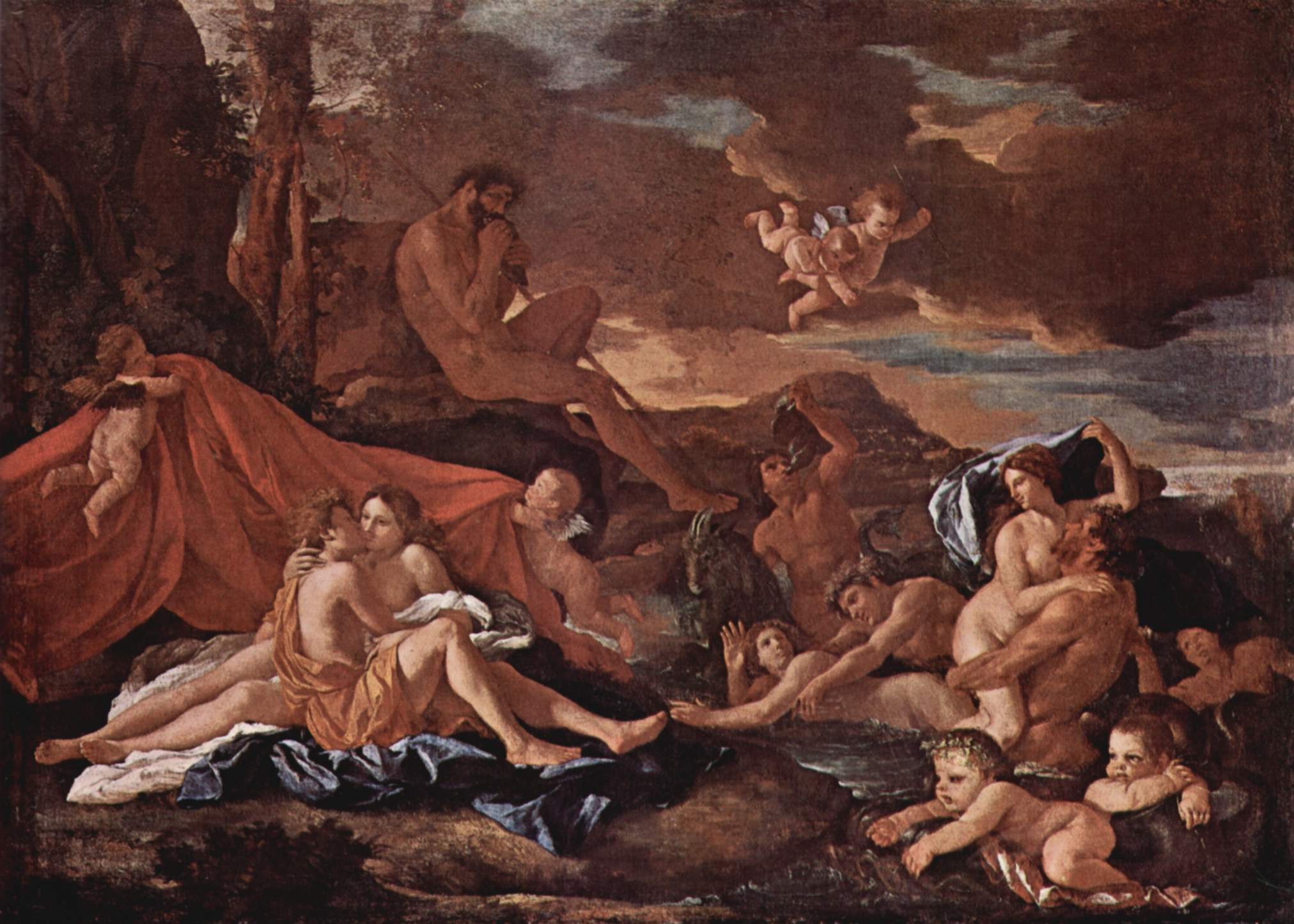
Acis and Galatea, by Nicolas Poussin (c. 1629–1630)

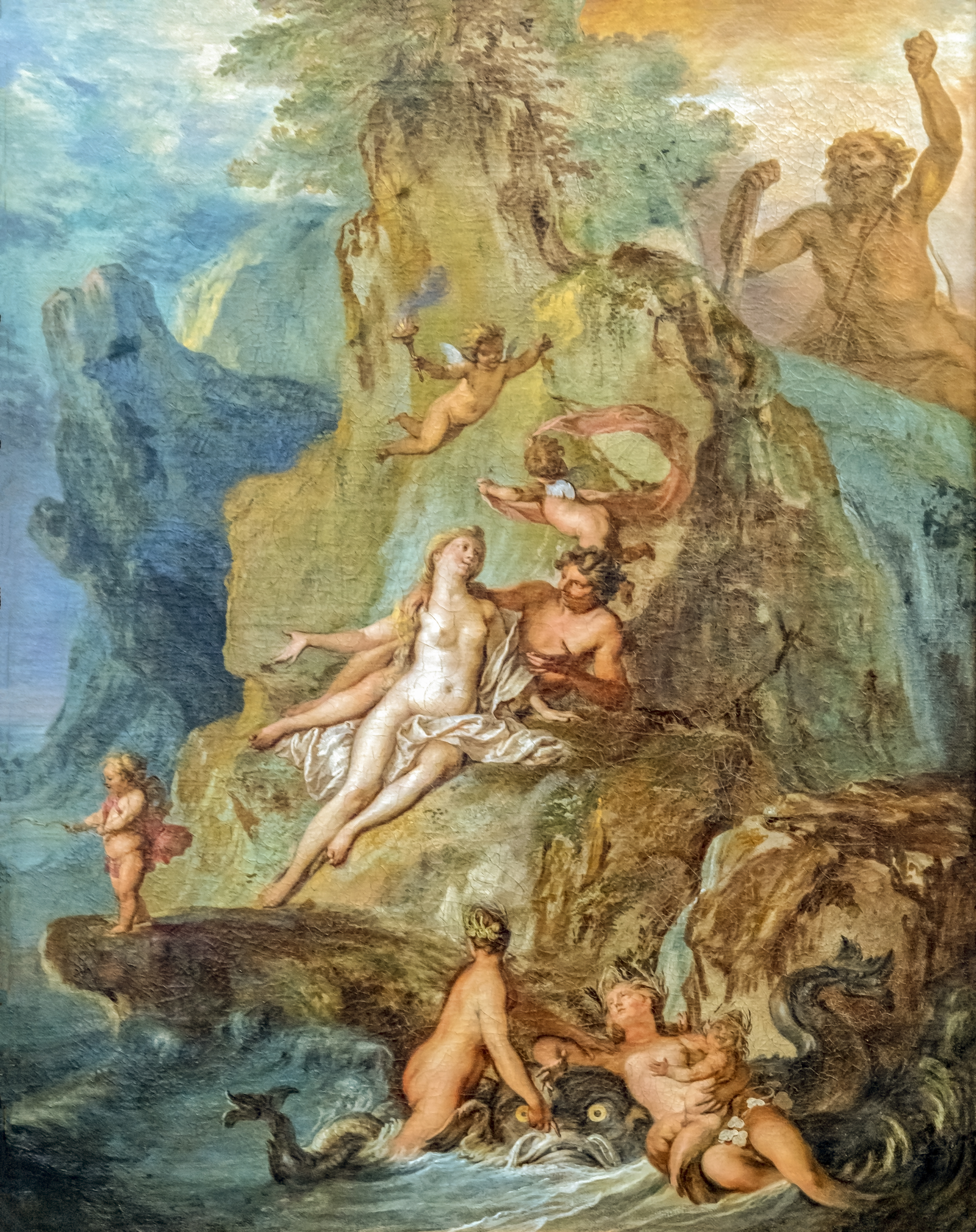
Acis and Galatea, by Nicolas Bertin

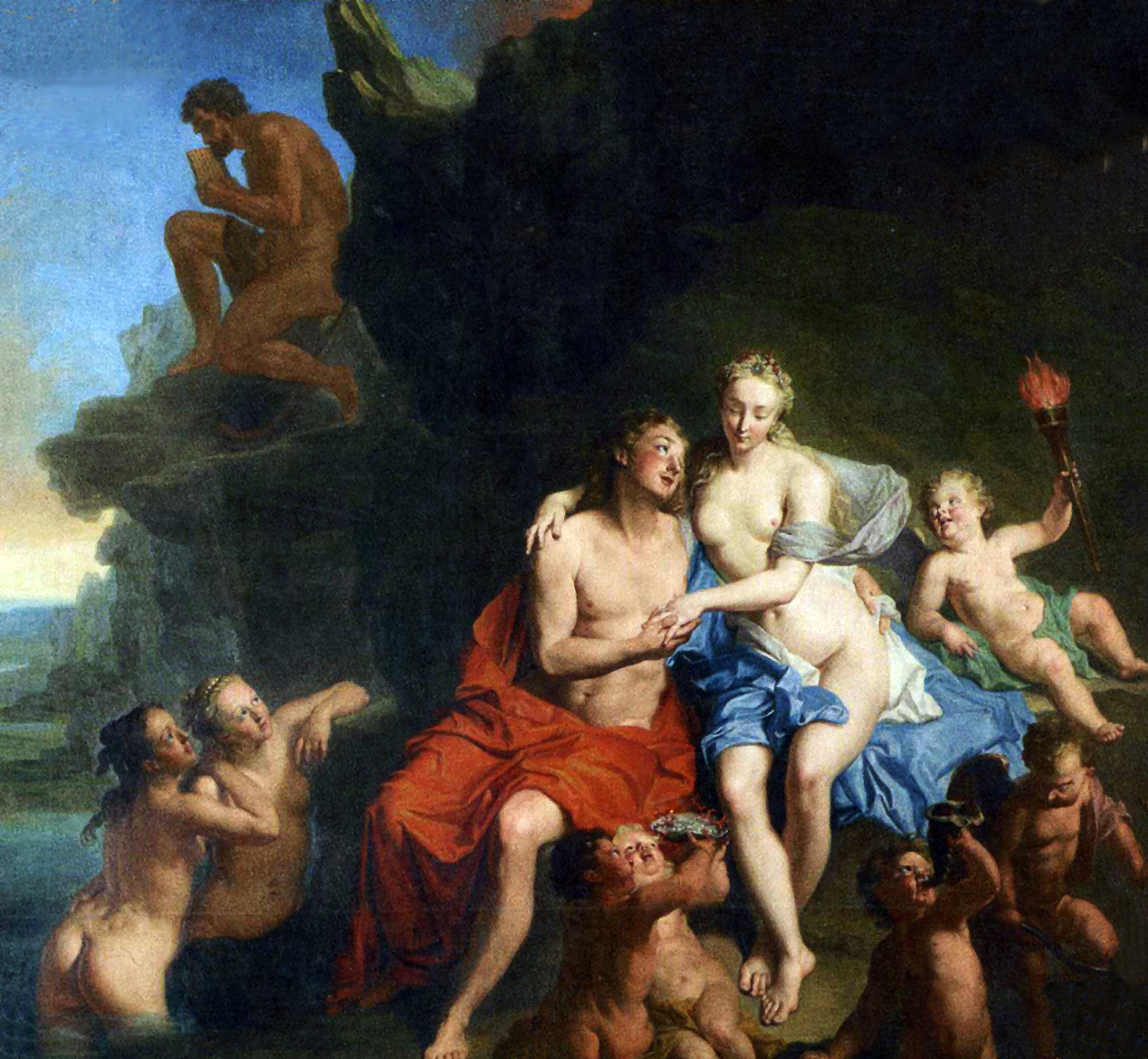
Acis und Galatea, by Jacob van Schuppen (c. 1730)

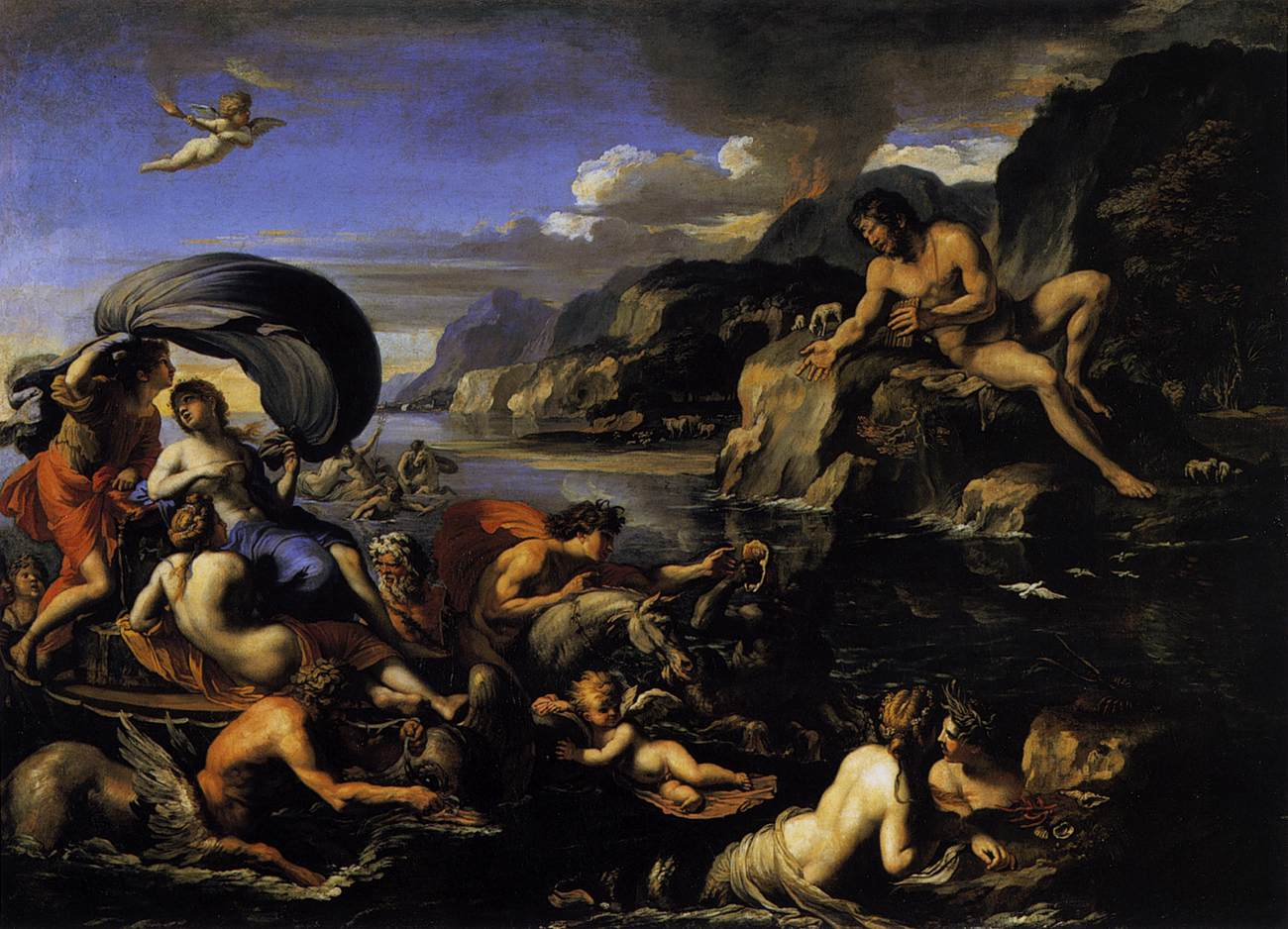
Acis, Galatea, and Polyphemus, by François Perrier (1645–1650)

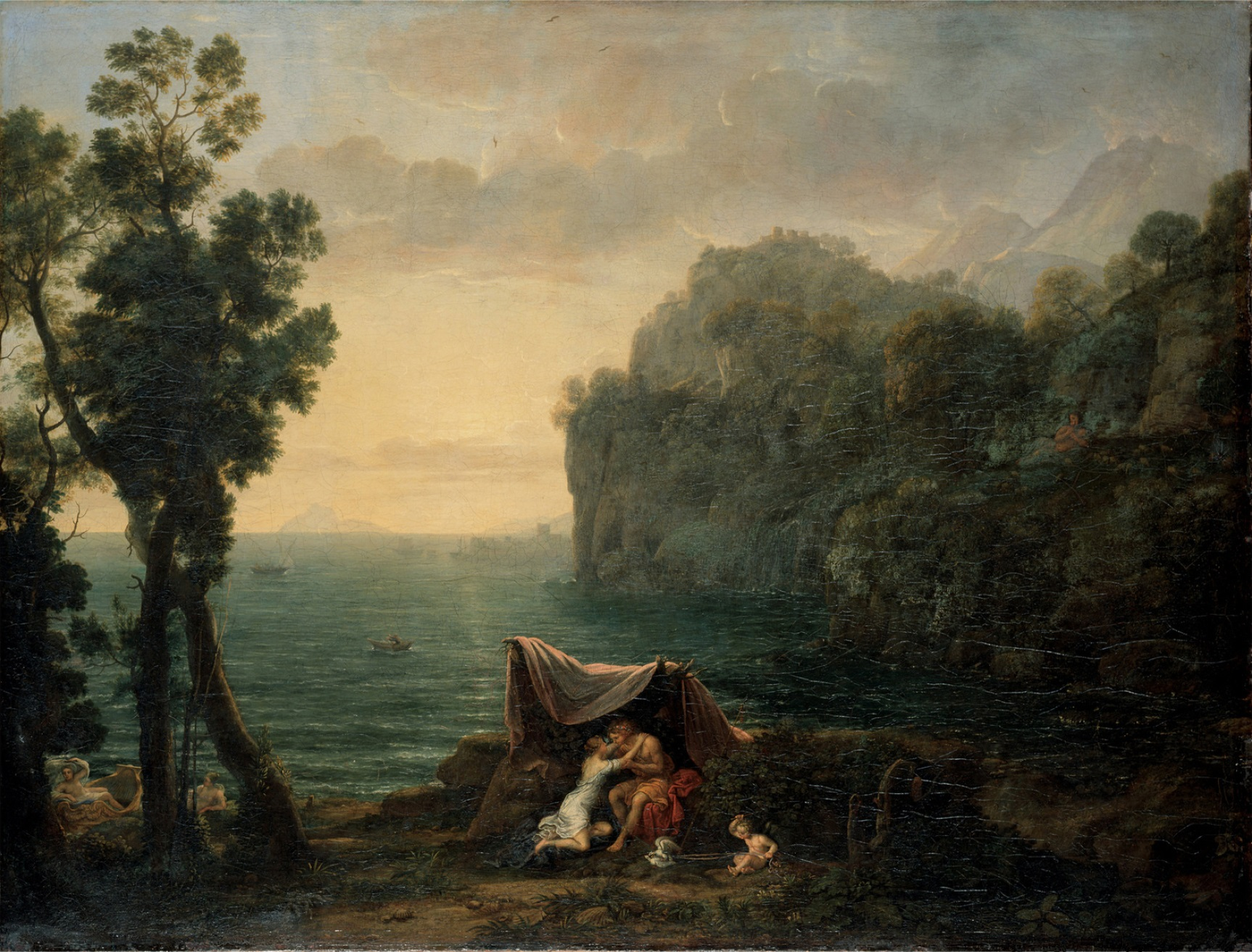
Coastal landscape with Acis and Galatea, by Claude Lorrain (1657)

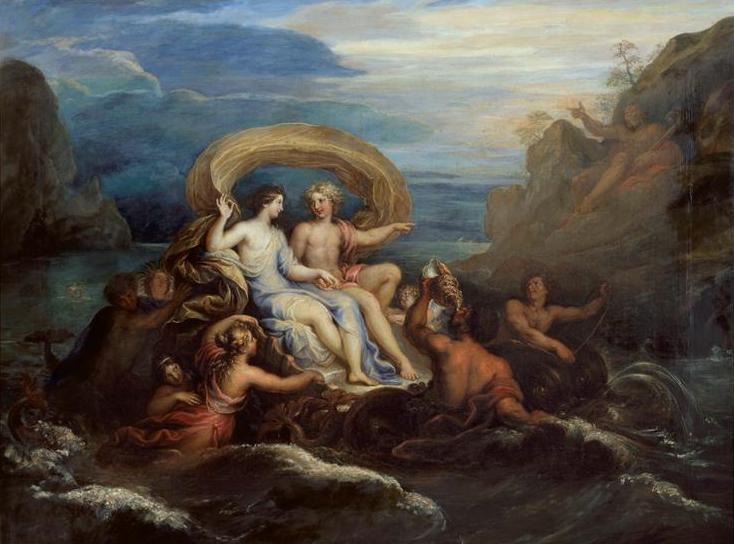
Acis and Galatea, by Michel Corneille

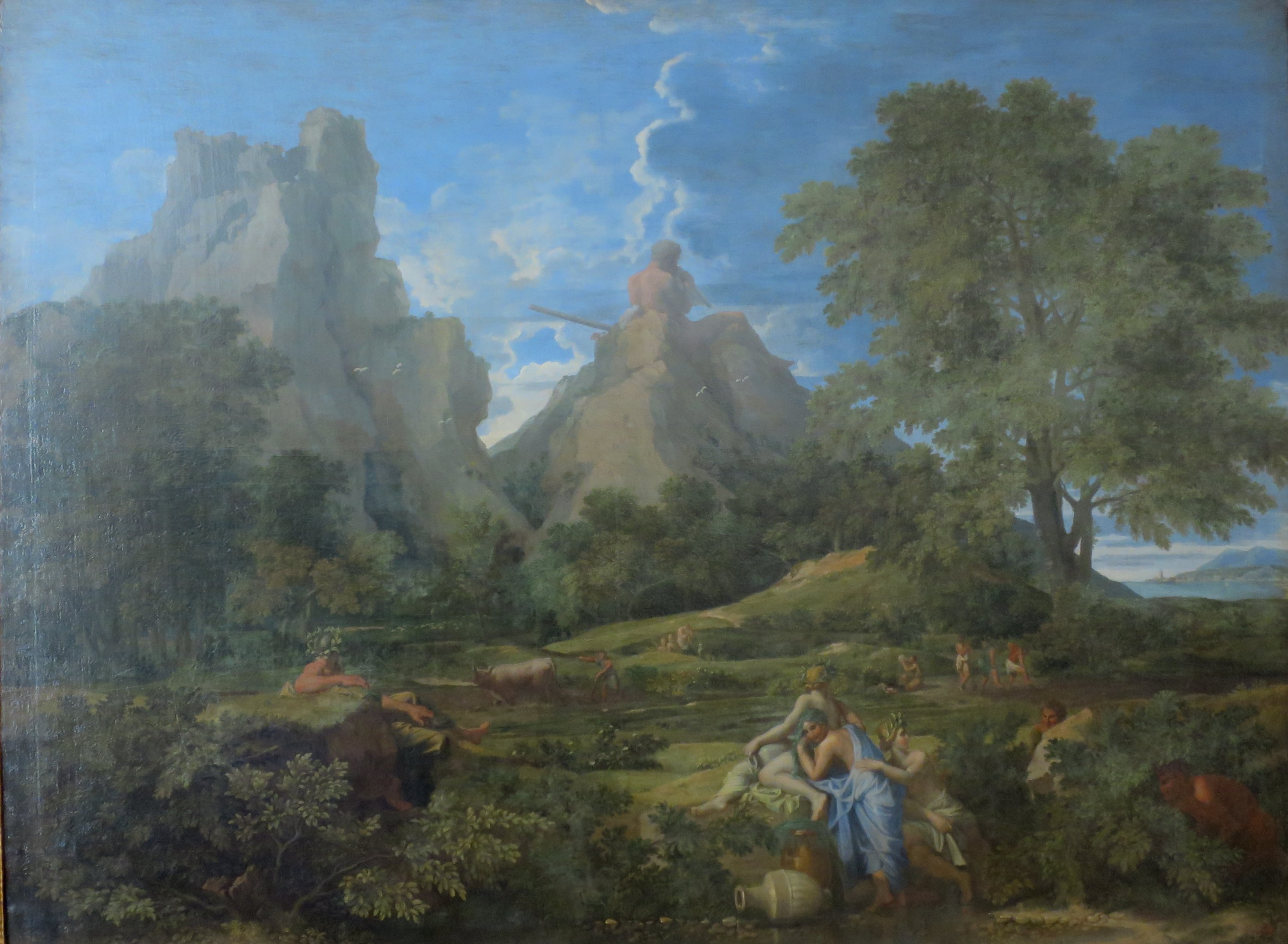
Landscape with Polyphemus, by Nicolas Poussin

Paintings featuring Acis and Galatea can be grouped according to their themes. Most notably the story takes place within a pastoral landscape in which the figures are almost incidental. This is particularly so in Nicolas Poussin's Landscape with Polyphemus (1649)(Hermitage Museum) and Claude Lorrain's seaside landscape (Dresden) of 1657, in both of which the lovers play a minor part in the foreground. In an earlier painting by Poussin (National Gallery of Ireland, 1630) the couple is among several embracing figures in the foreground, shielded from view of Polyphemus, who is playing his flute higher up the slope.

In all of these Polyphemus is somewhere in the background, but many others feature Galatea alone, as in Perino del Vaga's painting of her being drawn by sea beasts over the waves while riding on a seashell. Generally, though, the nymph is carried through the sea by adoring attendants in paintings generally titled The Triumph of Galatea, of which the most renowned treatment is by Raphael. In general these follow the 3rd-century description given of such a painting by Philostratus the Younger in his Imagines:

The nymph sports on the peaceful sea, driving a team of four dolphins yoked together and working in harmony; and maiden-daughters of Triton, Galatea's servants, guide them, curving them in if they try to do anything mischievous or contrary to the rein. She holds over her heads against the wind a light scarf of sea-purple to provide a shade for herself and a sail for her chariot, and from it a kind of radiance falls upon her forehead and her head, though no white more charming than the bloom on her cheek; her hair is not tossed by the breeze, for it is so moist that it is proof against the wind. And lo, her right elbow stands out and her white forearm is bent back, while she rests her fingers on her delicate shoulder, and her arms are gently rounded, and her breasts project, nor yet is beauty lacking in her thigh. Her foot, with the graceful part that ends in it, is painted as on the sea and it lightly touches the water as if it were the rudder guiding her chariot. Her eyes are wonderful, for they have a kind of distant look that travels as far as the sea extends.

In those cases where the rejected lover Polyphemus appears somewhere ashore, the division between them is emphasised by their being identified with their respective elements, sea, and land. Typical examples of this were painted by Francois Perrier, Giovanni Lanfranco and Jean-Baptiste van Loo.

Sensual portrayals of the lovers embracing in a landscape were provided by French painters especially, as in those by Charles de La Fosse (c. 1700), Jean-François de Troy, and Alexandre Charles Guillemot (1827). Polyphemus lurks in the background of these and in the example by De Troy his presence plainly distresses Galatea. Other French examples by Antoine Jean Gros (1833) and Édouard Zier (1877) show the lovers hiding in a cave and peering anxiously out at him.

They anticipate the tragic moment when he looms menacingly over the pair, having discovered the truth they have tried to conceal. The threat is as apparent in Jean-Francois de Troy's softly outlined 18th-century vision as it is in Odilon Redon's almost Surrealist painting of 1900. The brooding atmosphere in these suggests the violent action which is to follow. That had been portrayed in earlier paintings of Polyphemus casting a rock at the fleeing lovers, such as those by Annibale Carracci, Auger Lucas, and Carle van Loo.

=== Sculpture ===
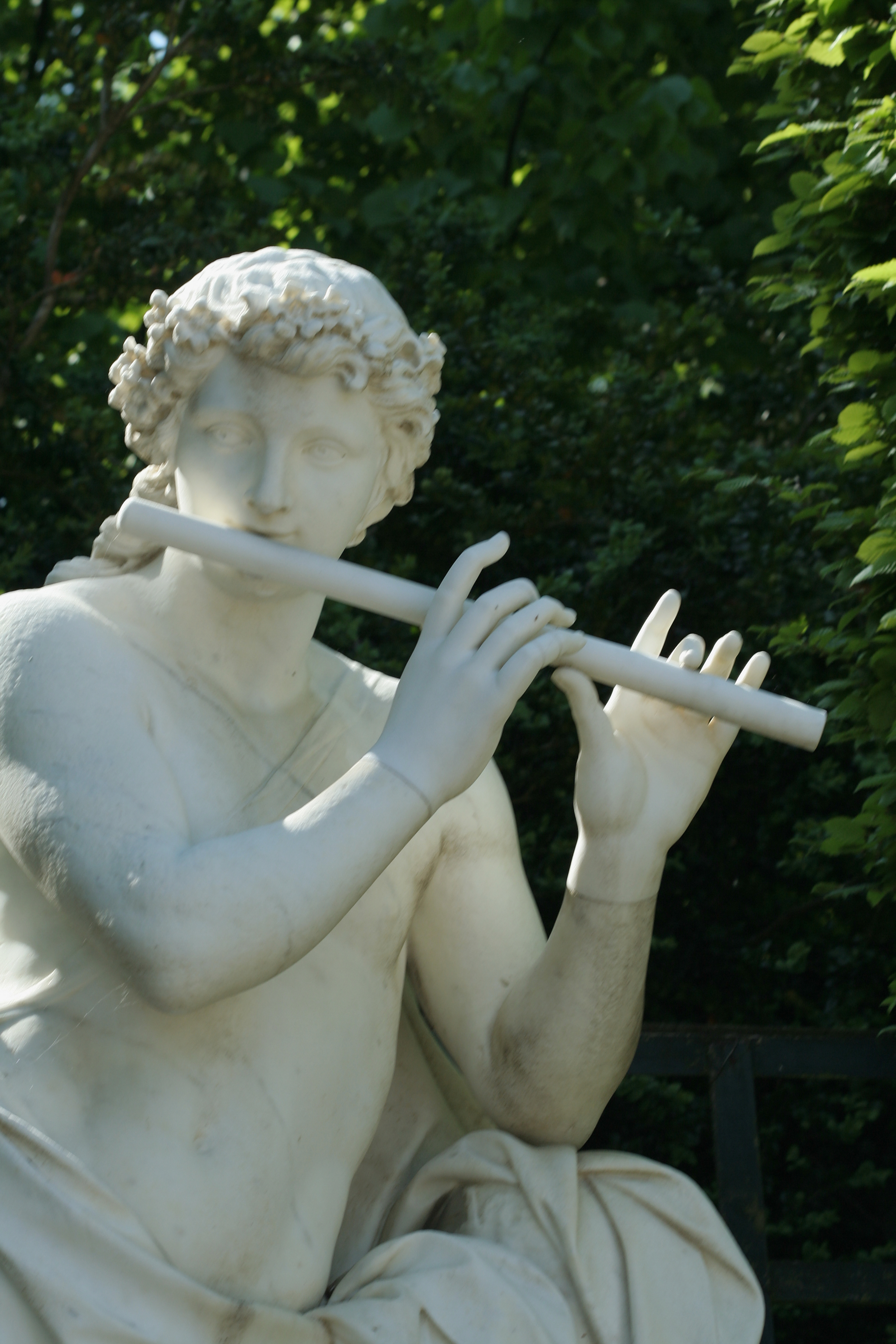
Acis playing the flute by Jean-Baptiste Tuby

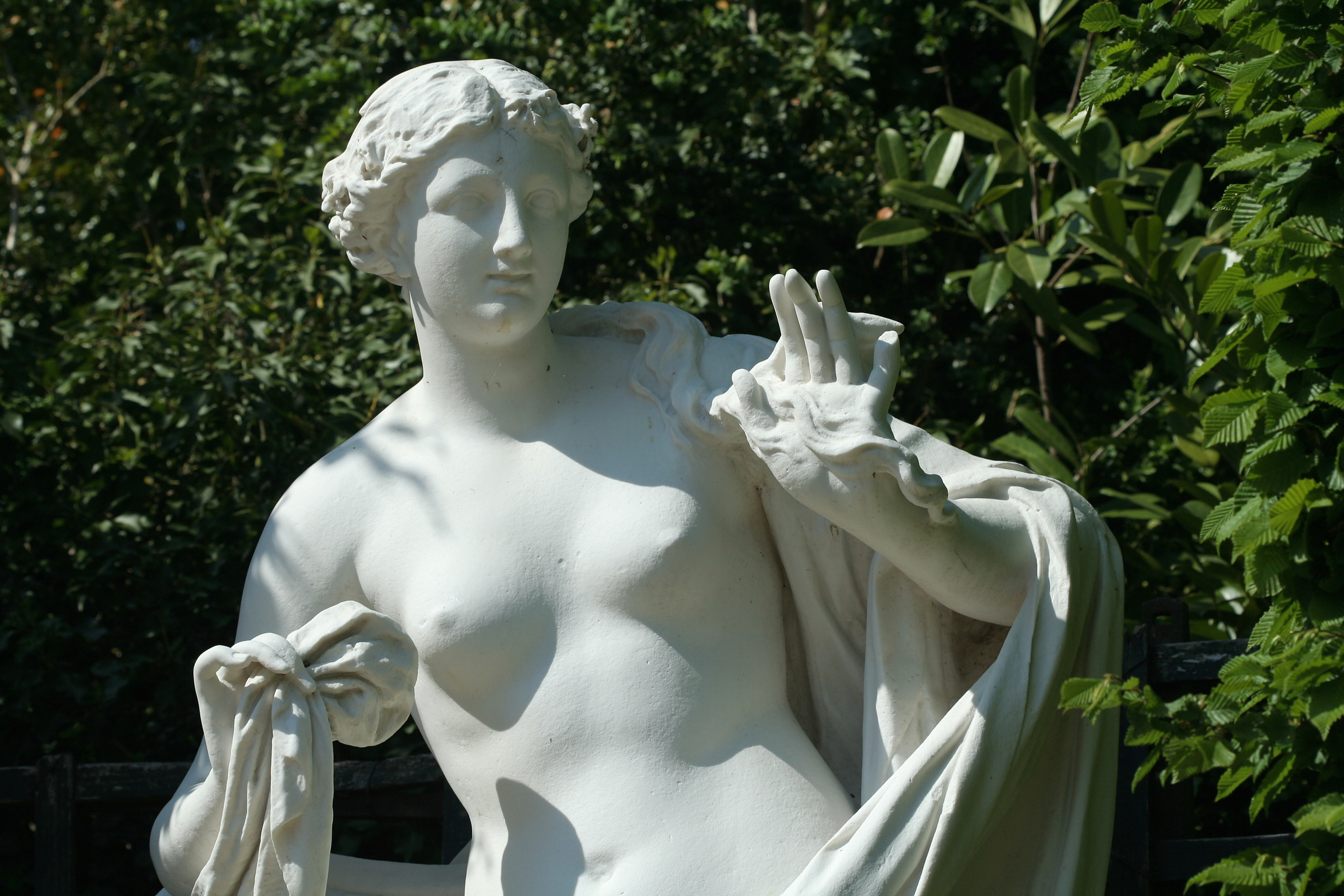
Galatea in the Gardens of Versailles

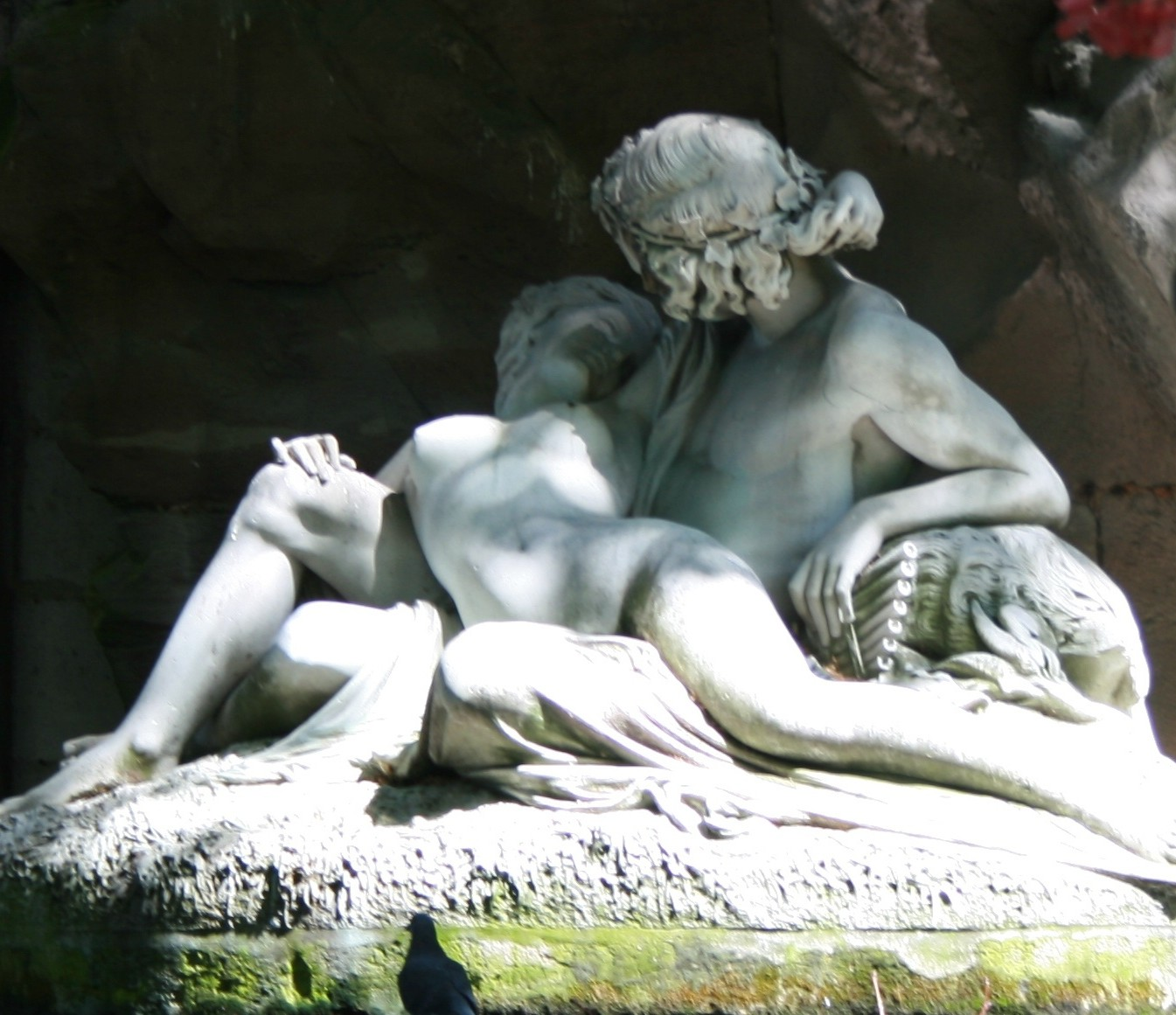
The lovers embrace on the Medici Fountain, Paris

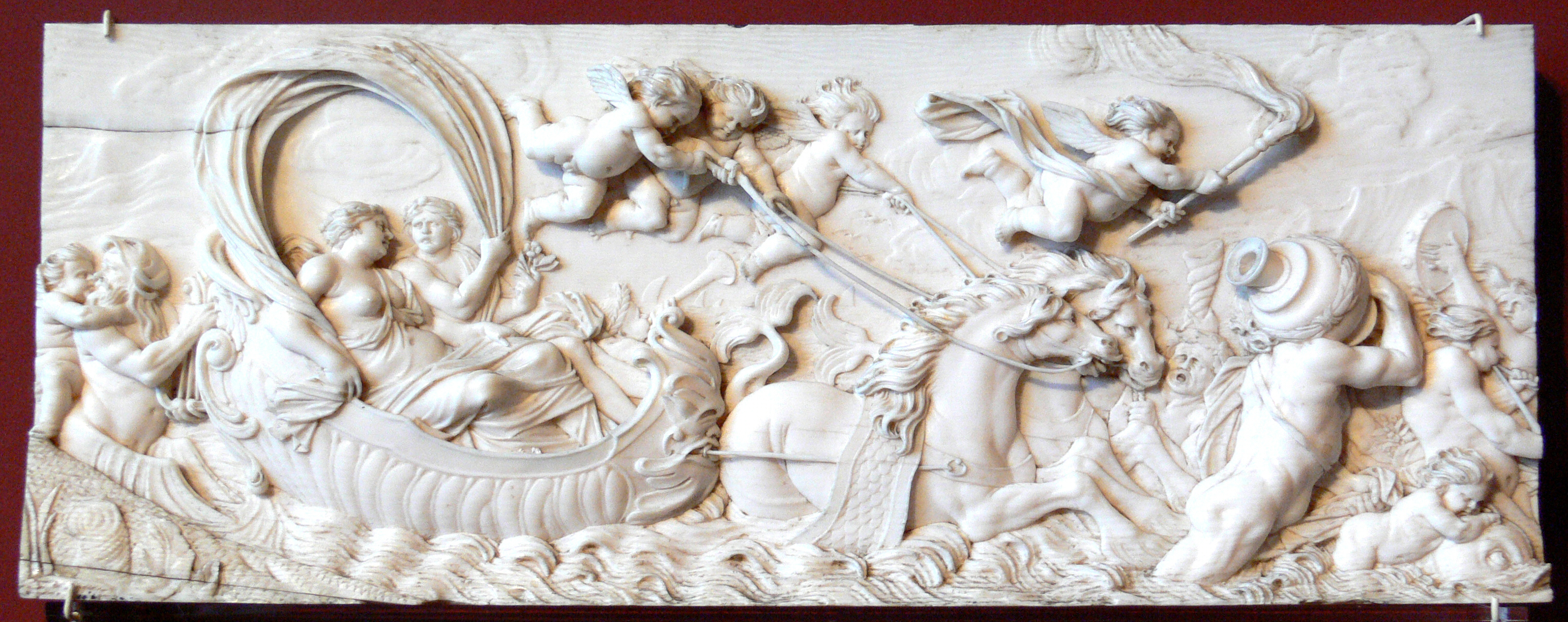
The lovers drawn over the sea, 17th-century German ivory carving

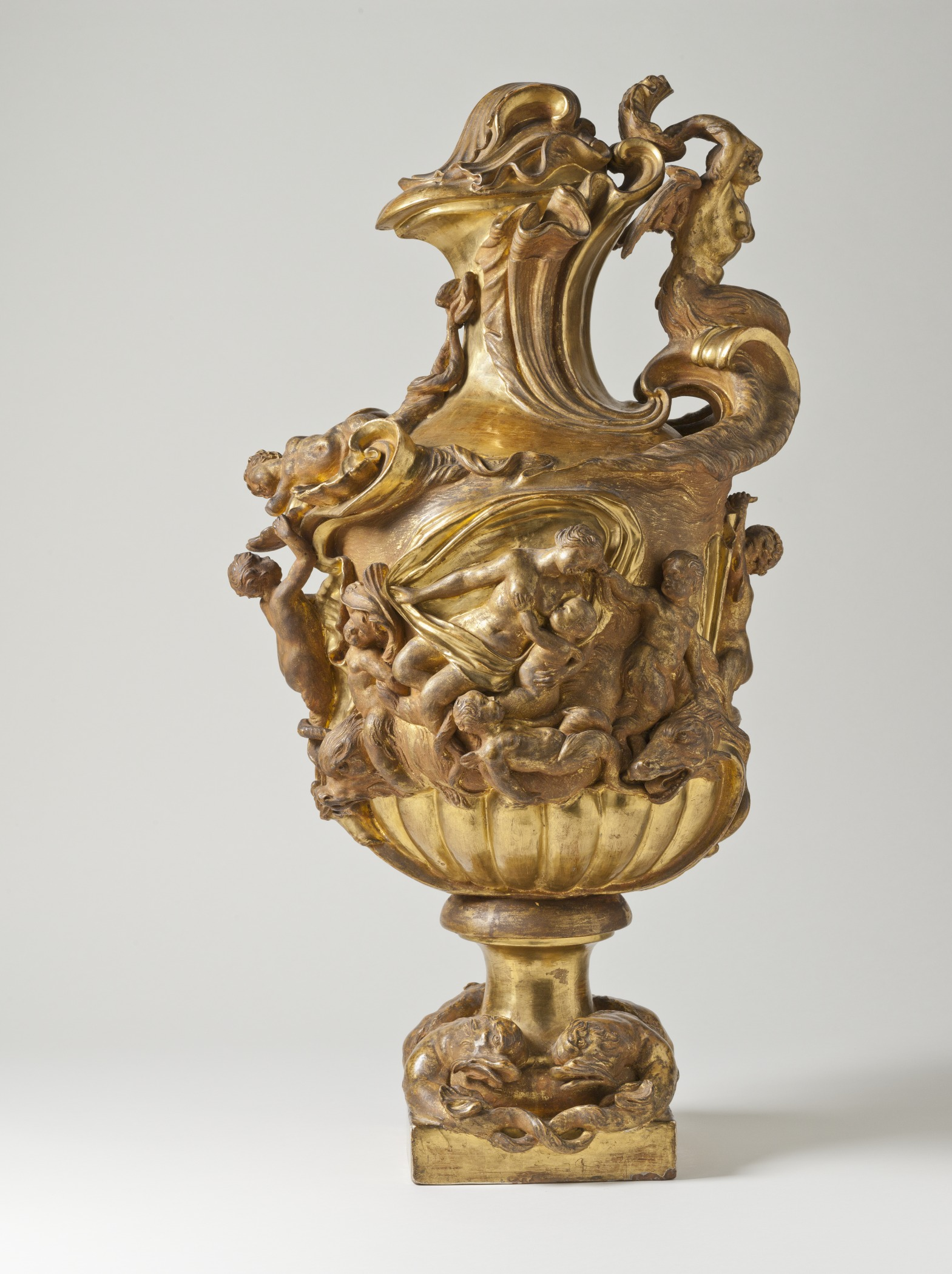
An Italian vase decorated with the Triumph of Galatea

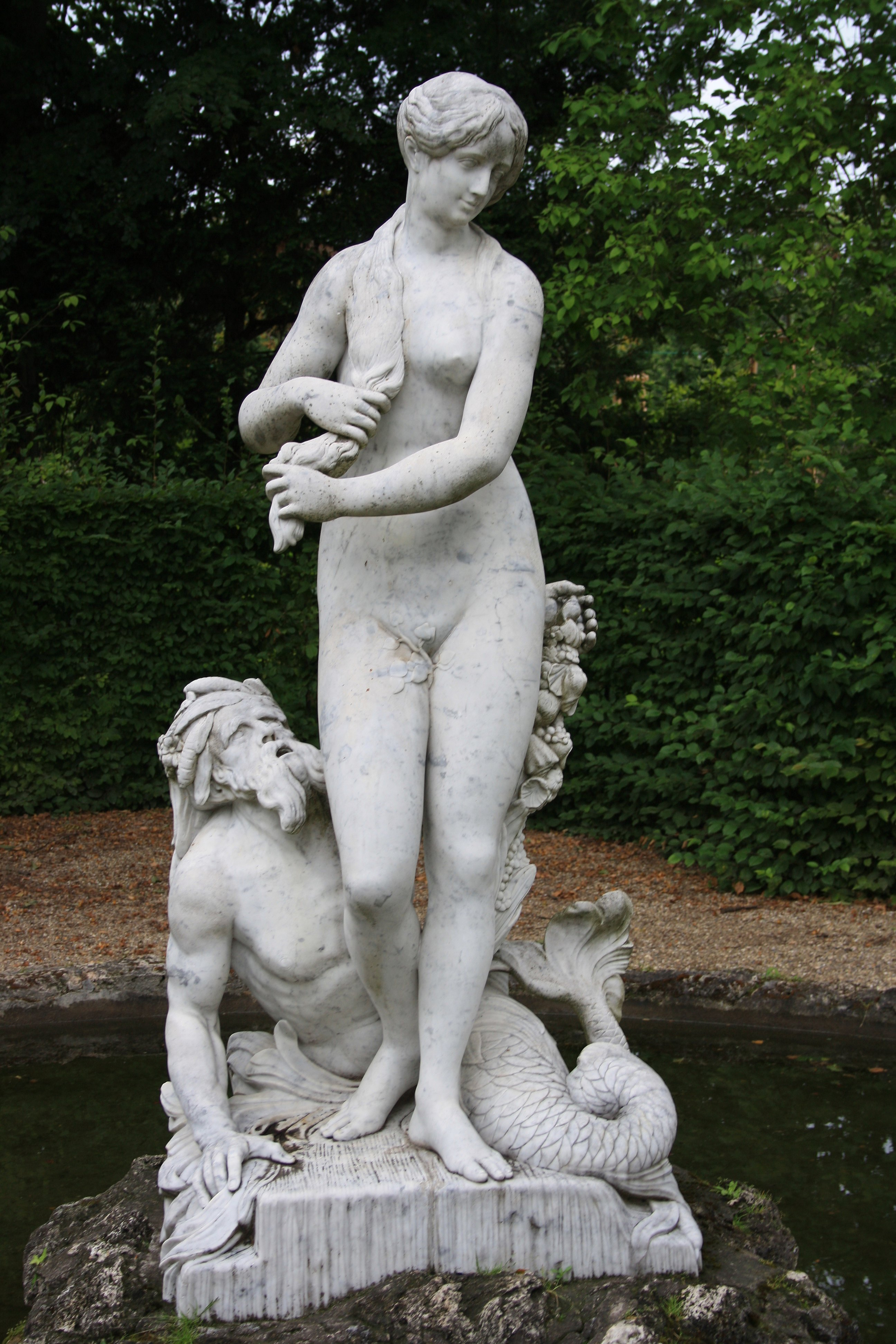
Gabriël Grupello's statue at Schwetzingen Palace

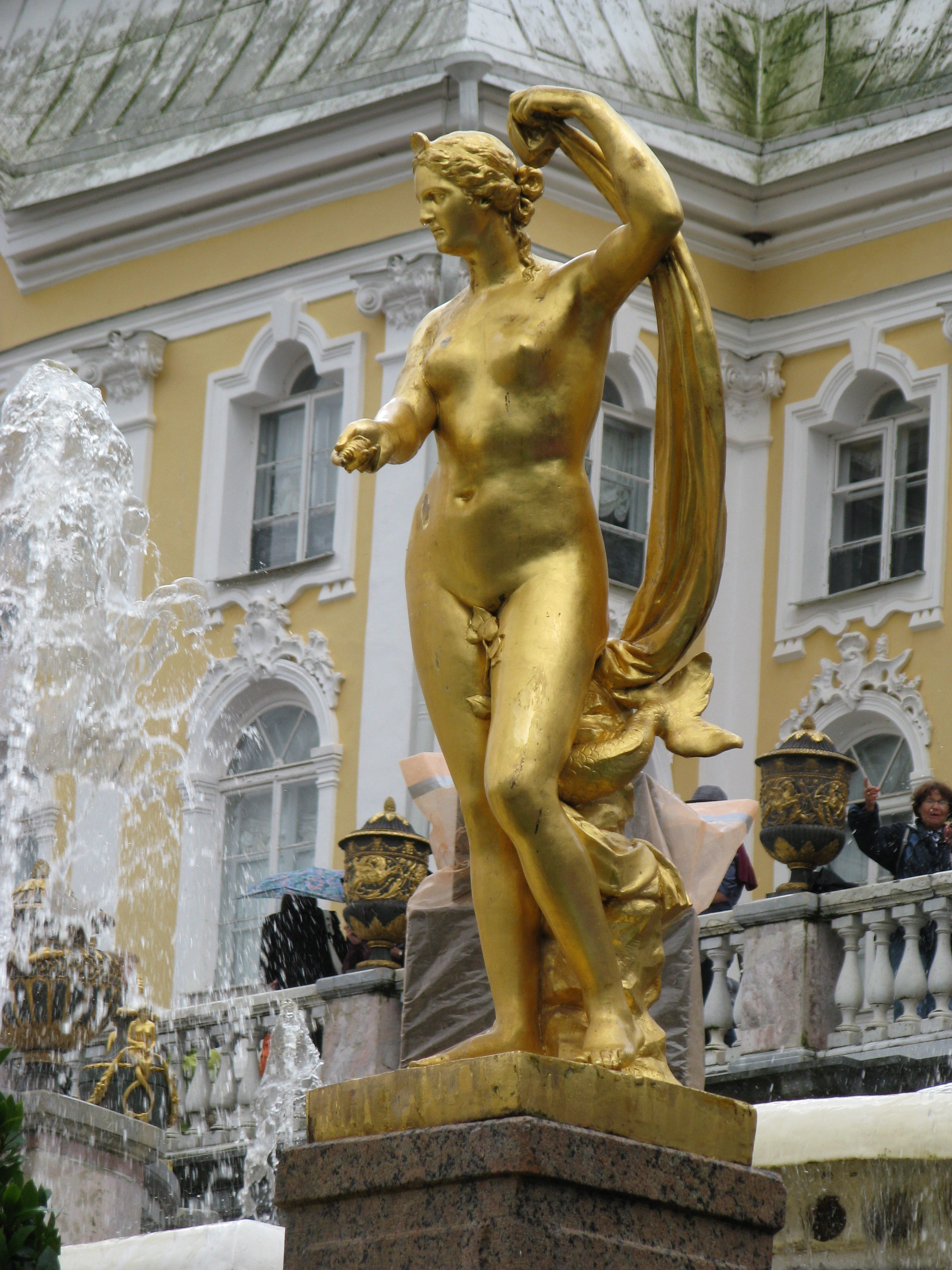
Nicola Michetti's statue at the Peterhof Palace

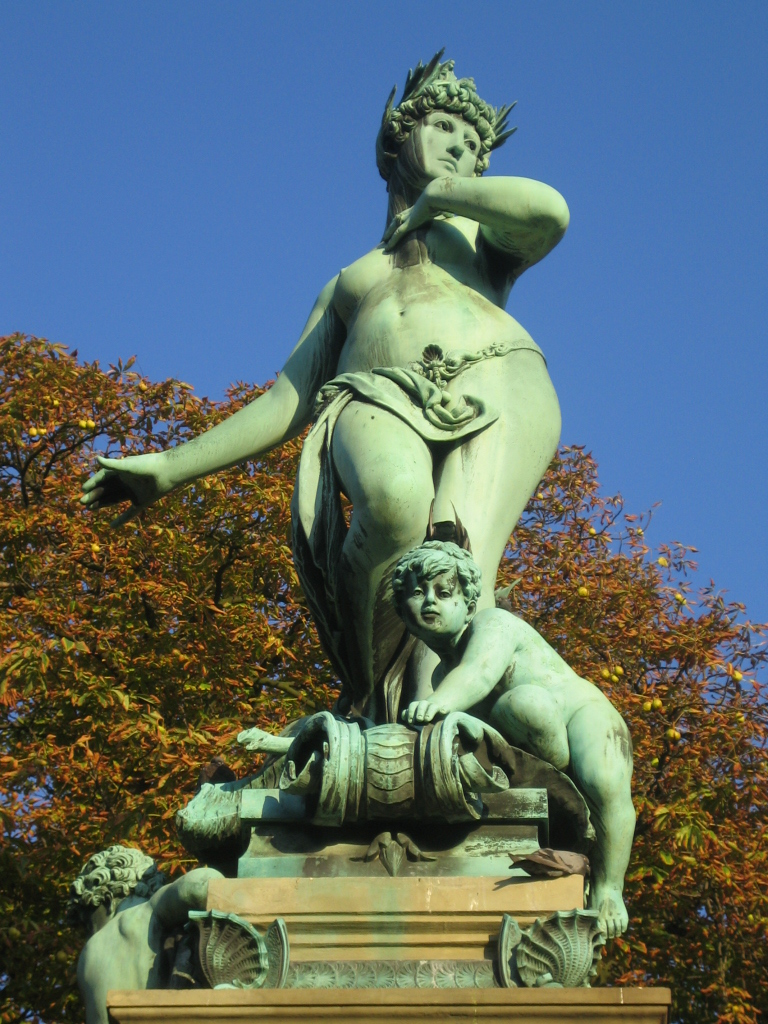
Galatea at the head of the Galatea water well, Stuttgart

Statues of Galatea, sometimes in the company of Acis, began to be made in Europe from the 17th century. There is a fanciful description of a fountain that incorporates them both in John Barclay's Latin novel Argenis, dating from 1621:

Being drawn to the top of the fountain, the water passed through many pipes in various forms, then falling into the cistern beneath, it boiled with the force of its falling and waxed green like the sea. In the midst whereof, Galatea, as in the sea, bewailed her newly dead Acis, who lay on the shore, and as if he now began to be dissolved into a river, he sent forth two streams, one at his mouth, the other at his wound.

Common features of statues depicting Galatea include, one raised hand holding a billowing scarf; sea imagery, including shells, dolphins and tritons; and often the fact that the statue is incorporated into a fountain. In the work by Gabriel de Grupello in the castle park at Schwetzingen, the triton at Galatea's feet holds up a garland threaded with shells and pearls. The Galatea in the grounds of Tsarskoye Selo in Russia has sea pearls threaded into her hair. There is also a statue of her by Nicola Michetti that forms part of the cascade at the Peterhof Palace in St Petersburg. These features can help distinguish statues of Galatea from the Galatea involved in the myth of Pygmalion.

One statue by a pool in the public gardens of Acireale, the Sicilian town where the transformation of Acis is supposed to have taken place, depicts Acis lying beneath the boulder that has killed him while Galatea crouches to one side. She has raised an arm to heaven in supplication. Another statue sculpted by Jean-Baptiste Tuby is located in the Bosquet des Dômes in the Versailles gardens. The statue depicts Acis leaning on a rock, playing the flute, as the half-clad Galatea comes upon him with hands lifted in surprise (1667–75). A similar gesture is displayed in the statue of her alone in the fountain to the right of the great staircase at Château de Chantilly. The lovers are portrayed together as part of the Medici Fountain in the Luxembourg Garden in Paris. Designed by Auguste Ottin in 1866, the marble group embrace inside a grotto while above them is crouched a huge Polyphemus in weathered bronze, peering down in jealousy.

The nymph reclines on a large shell carried by tritons in the 18th-century fountain at the Villa Borromeo Visconti Litta in Milan. It is on the back of a dolphin that she reclines in the statue by the 19th-century Italian sculptor Leopoldo Ansiglioni (1832–1894). There are two versions of this, one at the centre of a fish pool in the East House of the University of Greenwich's Winter Gardens, and a later copy installed at Hearst Castle in California. In this, one of the arms bent back to support her head is encircled by the dolphin's tail. There is also a German fountain by Karl Friedrich Moest now installed in Karlsruhe in which Galatea sits on the back of a triton. Over her head she balances the huge shell from which the water pours. Another statue was erected at the head of an impressive cascade in Stuttgart's Eugenplatz. A work of Otto Rieth (1858–1911) dating from 1890 features the nymph crowned with seaweed and surging up from the dolphin and young cupids playing at her feet. In the applied arts, three-dimensional representations of Raphael's triumph theme were often incorporated into artifacts for aristocratic use and were painted on majolica ware.
