= Deiochos of Proconnesus =

Ancient Greek logographer

Deiochos or Deilochos (in Greek: Δηίοχος) was an Ionian logographer from Proconnesus. According to Dionysius of Halicarnassus, he lived before the Peloponnesian War, likely in the 5th century BC.

Nothing is known about his life and very little about his work. It appears he wrote a chronicle of the city of Cyzicus and Bithynia in general, titled 'About Cyzicus,' in which he narrated incidents of the Argonautic Expedition that took place in the region.

Among other things, he mentioned the boxing match between Amykos, the mythical giant king of the Bebryces in Bithynia, and the Argonaut Polydeuces, which ended in the latter's victory. Deiochos also compiled a list of the Argonauts, including the name of Amphiaraus.

In another surviving fragment, he mentions that Cleite, the wife of King Cyzicus, died of grief and that her tears formed a spring in the city of Cyzicus named after her.

His work was an important source of information for later historians and poets, such as Apollonius of Rhodes. Only a few fragments have survived.
