= Amycus (disambiguation) =

Amycus is a mythical king of the Bebryces.

Amycus or Amykos may also refer to:

== Greek mythology ==
- Amycus (centaur), a centaur who fought the Lapiths
- Amycus (mythology), various mythological figures with the name Amycus
- Amycos Satyrykos, a lost play by Sophocles

== Other uses ==
- Amycus (Bithynia), a town on the Bosporus
- Amycus (spider), a genus of jumping spiders
- Amycus Carrow, a fictional character in the Harry Potter series
- USS Amycus (ARL-2), a ship of the US Navy during World War II
- 55576 Amycus, an asteroid
