= Pelodes =

In Antiquity, Pelodes (Ancient Greek: Πηλώδης) or Palodes (Ancient Greek: Παλῶδες) was a site that cannot be identified with any certainty. One obscure Palodes was a minor port site on the eastern side of the Bosporus, about halfway up, a little south of Amycus.

A reference to another Palodes is in Plutarch's De defectu oraculorum ("Obsolescence of Oracles") of which a common reading is that the Greek god Pan is dead. During the reign of Tiberius (AD 14-37), Plutarch records, the news of Pan's death came to one Thamus, a sailor on his way to Italy by way of the islands of Paxi. A divine voice hailed him across the salt water, "Thamus, are you there? When you reach Palodes, take care to proclaim that the great god Pan is dead." Which Thamus did, and the news was greeted from shore with groans and laments. But see Pan (mythology).

In Plutarch's context, Epitherses was sailing up the western coast of Greece, presumably intending to cross to Italy once he reached Corfu, following a standard Roman sea-route between Italy and Greece. The ship had already drifted from the Echinades (near Ithaca) up to Paxi. Strabo (7.7.5) mentions "the mouth of the so-called Pelodes Limen (Ancient Greek: Πηλώδης λιμήν, lit. 'muddy harbor') as the location of Buthrotum (modern Butrint in southern Albania, opposite the northern end of Corfu.

Pelodes Limen is generally agreed to be either the Channel of Vivari, or the Butrint lagoon. Indeed, the marshy landscape around Butrint would have been known to merchants and travellers for centuries. Epirus has high rainfall, and the river system from the mountains across the Vrina Plain would have brought down soil, leaving great muddy fans exuding from the mouth of the Vivari Channel into the Straits of Corfu.
