= USS Amycus =

Achelous-class landing craft repair ship

- USS Amycus (ARL-2) off San Francisco, 10 August 1943. Note the 3-inch/50-caliber gun on the extreme stern with the Bofors 40 mm L/60 gun quad mount just forward of and above it.

History

United States
- Name: Amycus
- Namesake: King Amykos
- Ordered: as a Type S3-M-K2 hull, MCE hull 1009
- Builder: Permanente Metals Corporation, Richmond, California
- Yard number: 44
- Laid down: 17 January 1943
- Launched: 2 April 1943
- Commissioned: 30 July 1943
- Decommissioned: 15 November 1946
- Reclassified: Landing Craft Repair Ship, 13 January 1943
- Stricken: 1 June 1970
- Identification: Hull symbol: ARL-2; IMO number: 8645624; Code letters: NJQW
- Honors and awards: 2 × battle stars
- Fate: Sold for scrapping, 13 August 1971

General characteristics
- Class & type: Achelous-class repair ship
- Displacement: 3,900 long tons (4,000 t) (light); 4,100 long tons (4,200 t) (full load)
- Length: 328 ft (100 m)
- Beam: 50 ft (15 m)
- Draft: 11 ft 2 in (3.40 m)
- Installed power: 2 × Electro-Motive Diesel 12-567A diesel engines; 1,800 shp (1,300 kW)
- Propulsion: 1 × Falk main reduction gears; 2 × Propellers
- Speed: 12 kn (22 km/h; 14 mph)
- Complement: 22 officers, 233 enlisted men
- Armament: 1 × 3-inch (76 mm)/50 caliber dual-purpose gun 2 × quad 40 millimetres (1.57 in) Bofors anti-aircraft (AA) guns 6 × twin 20 millimetres (0.79 in) Oelikon AA cannons

Service record
- Part of: United States Seventh Fleet (1943-46)
- Operations: Battle of Hollandia (27 April–1 June 1944); Lingayen Gulf landings (7–18 January 1945)
- Awards: Navy Unit Commendation; American Campaign Medal; Asiatic–Pacific Campaign Medal; World War II Victory Medal; Philippine Liberation Medal

USS Amycus (ARL-2) was one of 39 Achelous-class landing craft repair ships built for the United States Navy during World War II. Named for Amycus (in Greek mythology, the son of Poseidon and Melia), she was the only US Naval vessel to bear the name.

== Construction ==
Originally projected as LST-489, an LST-1-class tank landing ship, this ship was redesignated ARL-2 and named Amycus on 13 January 1943. She was laid down on 17 January 1943, under Maritime Commission (MARCOM) contract, MC hull 1009, by Kaiser Shipyards, Yard No. 4, Richmond, California; launched on 2 April 1943; delivered on 3 June 1943, to the Matson Navigation Company, San Francisco, for conversion to a landing craft repair ship; and commissioned on 30 July 1943.

== Service history ==
Amycus conducted shakedown training along the California coast before departing San Diego on 20 September 1943, and heading for the South Pacific to join the Service Forces of the US 7th Fleet. She made port calls at Pago Pago, American Samoa; Nouméa, New Caledonia; Brisbane and Port of Townsville, Australia; and Milne Bay, New Guinea. On 29 November, the vessel arrived at Buna, Papua New Guinea where she joined Task Force 76 (TF 76). She remained at Buna until late April 1944, servicing and repairing small escort vessels and landing boats.

On 25 April 1944, Amycus got underway for Cape Cretin, New Guinea, where she joined a convoy bound for Hollandia. She reached that base on 3 May, and assumed duty as a repair ship and the flagship of the landing craft control officer. The ship remained in Humboldt Bay through the summer and autumn carrying out repair and tender services for various landing craft. On 20 December, Amycus left Hollandia and proceeded to Seeadler Harbor, Manus Island. A week later, she sortied with a task group destined to take part in the Lingayen Gulf landings. As her convoy crossed the South China Sea, there were numerous air raid alerts, but only one attack materialized. On 7 January 1945, two enemy planes came in low to attack. One was shot down by a screening vessel, and the other broke off her approach and escaped undamaged.

Amycus anchored in Lingayen Gulf on 9 January, and the bombardment of the Luzon beaches began at 07:00 that day. Shortly thereafter, the ship began repairing battle-damaged landing craft. During the Allied assault, Amycus fired intermittently at enemy aircraft. While at anchor on 29 January, a friendly plane accidentally jettisoned a bomb which exploded about 60 ft (18 m) off her port quarter. Shrapnel from the explosion killed three and wounded nine crew members and caused minor damage to the repair ship's hull.

Amycus remained in Lingayen Gulf through 26 June, when she sailed for Subic Bay in the Philippine Islands. Upon her arrival there, the ship operated under Service Squadron 3 at the naval base at Subic Bay. The Japanese surrender in August found Amycus still providing services at Subic Bay. She remained there until 27 October, when she shaped a course for the United States.

== Post-war service ==
The ship reached San Francisco on 30 November 1945, and later steamed to Portland, Oregon. Decommissioned on 15 November 1946, she joined the Pacific Reserve Fleet in the Columbia River. Her name was struck from the Navy list on 1 June 1970. She was sold for scrap on 13 August 1971, to Zidell Explorations, Inc., of Portland.

== Awards ==
Amycus earned two battle stars for her World War II service.

== Bibliography ==
- "Amycus". Dictionary of American Naval Fighting Ships. Naval History and Heritage Command. 16 June 2015.
- "Kaiser Permanente No. 4, Richmond CA". ShipbuildingHistory.com. 5 February 2014.
- "USS Amycus (ARL-2)". NavSource. 26 August 2016.
