= Labours of Hercules =

Series of feats carried out by Heracles

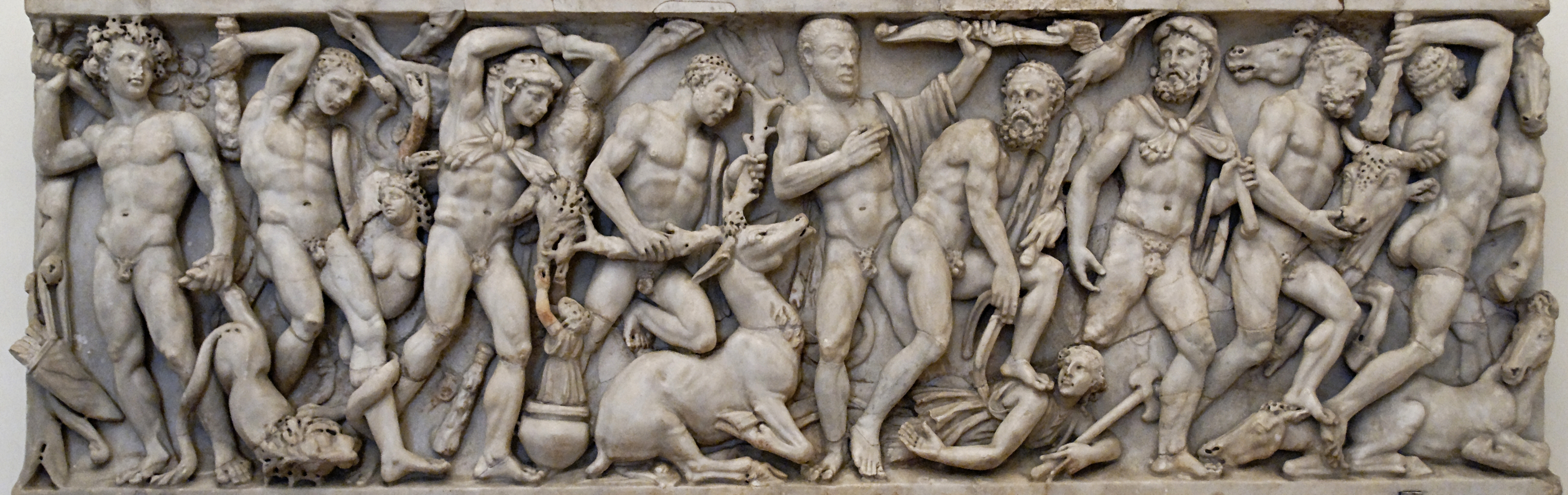
Roman relief (3rd century AD) depicting a sequence of the Labours, representing from left to right the Nemean lion, the Lernaean Hydra, the Erymanthian boar, the Ceryneian Hind, the Stymphalian birds, the Girdle of Hippolyta, the Augean stables, the Cretan Bull and the Mares of Diomedes

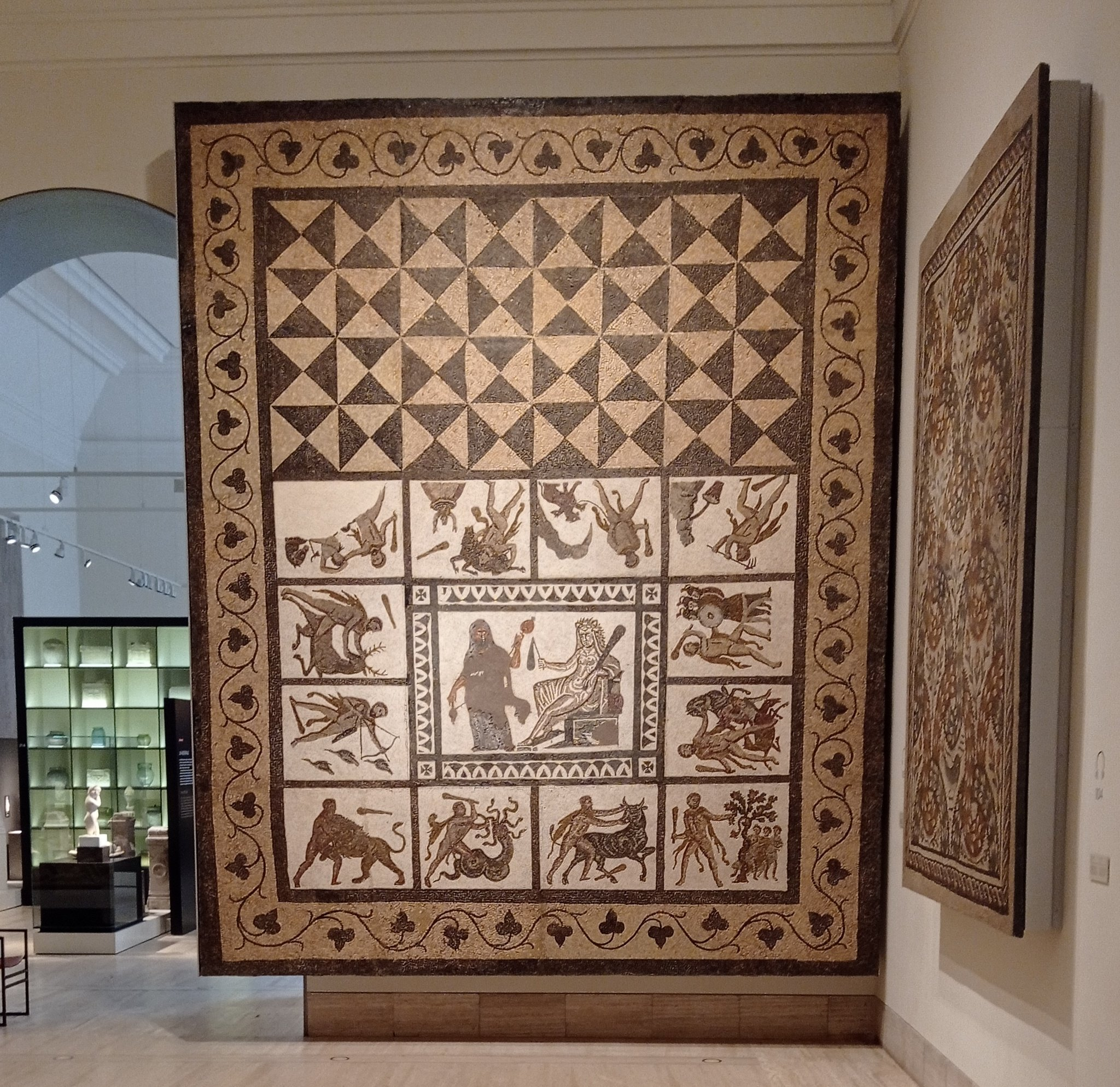
Roman mosaic (3rd century CE) showing the Twelve Labours from Llíria (Valencia, Spain). Now in the Museo Arqueológico Nacional.

The Labours of Hercules or Labours of Heracles (Ancient Greek: ἆθλοι, âthloi, Latin: Labores) are a series of tasks carried out by Heracles, the greatest of the Greek heroes, whose name was later romanised as Hercules. They were accomplished in the service of King Eurystheus. The episodes were later connected by a continuous narrative.

The establishment of a fixed cycle of twelve labours (known as the Dodekathlos) was attributed by the Greeks to an epic poem, now lost, written by Peisander (7th to 6th centuries BC).

Having tried to kill Heracles ever since he was born, Hera induced a madness in him that made him kill his wife and children. Afterwards, Heracles went to the Oracle of Delphi to atone, where he prayed to the god Apollo for guidance. Heracles was told to serve Eurystheus, king of Mycenae, who sent him to perform a series of difficult feats, called labours.

== Background ==
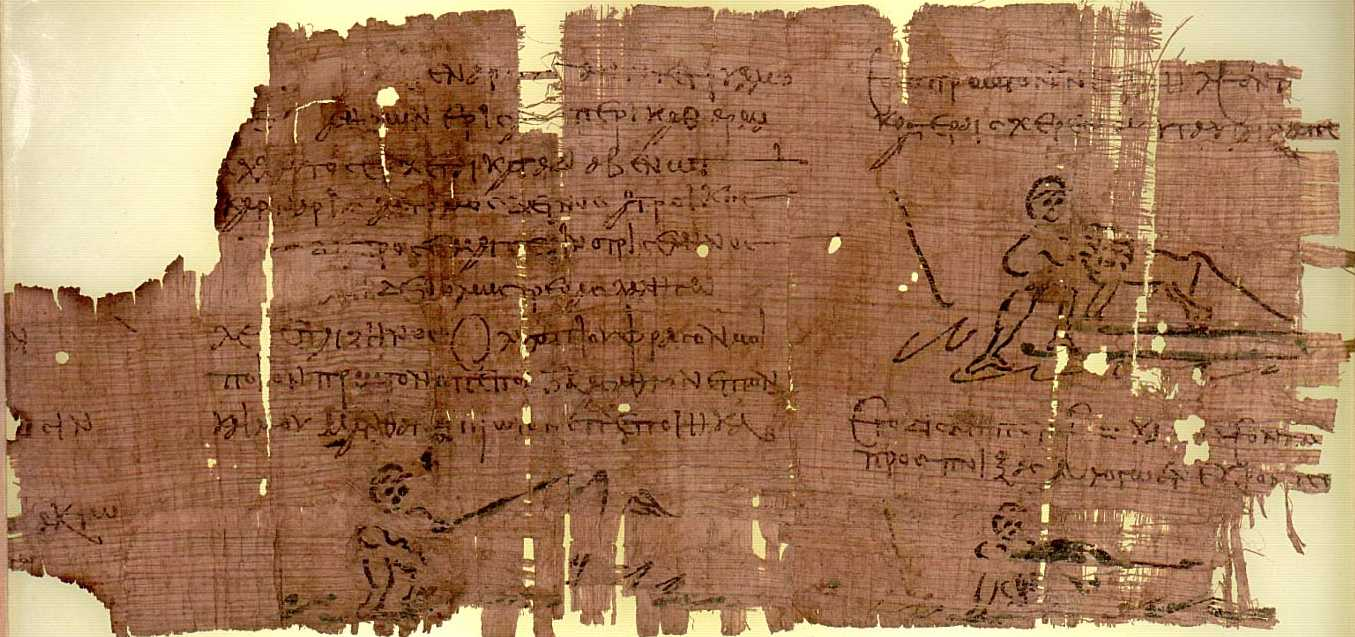
The Heracles Papyrus, a fragment of a 3rd-century CE Greek manuscript of a poem about the Labours of Heracles (Oxyrhynchus Papyrus 2331)

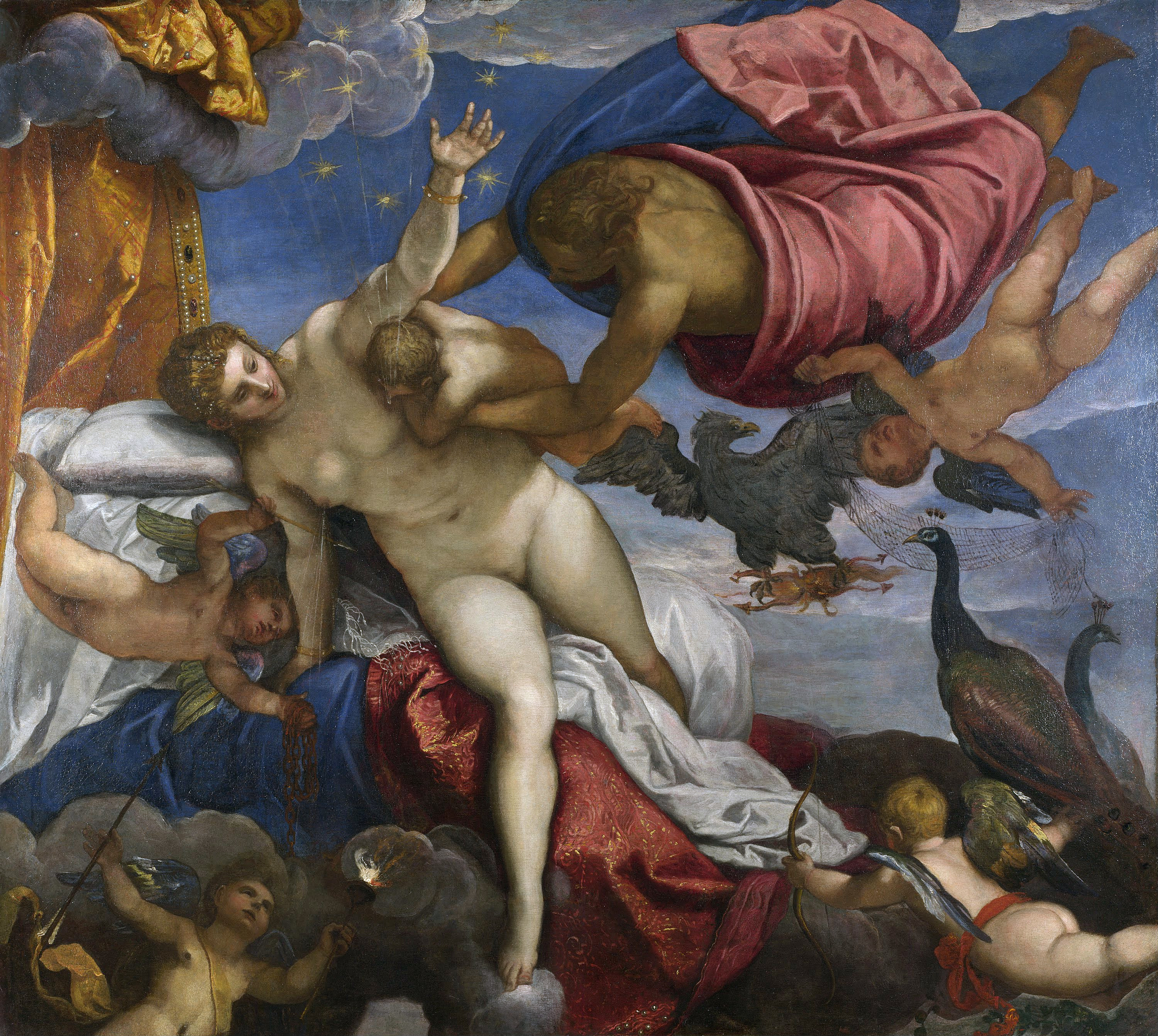
The Origin of the Milky Way by Jacopo Tintoretto, 1575

Heracles was the son born by the mortal woman Alcmene after her rape by Zeus, the king of the gods, who had disguised himself as her husband Amphitryon. Alcmene, fearing the jealousy of Zeus's wife Hera, exposed her infant son, who was taken by either Zeus or his daughter Athena (the protectress of heroes) to Hera, who did not recognize Heracles and nursed him out of pity. Heracles sucked so strongly that he caused Hera pain, and when she pushed him away, her milk sprayed across the heavens, forming the Milky Way. But with divine milk, Heracles had acquired supernatural strength. Either Zeus or Athena brought the infant back to his mother, and he was subsequently raised by his parents. The child was originally given the name Alcides by his parents; it was only later that he became known as Heracles in an unsuccessful attempt to mollify Hera, with Heracles meaning Hera's "pride" or "glory". He and his mortal twin, Iphicles, were just eight months old when Hera sent two giant snakes into the children's chamber. Iphicles cried from fear, but his twin brother grabbed a snake in each hand and strangled them. He was found by his nurse playing with them on his cot as if they were toys. Astonished, Amphitryon sent for the seer Tiresias, who prophesied an unusual future for the boy, saying he would vanquish numerous monsters.

Ancient sources preserve multiple explanations as to why Heracles had to perform the labours. The earliest literary reference to the labours, in the Iliad, presents Heracles's servitude to his cousin Eurystheus as part of his fate, set in place by the machinations of Hera. The goddess fooled Zeus into making an oath that anyone born on that day would have dominion over their neighbours. She then ensured Eurystheus was born that day and Heracles was not, by manipulating their mothers' pregnancies. According to the mythographer Apollodorus, Heracles murdered his children and those of his half-brother Iphicles in a fit of madness induced by Hera. After recovering his sanity, he was purified by King Thespius in Thespiai. He then sought out the oracle of Delphi, who advised him to move to Tiryns and serve Eurystheus, completing the series of labours with which his cousin would task him. According to Euripides's play Herakles, Heracles committed to serving Eurystheus (who is the king of Argos) in exchange for permitting him and his family passage to Argolis. Euripides places Heracles's murderous episode after the conclusion of the labours. The attainment of immortality after completing the tasks is a motivating factor in Diodorus Siculus's account, where Heracles is notified of this possibility by the Delphic oracle; this also appears as an ancillary reason in Apollodorus's version.

== The twelve labours ==
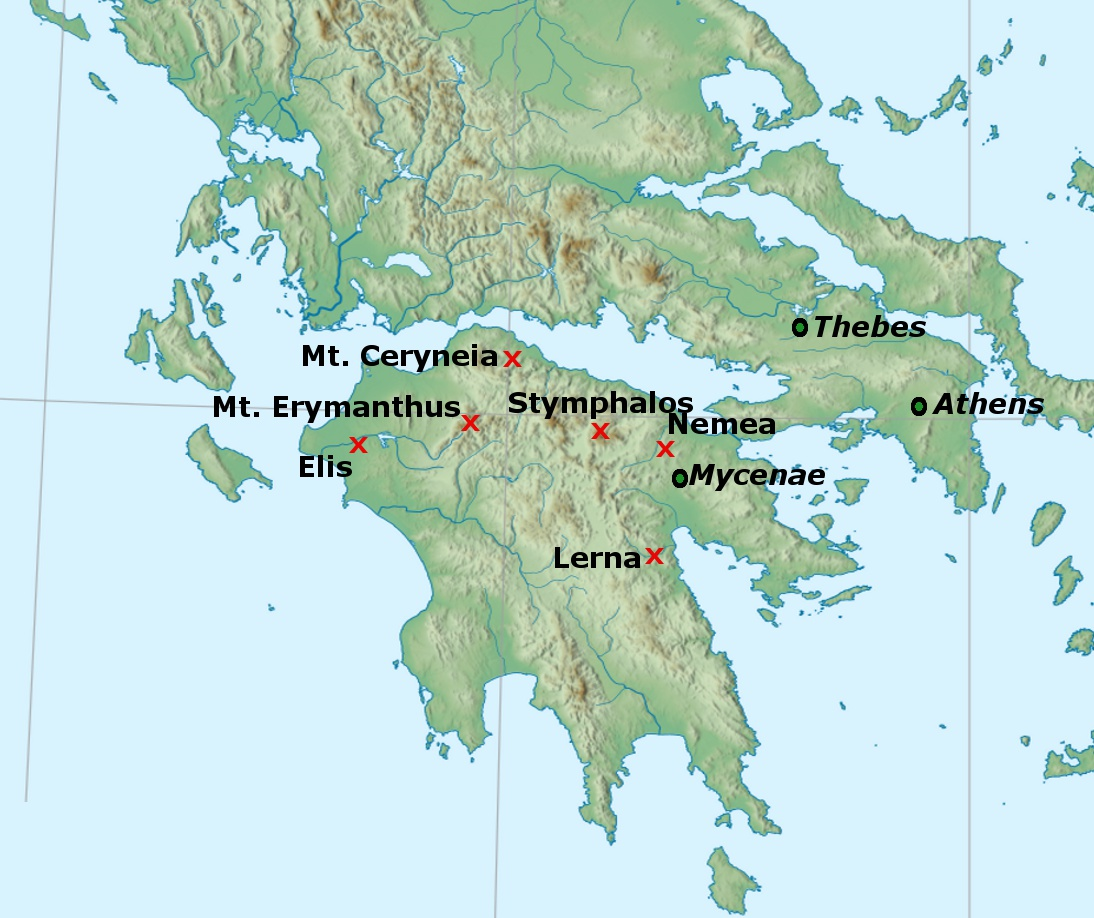
Heracles's first six labours were located in the Peloponnese.

Of the twelve labours performed by Heracles, six were located in the Peloponnese, culminating with the rededication of Olympia. Six others took the hero farther afield, to places that were, according to Ruck and Staples, "all previously strongholds of Hera or the 'Goddess' and were entrances to the Netherworld". In each case, the pattern was the same: Heracles was sent to kill or subdue, or to fetch back for Eurystheus (as Hera's representative) a magical animal or plant.

A famous depiction of the labours in Greek sculpture is found on the metopes of the Temple of Zeus at Olympia, which date to the 460s BC.

According to Apollodorus but not other traditions, the oracle at Delphi told Heracles to perform just ten labours to Eurystheus's orders, but after Heracles accomplished these tasks, Eurystheus refused to recognize two: the slaying of the Lernaean Hydra, as Heracles's nephew and charioteer Iolaus had helped him; and the cleansing of the Augean stables, because Heracles accepted payment for the labour (in other versions, it was the Stymphalian Birds that were discounted instead of the Augean stables for the help of Athena giving Heracles bronze rattles). Eurystheus thus set two more tasks (fetching the golden apples of the Hesperides and capturing Cerberus) which Heracles also performed, bringing the total number of tasks to twelve.

The order of the labours given by the mythographer Apollodorus is:

1. Slaying the Nemean lion
2. Slaying the nine-headed Lernaean Hydra
3. Capturing the Ceryneian Hind
4. Capturing the Erymanthian Boar
5. Cleaning the Augean stables in a single day
6. Slaying the Stymphalian birds
7. Capturing the Cretan Bull
8. Stealing the Mares of Diomedes
9. Obtaining the belt of Hippolyta, queen of the Amazons
10. Obtaining the cattle of the three-bodied giant Geryon
11. Stealing three of the golden apples of the Hesperides
12. Capturing and bringing back Cerberus

Diodorus Siculus gives a similar sequence of the labours, though the orders of the third and fourth, fifth and sixth, and eleventh and twelfth labours are swapped.

=== First: Nemean lion ===
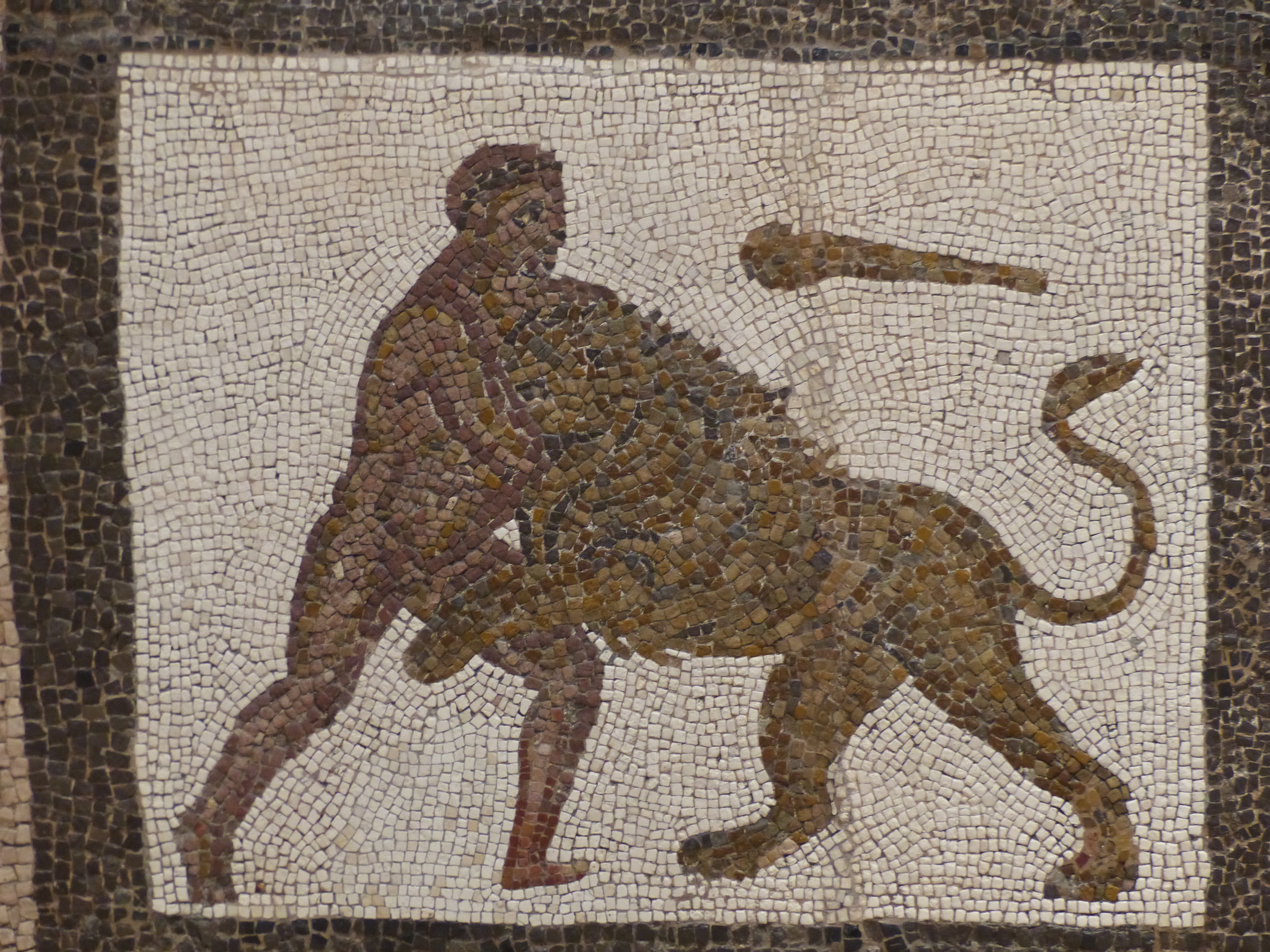
Heracles wrestling the Nemean lion. Detail of a Roman mosaic from Llíria (Valencia, Spain), 3rd century CE. Now in the Museo Arqueológico Nacional.

Heracles wandered in the area until he came to the town of Cleonae. There he met a boy who said that if Heracles slew the Nemean lion, (which had been raised by Hera and set upon the hills of Nemea), and returned within 30 days, the town would sacrifice a lion to Zeus, but if he did not return within 30 days or if he died, the boy would sacrifice himself to Zeus. Another version claims that he met Molorchos, a shepherd who had lost his son to the lion, saying that if he came back within 30 days, a ram would be sacrificed to Zeus. If he did not return within 30 days, it would be sacrificed to the dead Heracles as a mourning offering.

While searching for the lion, Heracles fletched some arrows to use against it, not knowing that its golden fur was impervious to projectiles. When he found and shot the lion using his bow, Heracles discovered the fur's protective property as the arrow bounced harmlessly off the creature's thigh. After some time, Heracles made the lion return to his cave. The cave had two entrances, one of which Heracles blocked; he then entered the other. In those dark and confined quarters, Heracles stunned the beast with his club and, using his immense strength, strangled it to death. During the fight, the lion bit off one of his fingers. Others say that he shot arrows at it, eventually shooting it in the vulnerable mouth. After slaying the lion, he tried to skin it with a knife from his belt, but failed. He then tried sharpening the knife with a stone and even tried using the stone itself. Finally, Athena, noticing the hero's plight, told Heracles to use one of the lion's own claws to skin the pelt. Others say that Heracles's armor was, in fact, the hide of the Lion of Cithaeron.

When he returned on the 30th day carrying the carcass of the lion on his shoulders, King Eurystheus was amazed and terrified. Eurystheus forbade him to ever again enter the city; from then on he was to display the fruits of his labours outside the city gates. Eurystheus would then tell Heracles his tasks through a herald, not personally. In the later Latin variants of the myth Eurystheus even had a large bronze jar made for himself in which to hide from Heracles if need be. Eurystheus then warned him that the tasks would become increasingly difficult.

=== Second: Lernaean Hydra ===
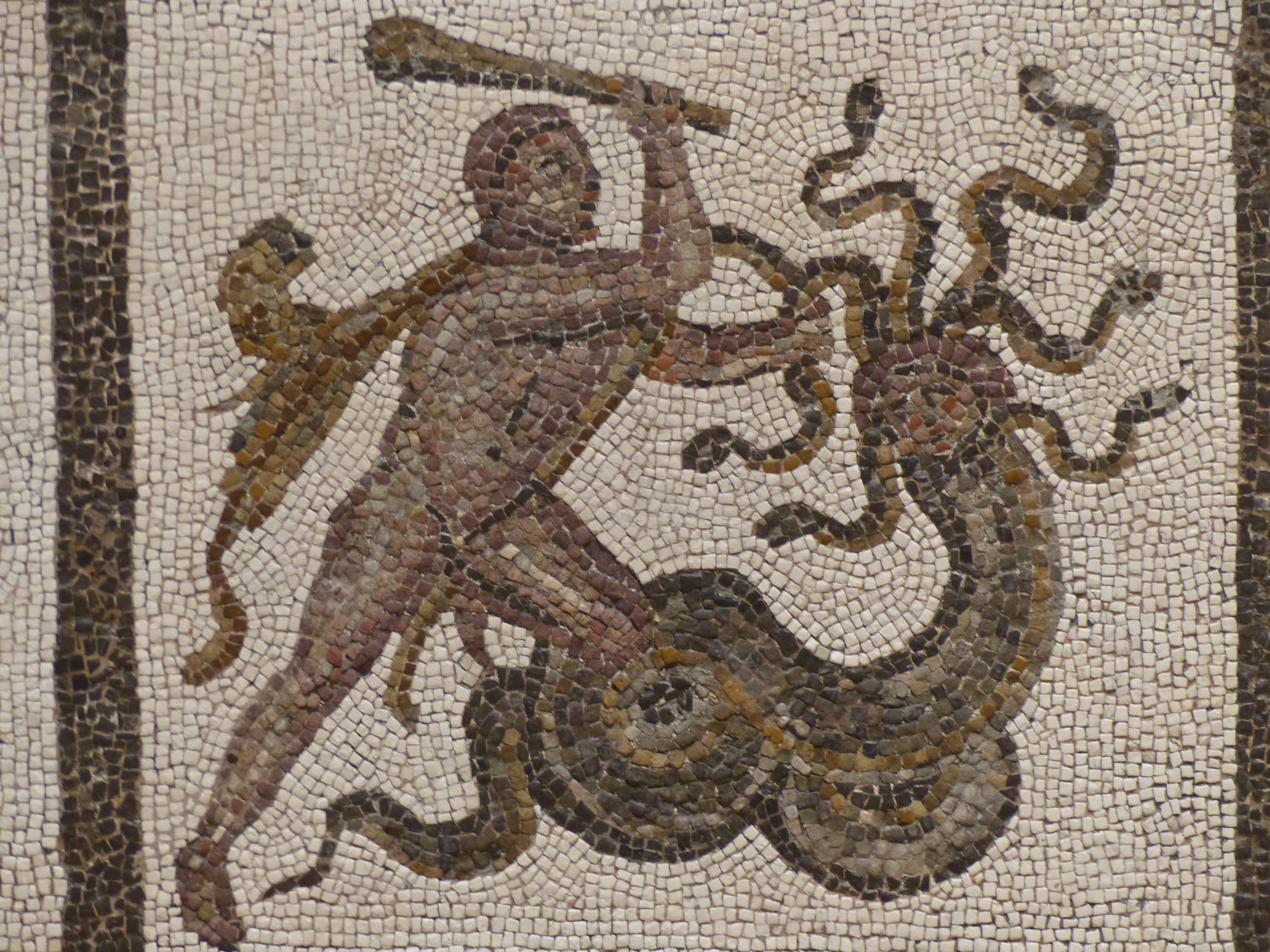
Heracles slaying the Lernaean Hydra. Detail of a Roman mosaic from Llíria (Valencia, Spain), 3rd century CE. Now in the Museo Arqueológico Nacional.

Heracles's second labour was to slay the Lernaean Hydra, a many-headed snake. Upon reaching the swamp near Lake Lerna, where the hydra dwelt, Heracles attacked the hydra's several heads, but each time one of its heads was removed, a new head (or two) would grow back. Additionally, during the fight, a giant crab came to assist the Hydra by biting Heracles on the foot. Heracles was able to kill the crab, but realizing that he could not defeat the hydra alone, he called on his nephew Iolaus (who had come with Heracles) for help. Working in tandem, once Heracles had removed a head (with his sword or club), Iolaus burned the stumps with a firebrand, preventing them from growing back. In such a way Heracles was able to kill the hydra, after which he dipped his arrows in the Hydra's poisonous blood. According to Apollodorus, one of the Hydra's (here nine) heads—the middle one—was immortal, so when Heracles cut off this head, Heracles buried it and placed a great rock on top of it.

Later, Heracles used one of his poisonous arrows to kill the centaur Nessus; and Nessus's tainted blood was applied to the Tunic of Nessus, by which the centaur had his posthumous revenge. Both Strabo and Pausanias report that the stench of the river Anigrus in Elis, making all the fish of the river inedible, was reputed to be due to the Hydra's venom, washed from the arrows Heracles used on the centaur.

=== Third: Ceryneian Hind ===
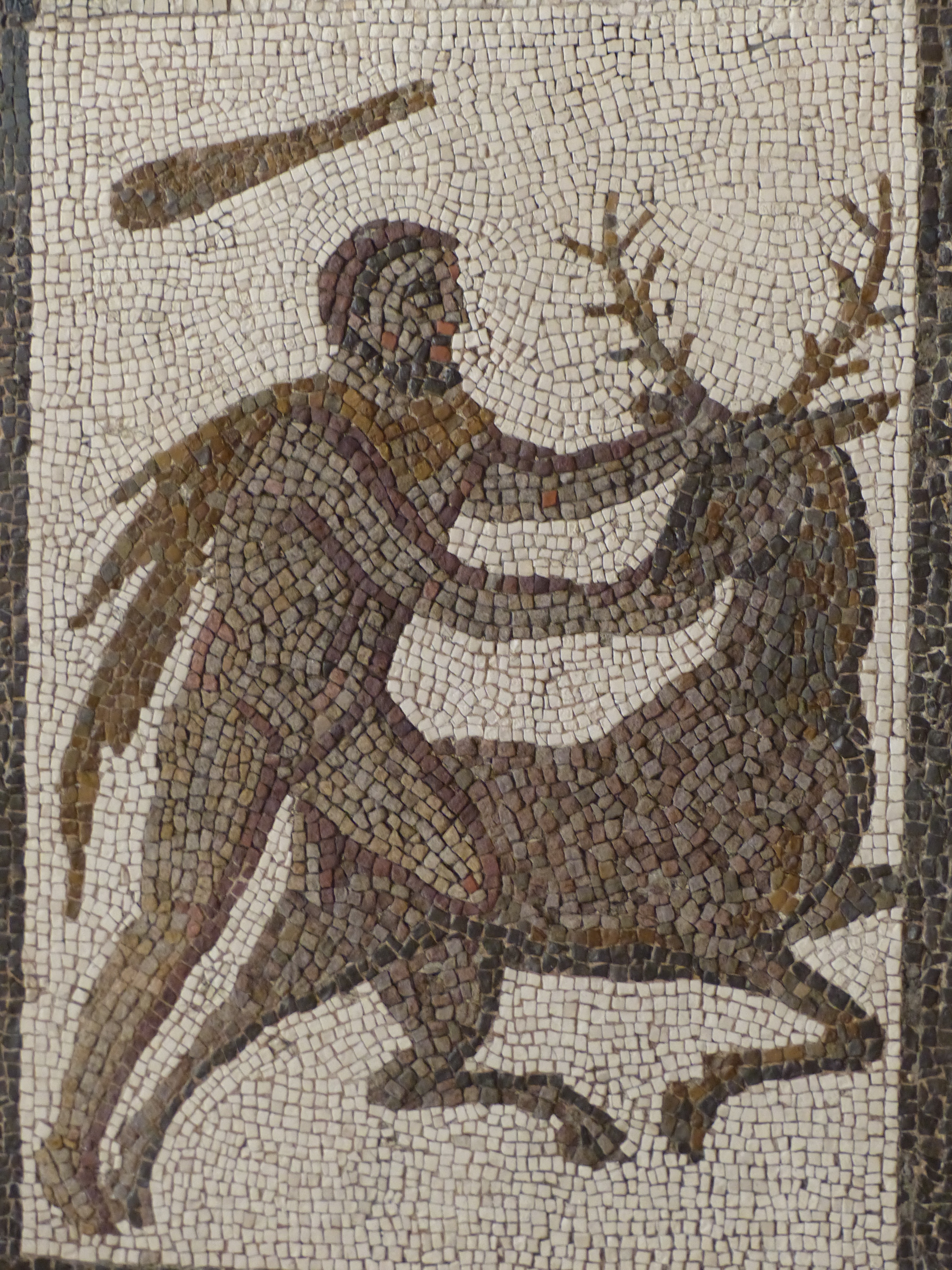
Heracles capturing the Ceryneian Hind. Detail of a Roman mosaic from Llíria (Valencia, Spain), 3rd century CE. Now in the Museo Arqueológico Nacional.

Angered by Heracles's success against the Nemean Lion and the Lernaean Hydra, Eurystheus (advised by Hera) devised an altogether different task for the hero, commanding Heracles to capture the Ceryneian Hind, a beast so fast it could outpace an arrow.

After a long search, Heracles awoke one night and laid eyes on the elusive hind, which was only visible due to the glint of moonlight on its antlers. He then chased the hind on foot for a full year through Greece, Thrace, Istria, and the land of the Hyperboreans. How Heracles caught the hind differs depending on the telling; in most versions, he captured the hind while it slept, rendering it lame with a trapping net.

Eurystheus commanded Heracles to catch the hind in the hope that it would enrage Artemis and lead her to punish the hero for his desecration of the sacred animal. As he was returning with the hind to present it to Eurystheus, Heracles encountered Artemis and her brother Apollo. He begged the goddess for forgiveness, explaining that he had snared the hind as part of his penance, but promised to return it to the wild soon thereafter. Convinced by Heracles's earnestness, Artemis forgave him, foiling Eurystheus's plan.

After bringing the hind to Eurystheus, Heracles was informed that it was to become part of the King's menagerie. Knowing that he must return the hind to the wild as he had promised Artemis, Heracles agreed to hand it over only on the condition that Eurystheus himself come out and take it from him. The King came forth, but the moment that Heracles let the hind go, it sprinted back to its mistress with unparalleled swiftness. Before taking his leave, Heracles commented that Eurystheus had not been quick enough, outraging the King.

=== Fourth: Erymanthian Boar ===
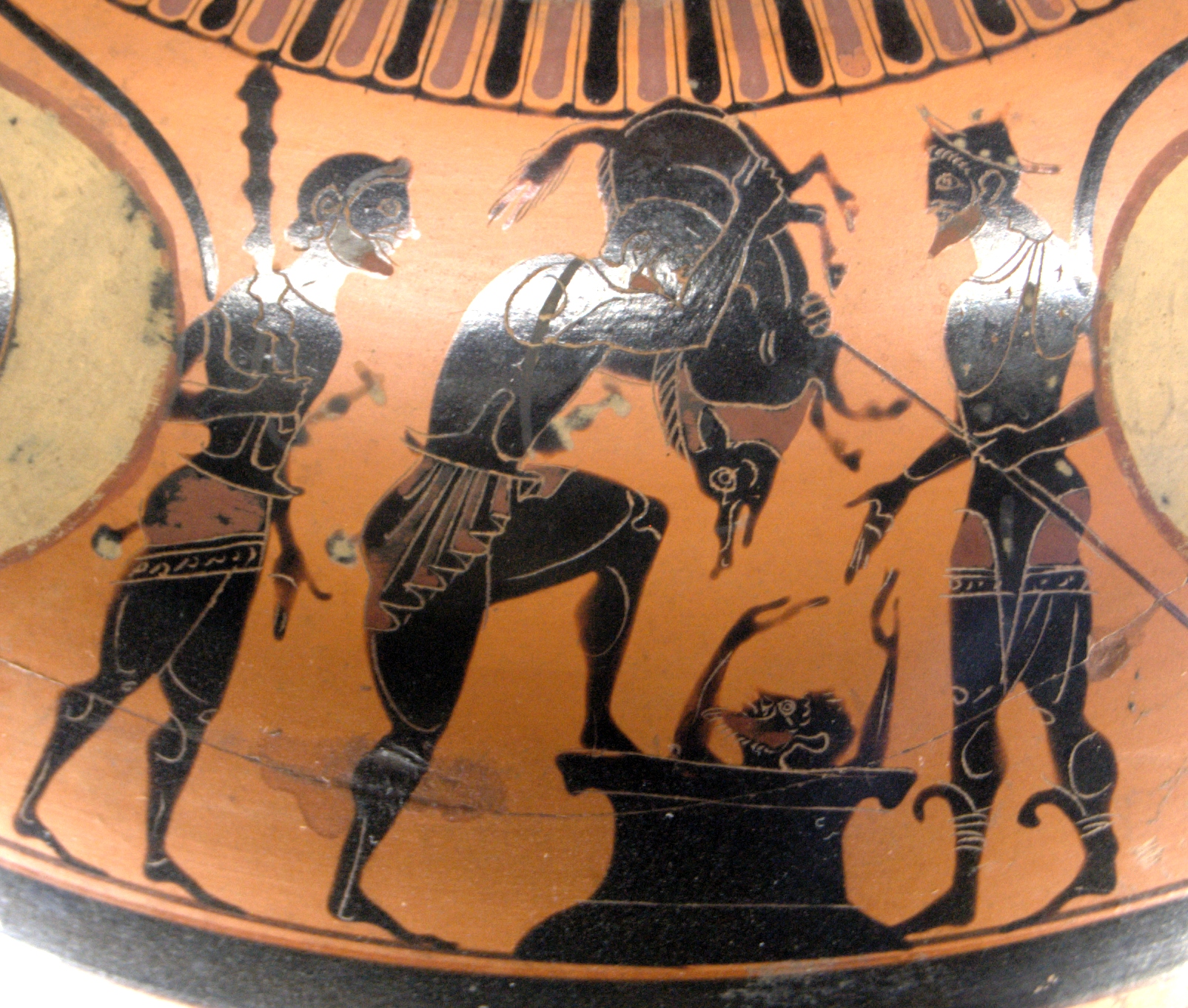
Heracles, Eurystheus and the Erymanthian boar. Side A from an Ancient Greek black-figured amphora, painted by the Antimenes painter, ca. 525 BC, from Etruria. Louvre Museum, Paris.

Eurystheus was disappointed that Heracles had overcome yet another creature and was humiliated by the hind's escape, so he assigned Heracles another dangerous task. By some accounts, the fourth labour was to bring the fearsome Erymanthian Boar back to Eurystheus alive (there is no single definitive telling of the labours). On the way to Mount Erymanthos where the boar lived, Heracles visited Pholus ("caveman"), a kind and hospitable centaur and old friend. Heracles ate with Pholus in his cavern (though the centaur devoured his meat raw) and asked for wine. Pholus had only one jar of wine, a gift from Dionysus to all the centaurs on Mount Erymanthos. Heracles convinced him to open it, and the smell attracted the other centaurs. They did not understand that wine needs to be tempered with water, became drunk, and attacked Heracles. Heracles shot at them with his poisonous arrows, killing many, and the centaurs retreated all the way to Chiron's cave.

Pholus was curious why the arrows caused so much death. He picked one up but dropped it, and the arrow stabbed his hoof, poisoning him. One version states that a stray arrow hit Chiron as well. He was immortal, but he still felt the pain. Chiron's pain was so great that he volunteered to give up his immortality and take the place of Prometheus, who had been chained to the top of a mountain to have his liver eaten daily by an eagle. Prometheus's torturer, the eagle, continued its torture on Chiron, so Heracles shot it dead with an arrow. It is generally accepted that the tale was meant to show Heracles as being the recipient of Chiron's surrendered immortality. However, this tale contradicts the tradition that Chiron later taught Achilles. The tale of the centaurs sometimes appears in other parts of the twelve labours, as does the freeing of Prometheus.

Heracles had visited Chiron to gain advice on how to catch the boar, and Chiron had told him to drive it into thick snow, which sets this labour in mid-winter. Heracles caught the boar, bound it, and carried it back to Eurystheus, who was frightened of it and ducked down in his half-buried storage pithos, begging Heracles to get rid of the beast.

=== Fifth: Augean stables ===
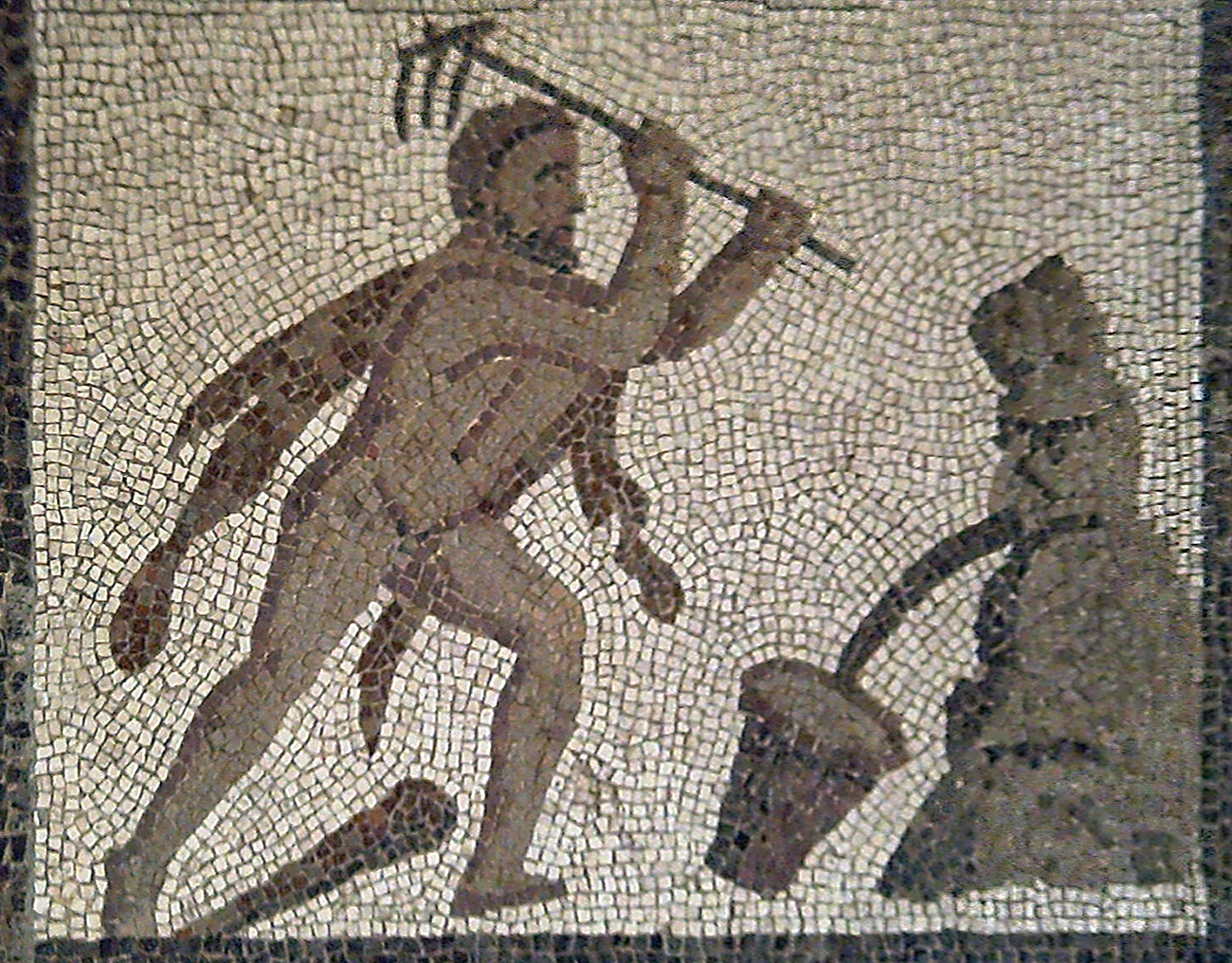
Heracles rerouting the rivers Alpheus and Peneus to clean out the Augean stables. Detail of a Roman mosaic from Llíria (Valencia, Spain), 3rd century CE. Now in the Museo Arqueológico Nacional.

The fifth labour was to clean the stables of King Augeas, without any help from another man. This assignment was intended to be both humiliating and impossible, since these divine livestock were immortal, and had produced an enormous quantity of dung. The Augean (/ɔːˈdʒiːən/) stables had not been cleaned in over 30 years, and over 1,000 cattle lived there. However, Heracles succeeded by rerouting the rivers Alpheus and Peneus to wash out the filth.

Before starting on the task, Heracles had asked Augeas for one-tenth of the cattle if he finished the task in one day, and Augeas agreed, but afterwards Augeas refused to honour the agreement on the grounds that Heracles had been ordered to carry out the task by Eurystheus anyway. Heracles claimed his reward in court and was supported by Augeas's son Phyleus. Augeas banished them both before the court had ruled. Heracles returned, slew Augeas, and gave his kingdom to Phyleus.

The success of this labour was ultimately discounted as the rushing waters had done the work of cleaning the stables, and because Heracles was paid for doing the labour; Eurystheus determined that Heracles still had seven labours to perform.

=== Sixth: Stymphalian birds ===
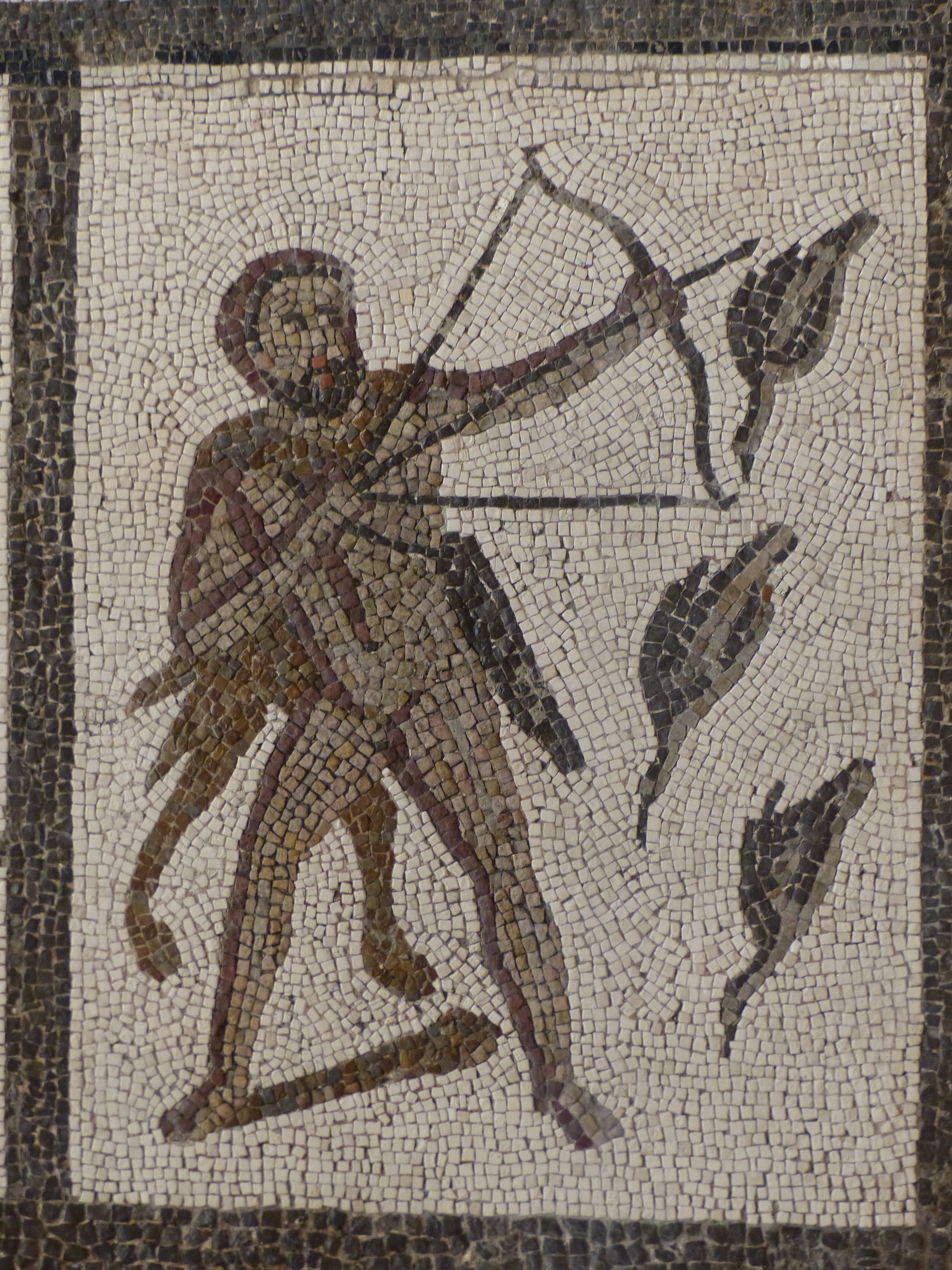
Heracles shooting the Stymphalian birds. Detail of a Roman mosaic from Llíria (Valencia, Spain), 3rd century CE. Now in the Museo Arqueológico Nacional.

The sixth labour was to defeat the Stymphalian birds, man-eating birds with beaks made of bronze and sharp metallic feathers they could launch at their victims. They were sacred to Ares, the god of war. Furthermore, their dung was highly toxic. They had migrated to Lake Stymphalia in Arcadia, where they bred quickly and took over the countryside, destroying local crops, fruit trees, and townspeople. Heracles could not go too far into the swamp, for it would not support his weight. Athena, noticing the hero's plight, gave Heracles a rattle which Hephaestus had made especially for the occasion. Heracles shook the rattle and frightened the birds into the air. Heracles then shot many of them with his arrows. The rest flew far away, never to return. In some versions of this story it is this labour, rather than the cleaning of the Augean stables, which was discounted by Eurystheus, because Heracles had received the help of Athena. The Argonauts would later encounter them.

=== Seventh: Cretan Bull ===
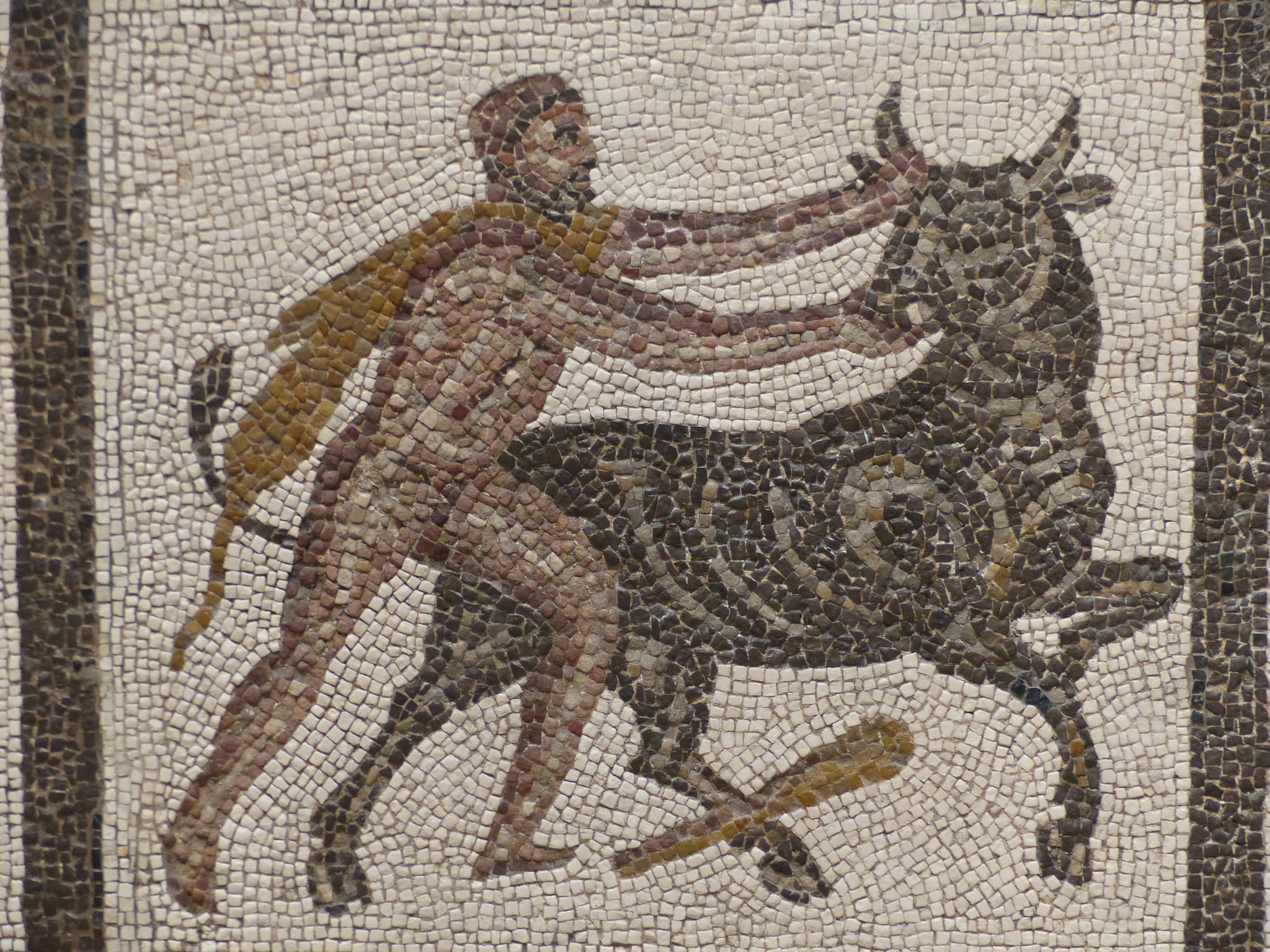
Heracles capturing the Cretan Bull. Detail of a Roman mosaic from Llíria (Valencia, Spain), 3rd century CE. Now in the Museo Arqueológico Nacional.

The seventh labour, also categorised as the first of the non-Peloponneisan labours, was to capture the Cretan Bull, father of the Minotaur. According to Apollodorus, Heracles sailed to Crete and asked King Minos for help, but Minos told Heracles to capture the bull himself, which he did. After showing the bull to Eurystheus, Heracles released the bull which ended up at Marathon.

=== Eighth: Mares of Diomedes ===
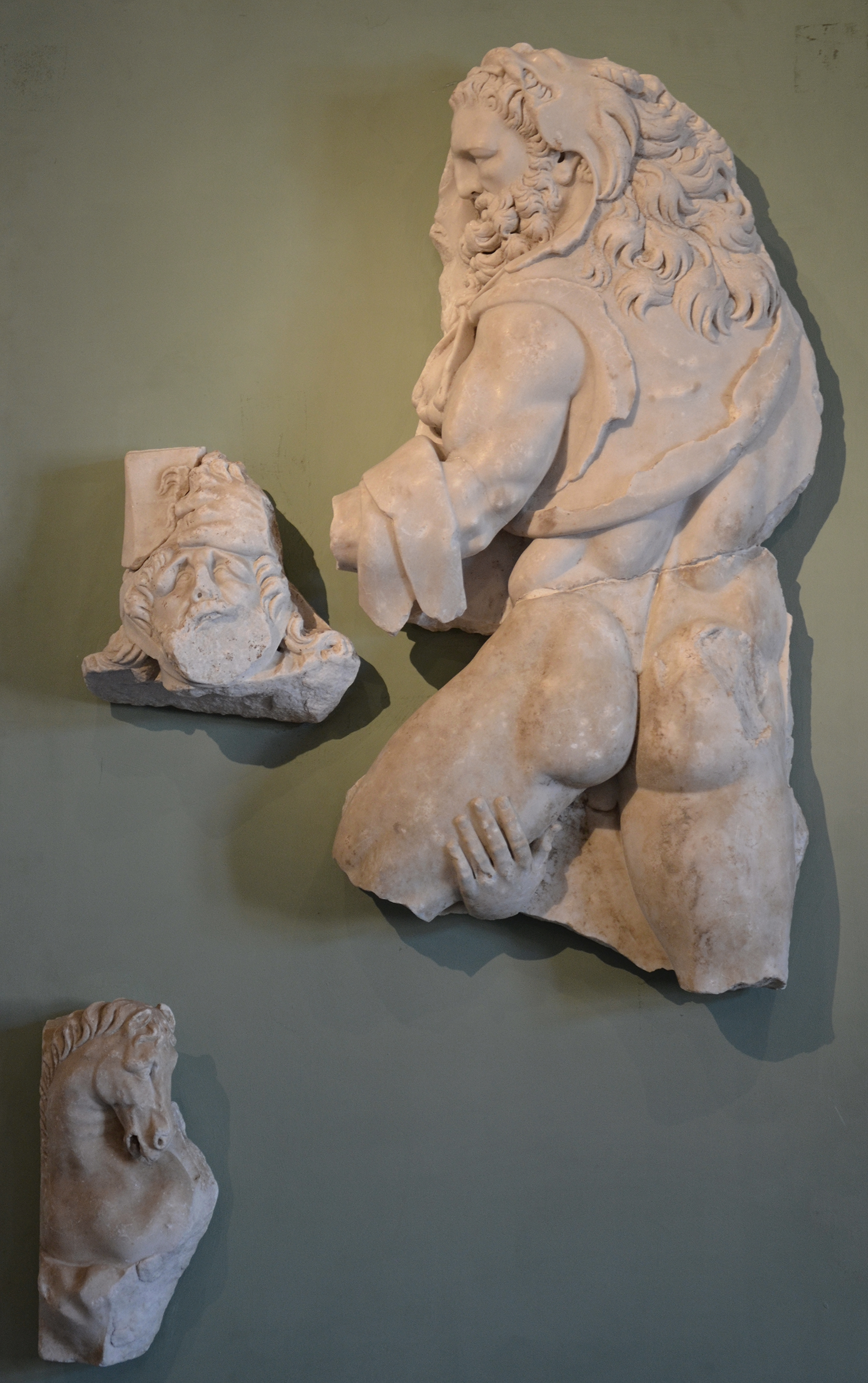
Heracles holds a kneeing Diomedes by the hair whilst Diomedes grabs Heracles' leg in an act of supplication. Marble relief from the Roman villa of Chiragan, end of 3rd century CE. Currently in the Musée Saint-Raymond, Toulouse, France.

As the eighth of his labours Heracles was sent by King Eurystheus to steal the fearsome man-eating mares of Diomedes who were stabled, according to Pliny the Elder, in the now-vanished city of Tirida. The horses' owner, Diomedes of Thrace, used unsuspecting guests to supply the mares with meals. The reason for the horses' man-eating proclivity is given variously as being taught to them by Diomedes himself, due to them eating a certain plant in the area, or due to them drinking from the waters of the river Cossinitus. The exact number and gender of the horses varies between sources, but they are usually mares. In literary sources their number is rarely mentioned, but they are explicitly referred to as a four-horse chariot team by Euripides, whilst Seneca refers to their chariot driver. In early artistic sources, one horse is depicted; in later sources two to four become more common, with their identity as a chariot team sometimes indicated by a wheel as part of the scene. The horses are named in the Fabulae – in which they are also reported to be male – as Podargos, Lampon, Xanthos, and Deinos.

The earliest surviving written account of the labour is that of Pindar (c. 518 – c. 438 BCE). Preserved in the Oxyrhynchus Papyri, it is fragmentary in nature with many lacunae. The surviving details have Heracles entering Diomedes' palace at night and distracting the mares – chained by single bronze chain to a stone manger – by throwing a man, presumably a stablehand, into the manger. Whilst the mares are tearing their victim apart, Heracles is able to break the chain and drive them away. Diodorus Siculus (fl. 1st century BCE) is aware of a similar tradition to that recounted by Pindar: because of their ferocity, the horses were tethered by iron chains to a bronze manger. Heracles threw Diomedes to the horses, who devoured their master and were then calm enough for Heracles to control. Heracles brought the horses to Eurystheus, who dedicated them to Hera. The descendants of the mares survived even to the time of Alexander the Great.

Apollodorus (1st or 2nd century CE)' account follows a different model in which Heracles brought a number of volunteers to help him capture the horses. After overpowering the grooms, Heracles broke the chains that tethered the horses and drove the mares down to sea. When Diomedes and his men, the Bistones, came to attempt to stop Heracles, Heracles left the mares in the care of his favored companion, Abderus, while he fought against Diomedes and his men. Heracles killed Diomedes, which caused the rest of the Bistones to flee. Abderus, however, lost control of his charges and was killed by the mares dragging him behind them. In his honour, Heracles founded the city of Abdera next to the Abderus' tomb. Other sources, however, record that Abderus was devoured by the mares. Apollodorus' account of the labour ends with Heracles bringing the horses to Eurystheus, who released them. The horses were then killed by wild animals on Mount Olympus.

In literary sources there is variant found in Ovid's Metamorphoses (43 BC – AD 17/18), and later in the Fabulae, and in the work of Quintus Smyrnaeus (latter 4th century CE), and Helasius, in which Heracles kills both Diomedes and his horses.

Other traditions concerning the labour are less well-attested. A possible variant in which the horses were winged is suggested by artistic evidence: on an early fifth-century BCE white-ground lekythos by the Marathon Painter Herakles is shown grappling one of four winged horses by the neck, and on a scarab from around 500 BCE, possibly of Etruscan origin, Herakles appears between rearing, winged horses. The Roman Epicurean philosopher Lucretius (c. 99 –55 BCE) makes a passing reference to the mares of Diomedes in his De rerum natura, describing them as breathing fire from their nostrils. It is possible that Lucretius is referencing Euripides' Alcestis, in which Heracles tells the chorus that he would only have trouble putting the bit in the mouths of the horses if they breathed fire. The chorus replies that they do not breath fire, explaining instead that they are man-eating.

=== Ninth: Belt of Hippolyta ===
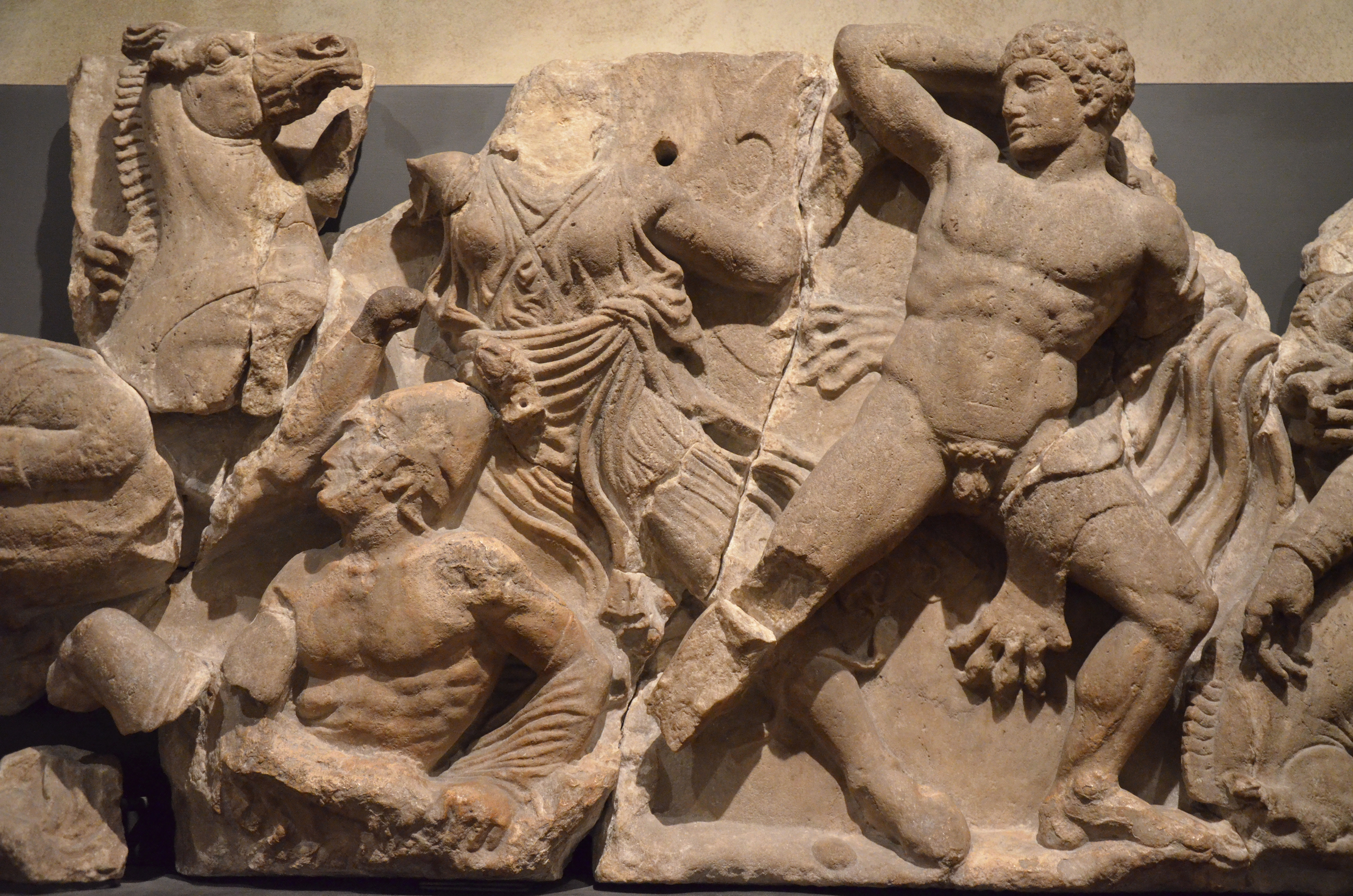
Heracles fighting an Amazon. Detail of the Bassae Frieze, from the Temple of Apollo Epikourios at Bassae. c.420–400 BCE. Now in the British Museum, London, England.

As his ninth labour, Heracles travelled to the land of the Amazons to bring back the Belt of Hippolyta, the queen of the Amazons. According to Apollodorus, the belt was gifted to Hippolyta by her father Ares, as an emblem of her position as queen. In his account, Eurystheus set Heracles the task because his daughter Admete wanted to have the belt for herself. In earlier sources, however, the purpose of the labour was seemingly for Heracles to overcome the Amazons, with Eurystheus requiring the belt as evidence of his success.

Accompanied by a group of companions, Heracles set sail for the land of Amazons, which was generally believed to be along the shore at the southern end of the Black Sea. Sources vary on who came with him: Hellanicus states that he was accompanied by all of the Argonauts, while Pindar mentions that Peleus came on the voyage, Philochorus considered Theseus to have been his companion, and an early Corinthian vase shows Iolaus and another figure named Pasimelon by his side. The number of ships they leave in also varies: Apollodorus says they went in a single ship, while Herodotus states that there were three, and in a late account there were nine. Apollodorus relates that on the way to Themiscyra, where the Amazons lived, he and his crew stopped at the island of Paros, where several of the sons of Minos lived; when these sons killed two of Heracles's companions, he retaliated by murdering them. When he began threatening others, he was offered two of Minos's grandchildren, Alcaeus and Sthenelus, whom he took into his crew. Continuing on their voyage, they next arrived at the court of Lycus in Mysia; in a battle between Lycus and King Mygdon of Bebryces, Heracles killed the rival king and gained land from the Bebryces, and gifted it to Lycus, who named it Heraclea.

Hippolyta, impressed with Heracles and his exploits, agreed to give him the belt and would have done so had Hera not disguised herself and walked among the Amazons sowing seeds of distrust. She claimed the strangers were plotting to carry off the queen of the Amazons. Alarmed, the warrior women set off on horseback to confront Heracles. According to Diodorus Siculus, Aella was the first Amazon to charge Heracles. Her name, meaning "stormswift," signified her remarkable speed and agility, but even she could not withstand Heracles and was ultimately defeated. Believing that Hippolyta had betrayed him, Heracles killed her, took the belt, and, after fighting the other Amazons, went to Troy, where Laomedon was attempting to sacrifice his daughter to appease Apollo and Poseidon. The two gods had sent a plague and a sea monster respectively; the sea monster would come inland on a flood-tide and grab people on the plain. On the advice of his oracles, Laomedon had tied up his daughter, Hesione, in a similar fashion to Andromeda, originally he was going to sacrifice the three daughters of Phoinodamos, however he refused, so Laomedon would have his own daughter sacrificed instead. Seeing her exposed, Heracles promised to save her on condition of receiving from Laomedon the mares which Zeus had given in compensation for the rape of Ganymede. After Laomedon promised to give the horses to Heracles, he killed the monster and saved Hesione. But when Laomedon wouldn't give him the horses, Hercules went back to sea after threatening to declare war on Troy. Heracles then arrived in Aenus, where he was entertained by Poltys, as Heracles sailed away, he fired a shot and killed Sarpedon, Polty's brother. Afterwards, he went to Thasos and subjugated the Thracians living there, then left after he gave it to the sons of Androgeus to dwell in. From Thasos he proceeded to Torone, and there, being challenged to wrestle by Polygonus and Telegonus, both sons of Proteus, he killed them in the wrestling match. And having brought the belt to Mycenae he gave it to Eurystheus.

=== Tenth: Cattle of Geryon ===
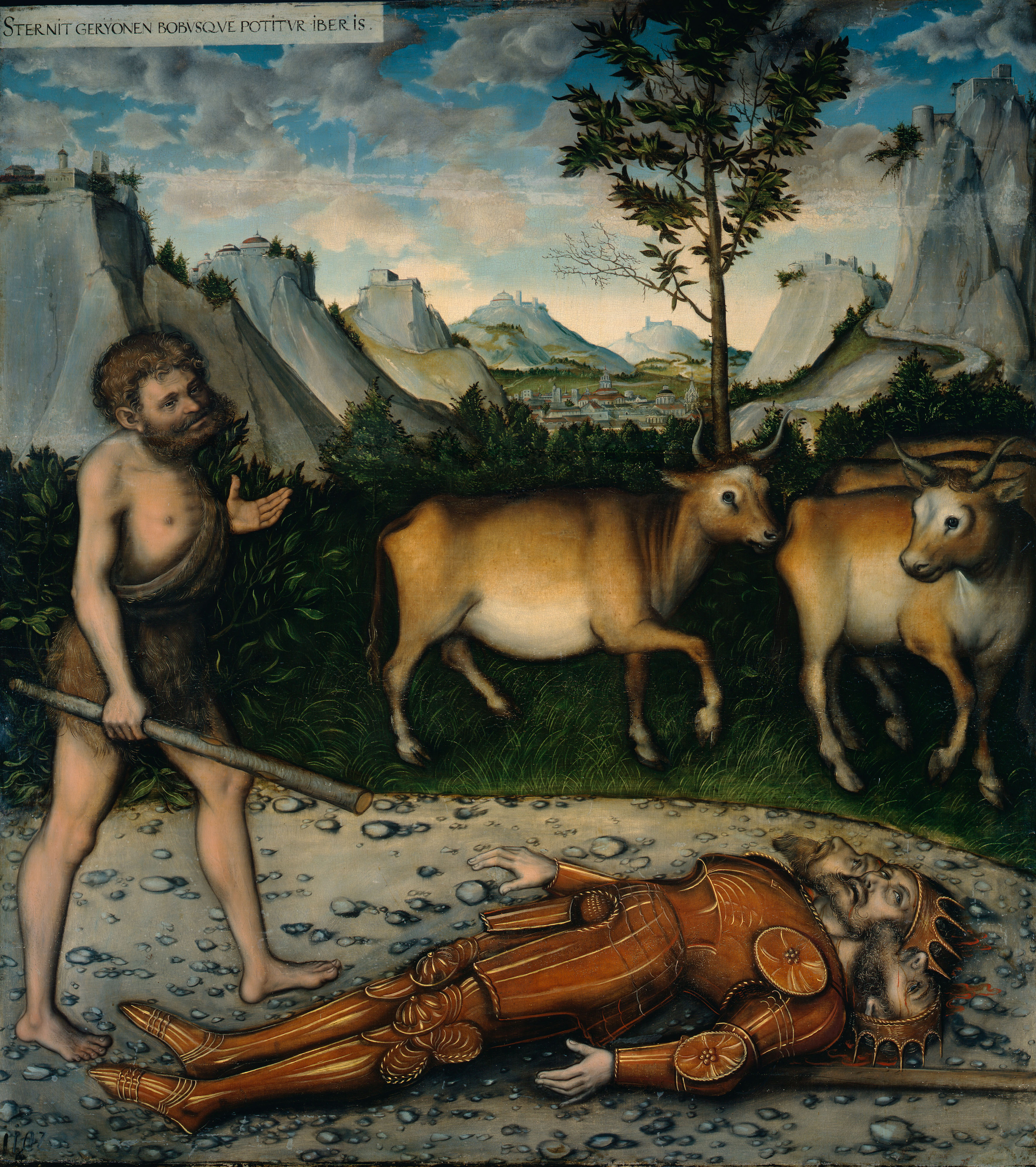
Heracles and the Cattle of Geryones, workshop of Lucas Cranach the Elder

The tenth labour was to obtain the cattle of the three-bodied giant Geryon. In Apollodorus's account, Heracles had to go to the island of Erytheia in the far west. On the way he became so frustrated at the heat that he aimed an arrow at the Sun. The sun-god Helios, impressed by his audacity, gave Heracles the golden cup that Helios used to sail across the sea from west to east each night. Heracles took the cup and rode it to Erytheia.

When Heracles landed at Erytheia, he was confronted by the two-headed dog Orthrus. With one blow from his olive-wood club, Heracles killed Orthrus. Eurytion the herdsman came to assist Orthrus, but Heracles dealt with him the same way.

On hearing the commotion, Geryon sprang into action, carrying three shields and three spears, and wearing three helmets. He attacked Heracles at the River Anthemus, but was slain by one of Heracles's poisoned arrows. Heracles shot so forcefully that the arrow pierced Geryon's forehead, "and Geryon bent his neck over to one side, like a poppy that spoils its delicate shapes, shedding its petals all at once."

Heracles then had to herd the cattle back to Eurystheus. In Roman versions of the narrative, Heracles drove the cattle over the Aventine Hill on the future site of Rome. The giant Cacus, who lived there, stole some of the cattle as Heracles slept, making the cattle walk backwards so that they left no trail, a repetition of the trick of the young Hermes. According to some versions, Heracles drove his remaining cattle past the cave, where Cacus had hidden the stolen animals, and they began calling out to each other. In other versions, Cacus's sister Caca told Heracles where he was. Heracles then killed Cacus and set up an altar on the spot, later the site of Rome's Forum Boarium (the cattle market).

To annoy Heracles, Hera sent a gadfly to bite the cattle, which irritated them, and made them scatter across the skirts of the mountain of Thrace. He was able to capture some, and drove them to the Hellesponte, but the remainder were wild, after finally collecting the cows, Heracles blamed the river Strymon, and whereas it had been navigable before, he made it unnavigable by filling it with rocks. When he finally reached the court of Eurystheus, the cattle were sacrificed to Hera.

=== Eleventh: Golden apples of the Hesperides ===
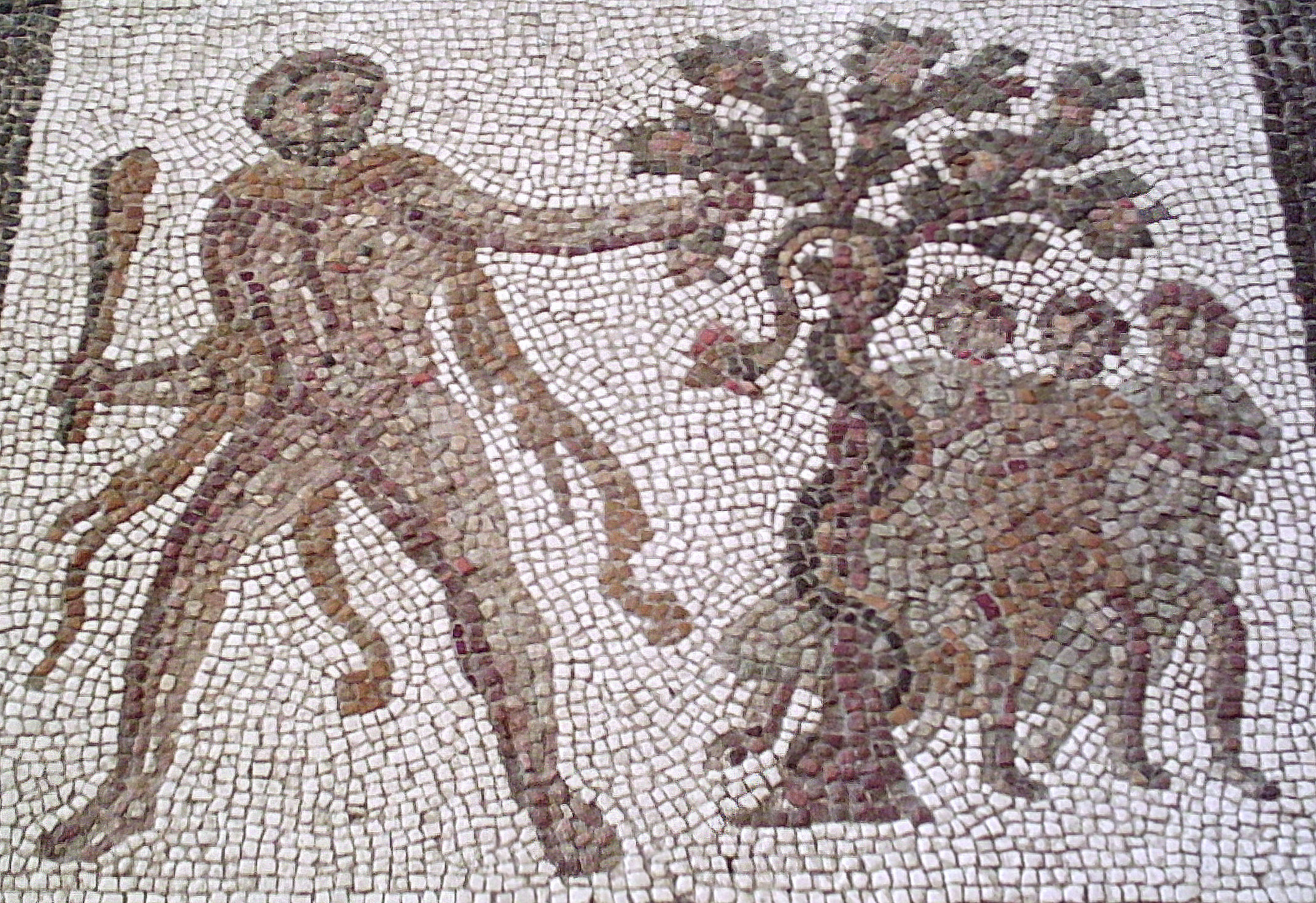
Hercules stealing the golden apples from the Garden of the Hesperides. Detail of a Roman mosaic from Llíria (Valencia, Spain), 3rd century CE. Now in the Museo Arqueológico Nacional.

According to Apollodorus (but not other traditions), the oracle had told Heracles to perform ten labours (which according to Apollodorus, took eight years and a month), but Eurystheus gave him two more, claiming that slaying the Hydra did not count (because Iolaus helped Heracles) and neither did cleaning the Augean Stables (either because he was paid for the job or because the rivers did the work).

The eleventh labour was to steal three of the golden apples from the garden of the Hesperides. Heracles went to Illyria, and, at the river Eridanus, met the nymphs, who revealed the Old Man of the Sea the shapeshifting sea god, to him, Heracles then caught the Old Man of the Sea, to learn where the Garden of the Hesperides was located. In some versions of the tale, Heracles was directed to ask Prometheus. As payment, he freed Prometheus from his daily torture. This tale is more usually found as part of the story of the Erymanthian Boar, since it is associated with Chiron choosing to forgo immortality and taking Prometheus's place.

Heracles then went to Libya, where the Old Man had told him to go, he meets Antaeus, who was invincible as long as he touched his mother, Gaia, the Earth. Heracles killed Antaeus by holding him aloft and crushing him in a bear hug.

Heracles then stopped in Egypt, where King Busiris decided to make him the yearly sacrifice, but Heracles burst out of his chains, and killed both Busiris and his son Amphidamas. He then went to Asia, he put in to Thermydrae, the harbor of the Lindians. And having loosed one of the bullocks from the cart of a cowherd, he sacrificed it and feasted. But the cowherd, unable to protect himself, stood on a certain mountain and cursed. Which is why, Apollodorus claims, that when they sacrifice to Heracles, they do it with curses.

Heracles finally made his way to the garden of the Hesperides, where he encountered Atlas holding up the heavens on his shoulders. Heracles persuaded Atlas to get the three golden apples for him by offering to hold up the heavens in his place for a little while. Atlas could get the apples because, in this version, he was the father or otherwise related to the Hesperides. When Atlas returned, he decided that he did not want to take the heavens back and instead offered to deliver the apples himself, but Heracles tricked him by agreeing to remain in place of Atlas on the condition that Atlas relieve him temporarily while Heracles adjusted his cloak. Atlas agreed, but Heracles reneged and walked away with the apples. According to an alternative version, Heracles slew Ladon, the dragon who guarded the apples, instead, with a bow and arrow and carried the apples away. The following day, Jason and the Argonauts passed by on their chthonic return journey from Colchis, hearing the lament of "shining" Aegle, one of the four Hesperides, and viewing the still-twitching Ladon. Eurystheus was furious that Heracles had accomplished something that Eurystheus thought could not possibly be done.

=== Twelfth: Cerberus ===
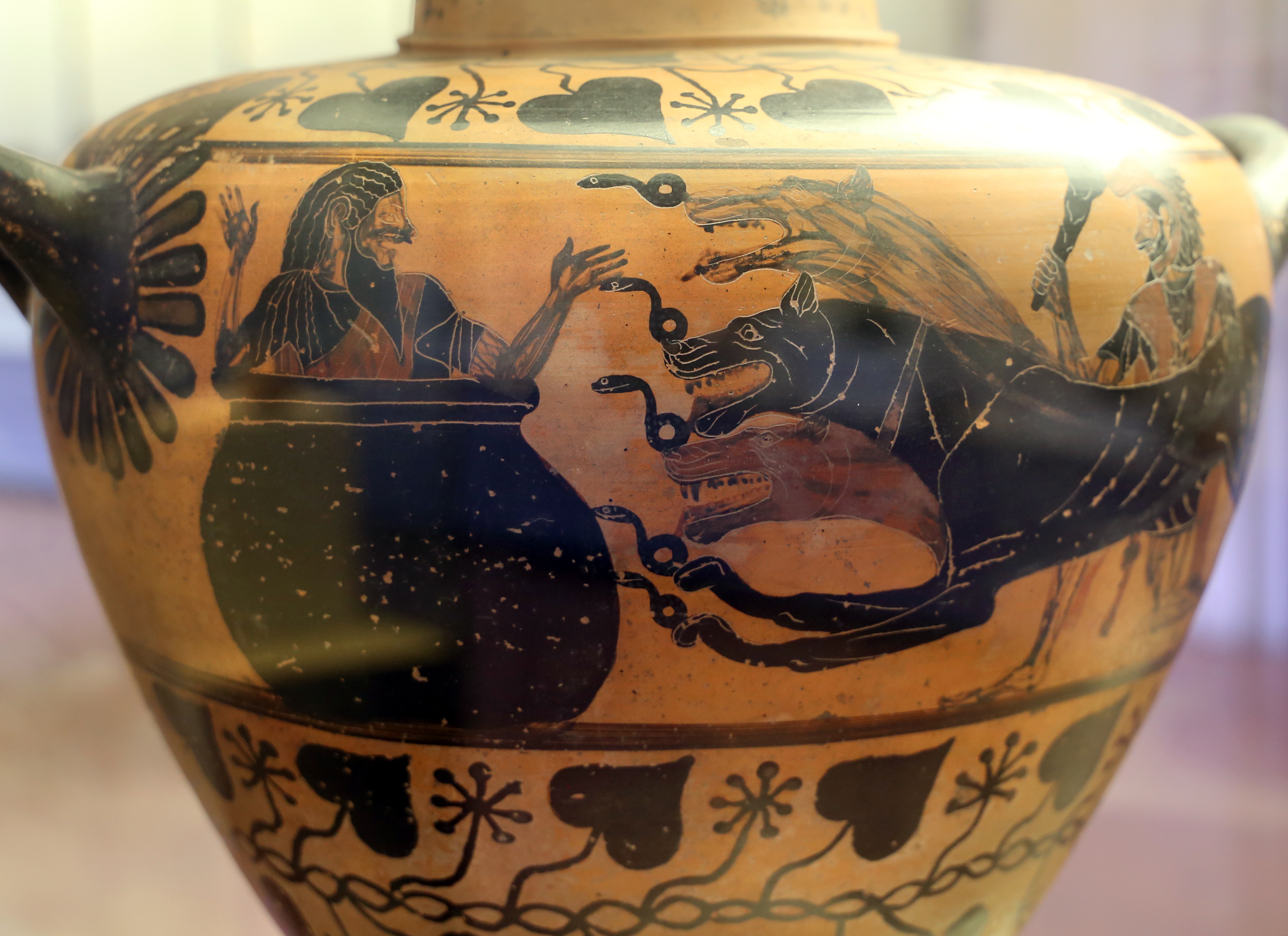
Hercules presenting Cerberus to Eurystheus. Caeretan hydria, c. 525 BCE. Now in the Louvre, Paris.

The twelfth and final labour was the capture of Cerberus, the multi-headed dog that was the guardian of the gates of the underworld. To prepare for his descent into the underworld, Heracles first had to go to Eleusis in order to be initiated into the Eleusinian Mysteries. He was then able to enter the underworld, with his half-siblings, Hermes and Athena, as his guides.

While in the underworld, Heracles met Theseus and Pirithous. The two companions had been imprisoned by Hades for attempting to kidnap his wife, Persephone. One tradition tells of snakes coiling around their legs, then turning into stone. Another says that Hades feigned hospitality and prepared a feast, inviting them to sit; they unknowingly sat in chairs of forgetfulness and were permanently ensnared. When Heracles had pulled Theseus first from his chair, some of his thigh stuck to it (this explains the supposedly lean thighs of Athenians), but the Earth shook at his attempt to liberate Pirithous, whose desire to have the goddess for himself was so insulting he was doomed to stay behind.

Heracles found Hades and asked permission to bring Cerberus to the surface, which Hades agreed to if Heracles could subdue the beast without using weapons. Heracles overpowered Cerberus with his bare hands and slung the beast over his back. He carried Cerberus out of the underworld through a cavern entrance in the Peloponnese and brought it to Eurystheus, who again fled into his pithos. Eurystheus begged Heracles to return Cerberus to the underworld, offering in return to release him from any further labours when Cerberus disappeared back to his master.

== Aftermath ==
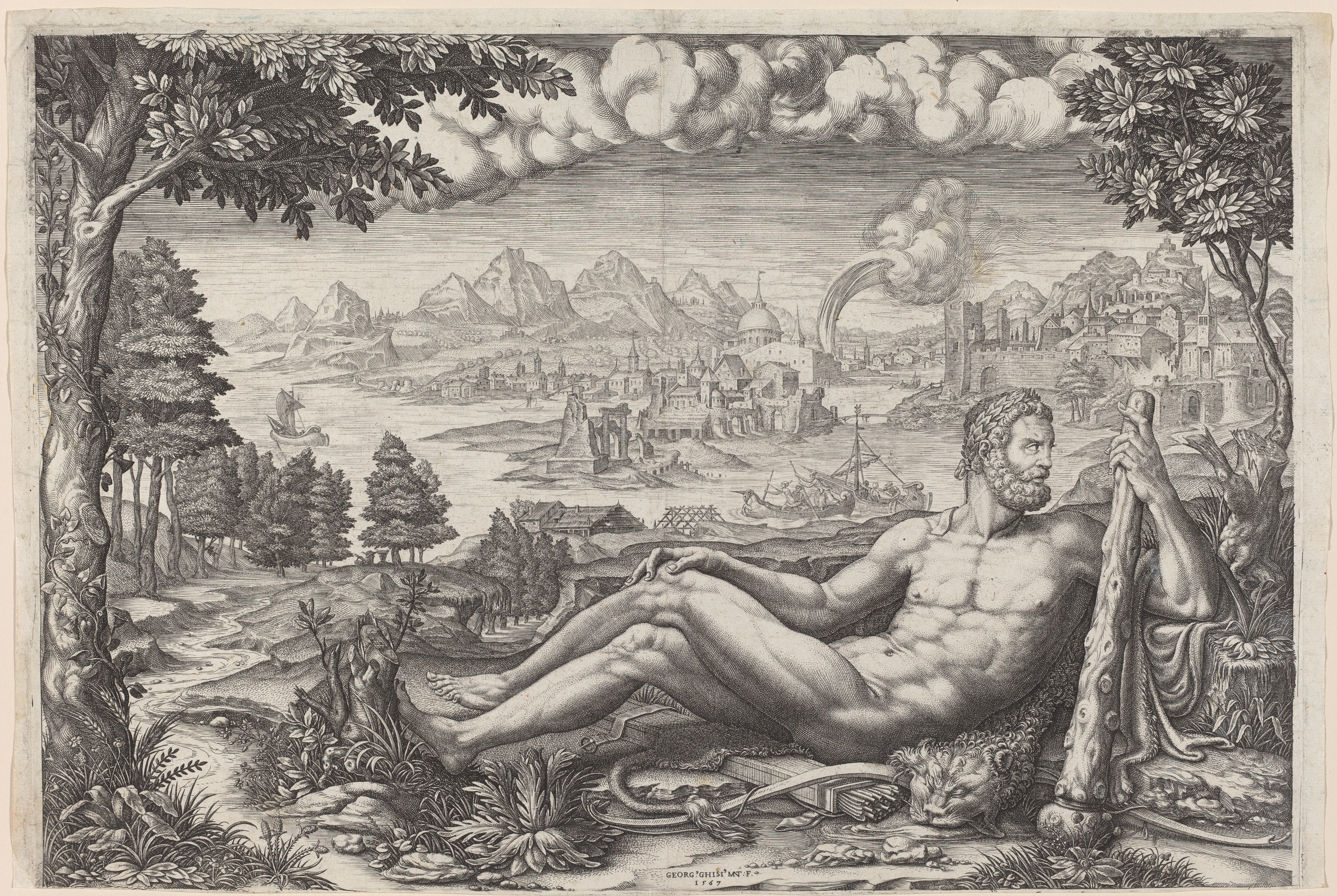
Hercules Resting from His Labors, 1567 engraving by Giorgio Ghisi

After completing the twelve labours, one tradition says that Heracles joined Jason and the Argonauts in their quest for the Golden Fleece. However, Herodorus (c. 400 BC) disputed this and denied that Heracles ever sailed with the Argonauts. According to a separate tradition (e.g., Argonautica) Heracles accompanied the Argonauts but did not travel with them as far as Colchis.

According to Euripides's play Herakles, it is at this point after his labours are completed and he is returning home to meet his wife and family that Heracles is driven mad and kills them, after which he is exiled from Thebes and leaves for Athens.

Other versions tell the epilogue of Hercules becoming the general of an army, and conquering and pillaging various cities, from one of which he obtained a princess, whose name varies in different accounts. Hercules's wife, thinking he would have an affair with her, was so desperate as to believe that a centaur's blood was a love potion and dipped Hercules's clothes with it. As it was in fact poison, Hercules screamed in agony and begged Iolaus to burn him on a funeral pyre.

== Rationalising interpretations ==
Some ancient authors attempted to rationalise myths and provide euhemeristic, metaphorical, or allegorical meanings for the Labours of Heracles. For example, Heraclitus the Grammarian wrote in his Homeric Problems:

I turn to Heracles. We must not suppose he attained such power in those days as a result of his physical strength. Rather, he was a man of intellect, an initiate in heavenly wisdom, who, as it were, shed light on philosophy, which had been hidden in deep darkness. The most authoritative of the Stoics agree with this account ... The (Erymanthian) boar which he overcame is the common incontinence of men; the (Nemean) lion is the indiscriminate rush towards improper goals; in the same way, by fettering irrational passions he gave rise to the belief that he had fettered the violent (Cretan) bull. He banished cowardice also from the world, in the shape of the hind of Ceryneia. There was another "labor" too, not properly so called, in which he cleared out the mass of dung (from the Augean stables)—in other words, the foulness that disfigures humanity. The (Stymphalian) birds he scattered are the windy hopes that feed our lives; the many-headed hydra that he burned, as it were, with the fires of exhortation, is pleasure, which begins to grow again as soon as it is cut out.

— Donald Andrew Russell, David Konstan, Heraclitus: Homeric Problems 33 (2005)

This trend became more prominent in the Renaissance.

== Post-classical art ==
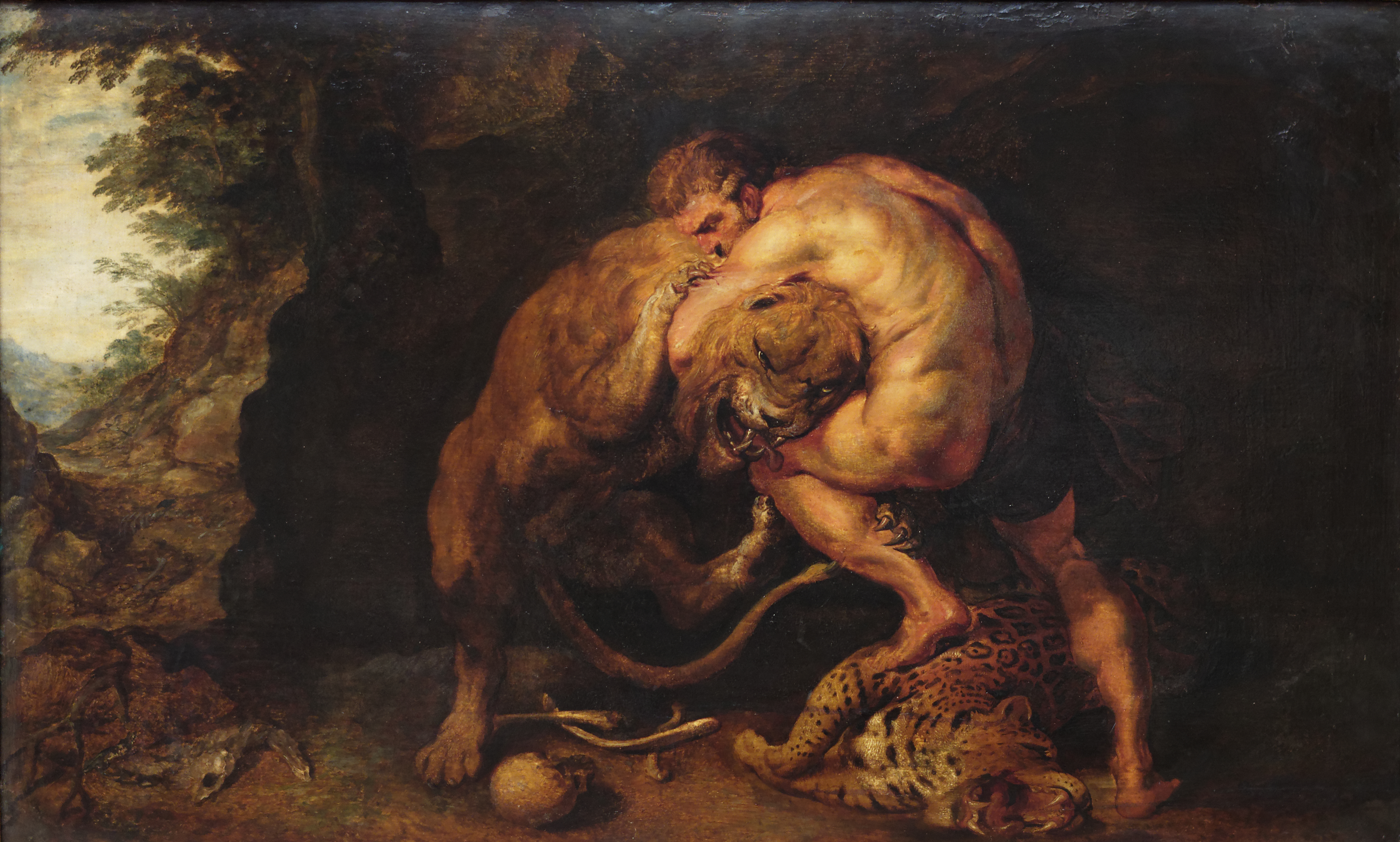
Hercules's fight with the Nemean lion, Pieter Paul Rubens.

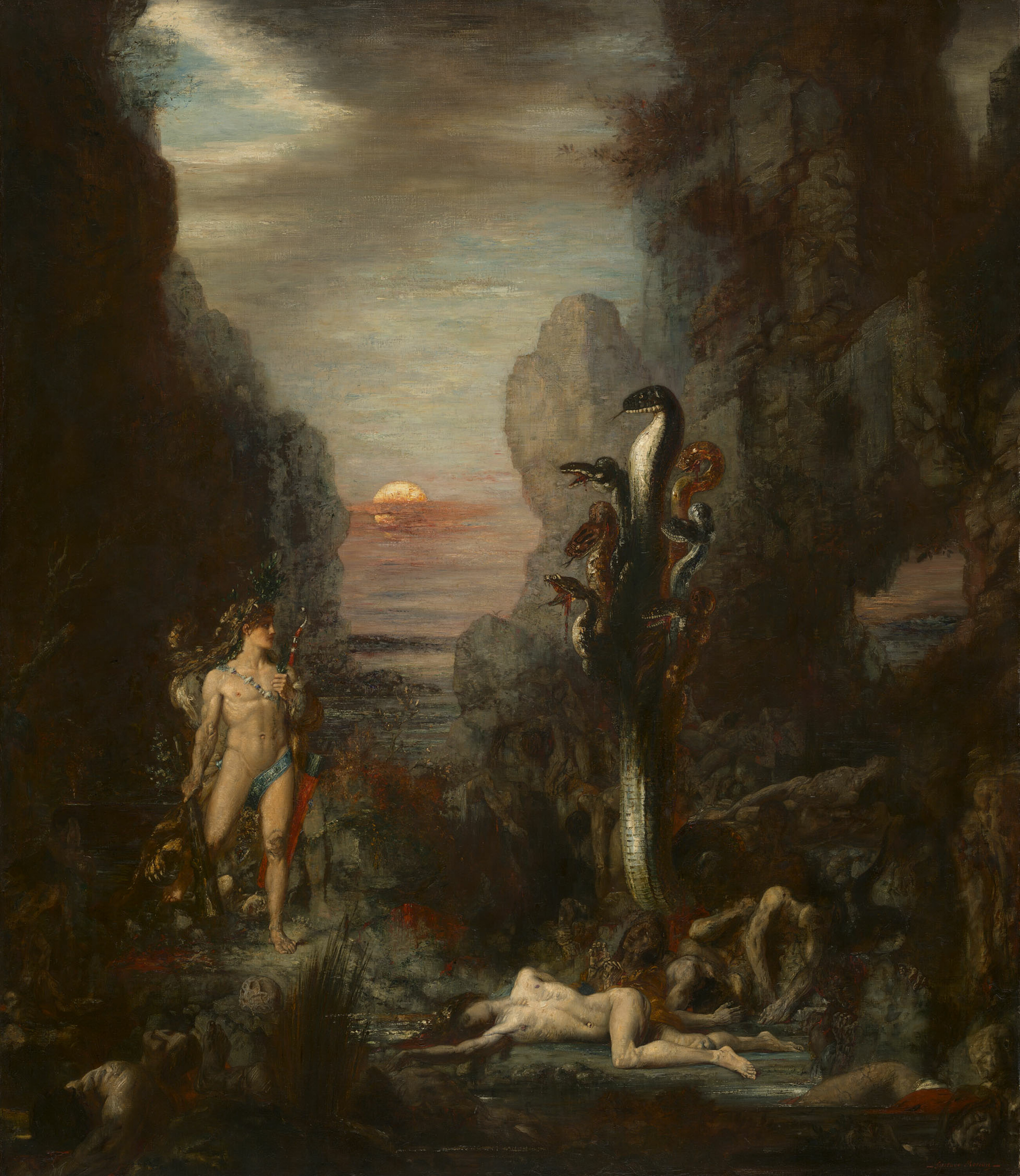
Hercules and the Lernaean Hydra (1875–76) by Gustave Moreau

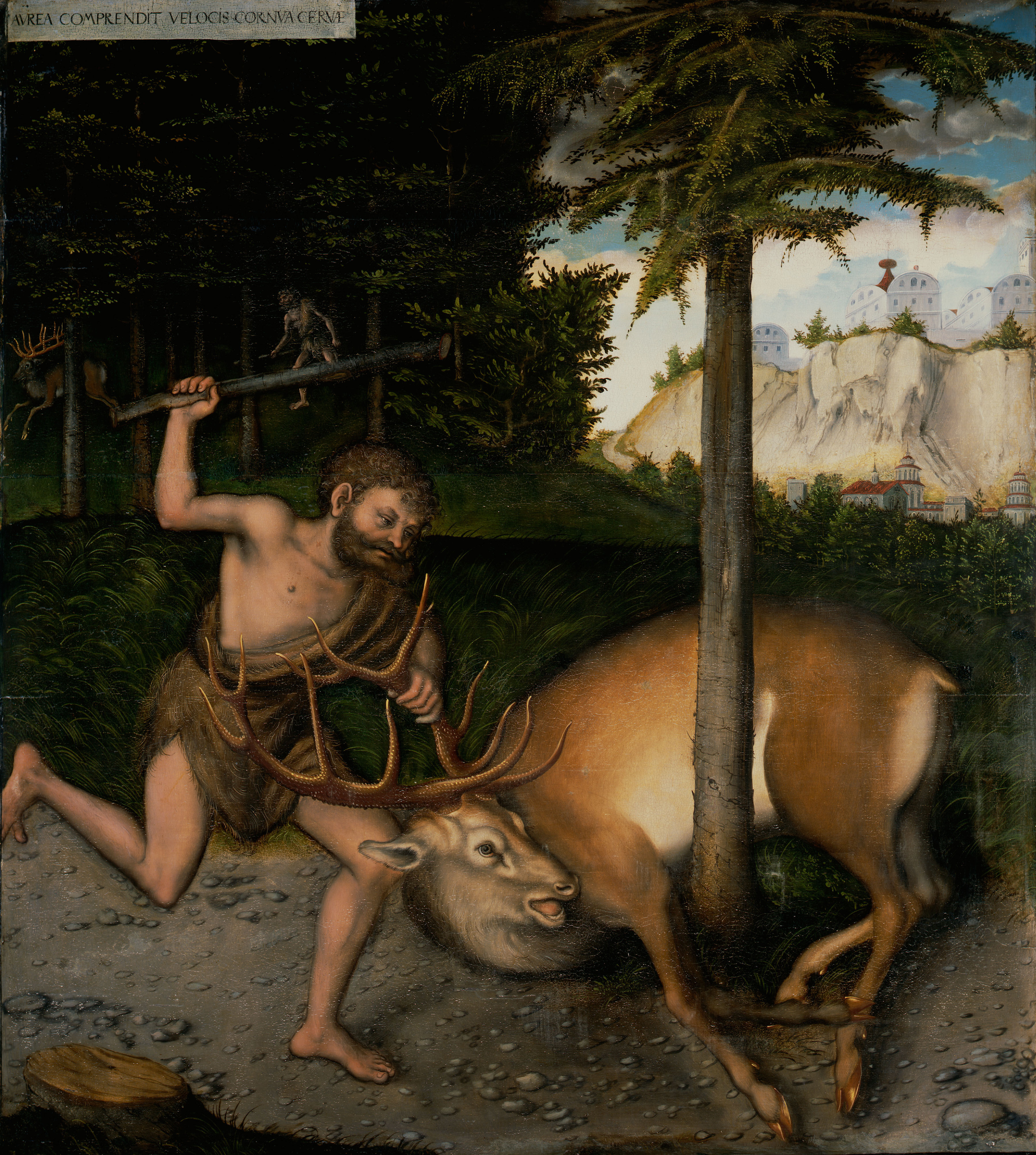
Heracles capturing the Ceryneian Hind, Workshop of Lucas Cranach the Elder

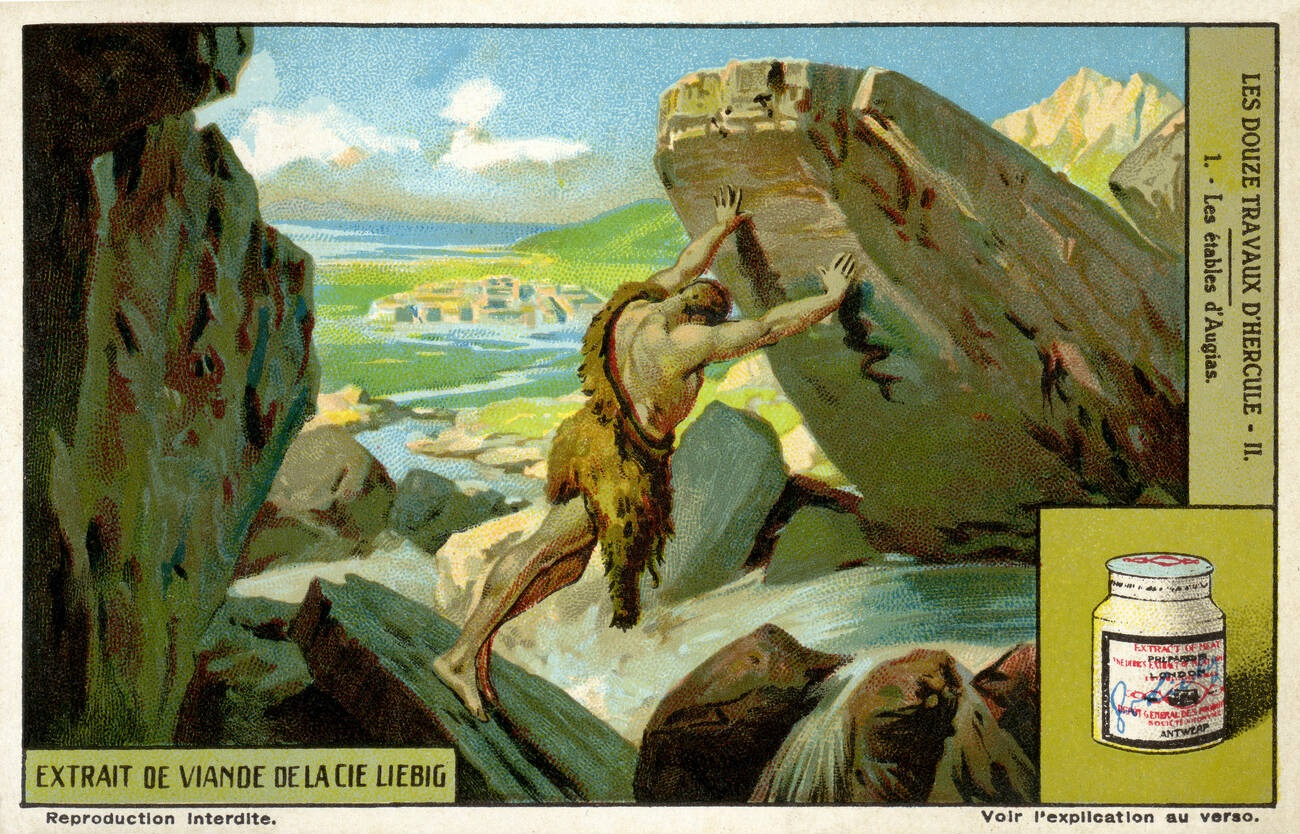
Heracles cleans the Augean stables by redirecting the river

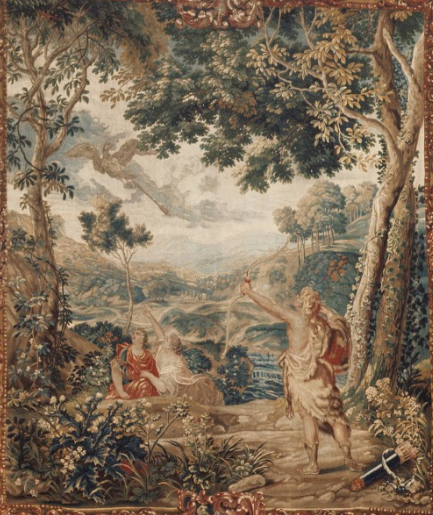
Heracles and the Stymphalian birds

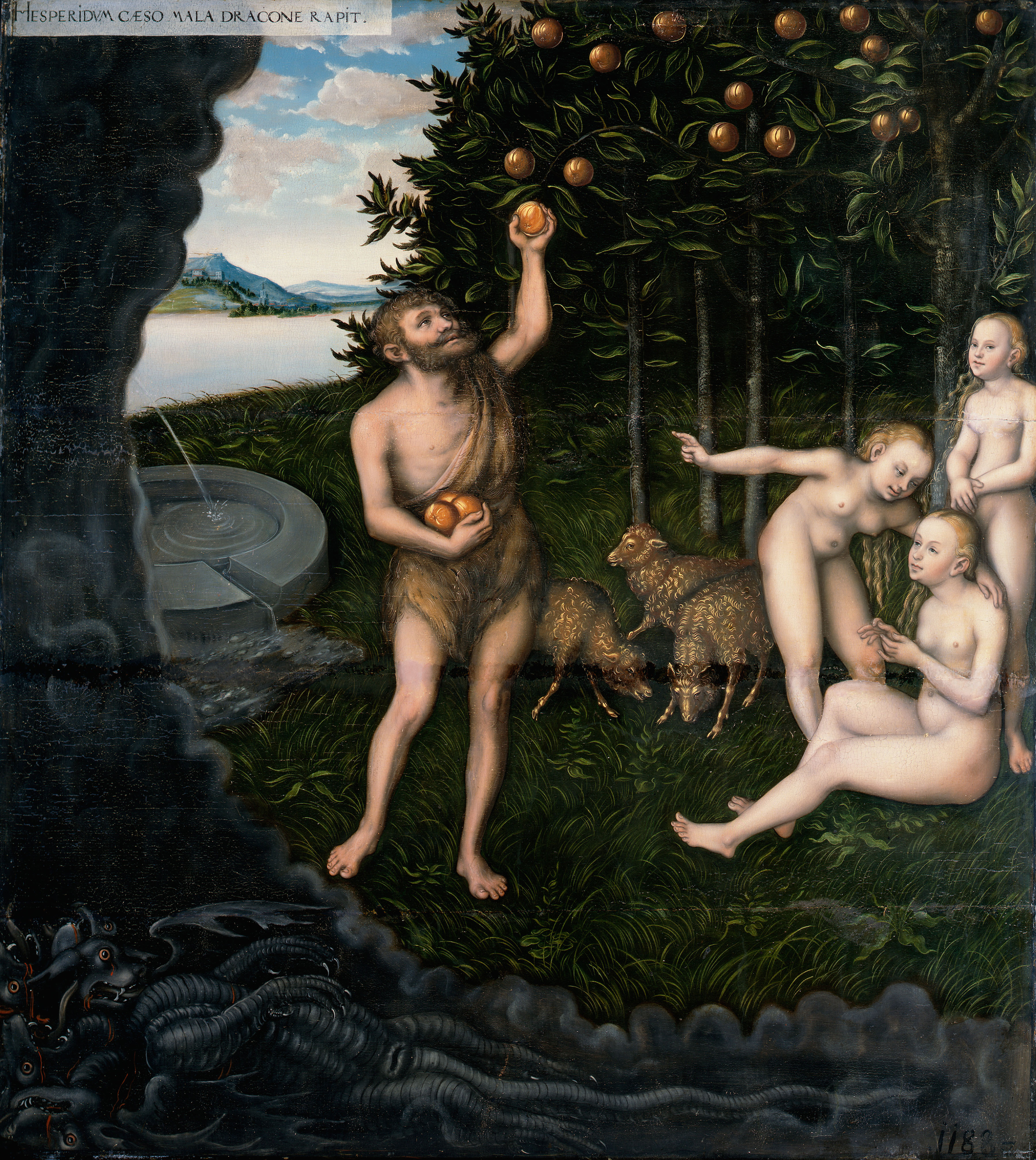
Heracles stealing the apples from the Hesperides, workshop of Lucas Cranach the Elder

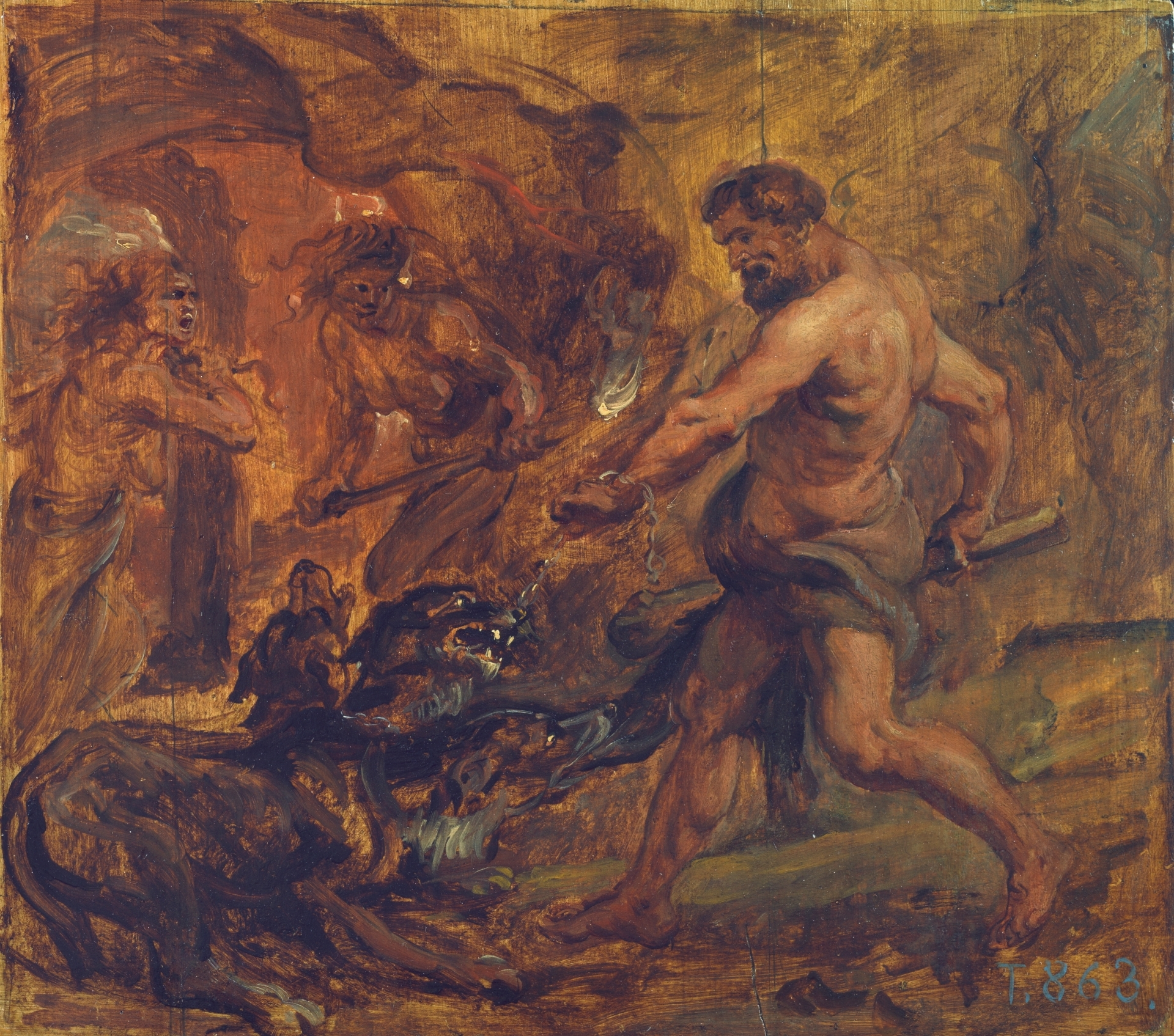
Heracles and Cerberus, Pieter Paul Rubens

== See also ==
- Angim
- Copreus of Elis
- Rostam's Seven Labours, an ancient Persian tale of another Indo-European hero showing similarities to those of Hercules
- The Tale of the Bamboo Cutter
