= Mygdon (brother of Amycus) =

Character of ancient Greek mythology, son of Poseidon, king of the Bebriks

In Greek mythology, King Mygdon (Ancient Greek: Μύγδων) of the Bebryces, people who lived in Bithynia, in northern Asia Minor. He was the son of Poseidon and the Bithynian nymph Melia and thus brother of Amycus, also a Bebrycian king.

== Mythology ==
According to Apollodorus, Mygdon was killed by Heracles on the way to Pontus to complete his ninth labour, which was to fetch the belt of Queen Hippolyte of the Amazons. After Heracles killed Mygdon, he gave his former lands to Lycus, who renamed the place Heraclea in honour of Heracles.

. . .in a battle between him [i.e Lycus] and the king of the Bebryces Hercules sided with Lycus and slew many, amongst others King Mygdon, brother of Amycus. And he took much land from the Bebryces and gave it to Lycus, who called it all Heraclea.
