= Amycos Satyrykos =

Fragmentary Ancient Greek play by Sophocles

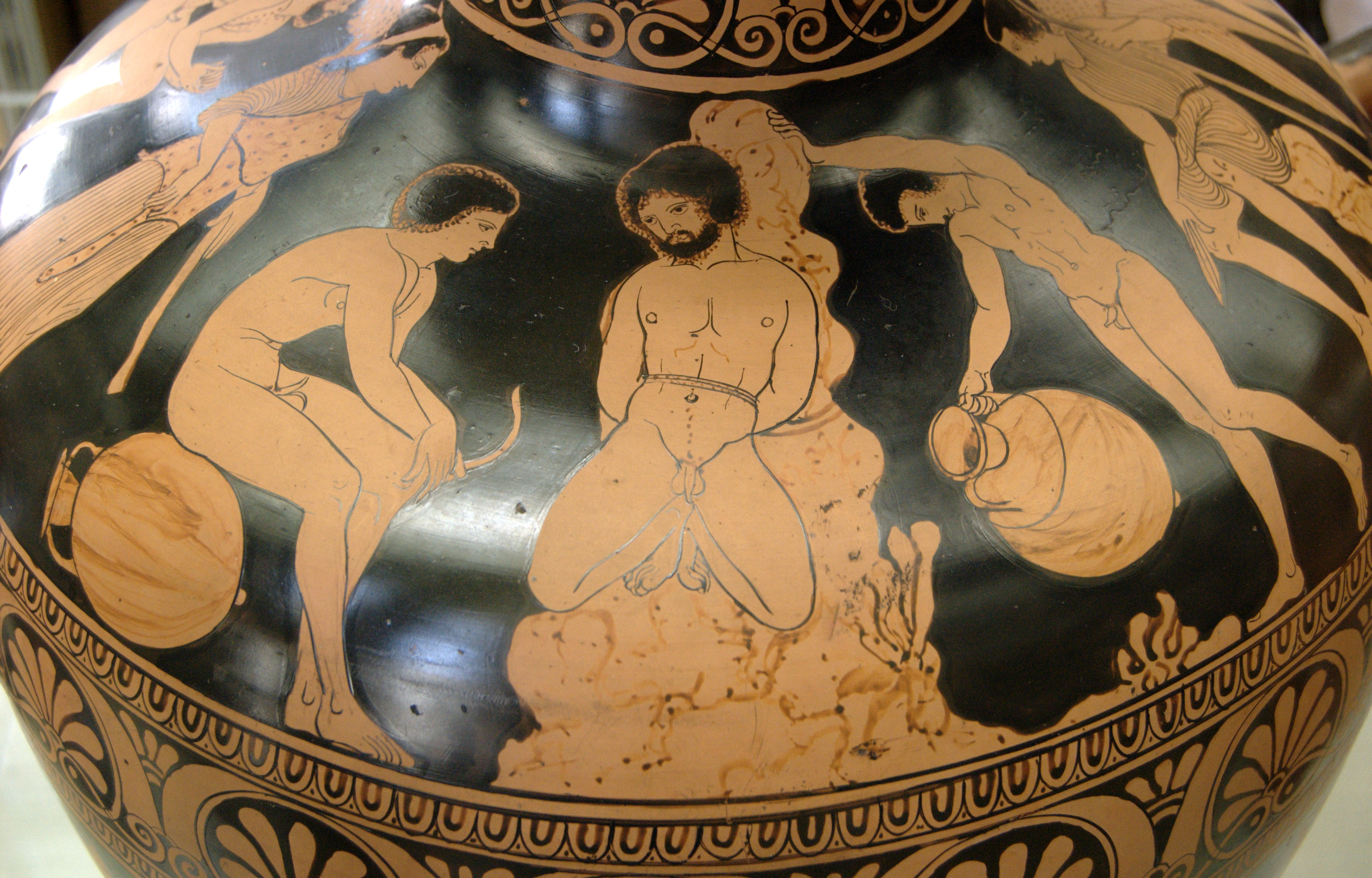
Amycus punished, red-figured Lucanian hydria, end of 4th century BC, Cabinet des Médailles

The Amycos Satyrykos is a fragmentary satyr play by the fifth-century BCE Athenian dramatist Sophocles.

== Content ==
This satyr play almost certainly told the story of the Argonauts and their encounter with Amycus, an inhospitable king in Bithynia, who would challenge travellers to a boxing match before allowing them to draw water for their ships, and invariably killed his opponents. However, upon landing, Polydeuces promptly challenged and defeated the king, and depending on the author, the Argonaut then either killed Amycos or made him swear an oath on his life that he would no longer “maltreat strangers”. Jebb believes another ending, which was related by Periander, wherein Amycos was put in chains, would have been more suitable for a satyr play; unfortunately, it is impossible to say for certain which of these endings was used by Sophocles

== Date ==
Unfortunately, no date more precise than the 5th century BCE can as yet be reliably ascribed to the writing or production of the play.

== Extant Sources ==
Fragments of the Amycos by Sophocles are only found in Athenaeus, Deipnosophists 9, 400B
