= Palodes =

Coastal town of ancient Bithynia

Coordinates: 41°07′26″N 29°05′58″E

Palodes (Ancient Greek: Παλῶδες; "Swamp") was a coastal town of ancient Bithynia located on the Bosphorus.

Its site is located near Sultaniye in Asiatic Turkey.
