= Melia (consort of Poseidon) =

In Greek mythology, Melia or Melie (Ancient Greek: Μελία or Μελίη, romanized: Meliê, lit. 'ash-tree') was a Bithynian nymph, who was, by Poseidon, the mother of Amycus and Mygdon, both kings of the Bebryces. The name Melia perhaps derived from a misreading of a line of Apollonius of Rhodes containing Βιθυνὶς Μελίη, which instead of being read as Melia from Bithynia, might instead be read as Bithynis the Melia, i.e. Bithynis the ash tree nymph.
