= Bebryces =

Ancient people of Bithynia

The Bebryces (Greek: Βέβρυκες) were a tribe of people who lived in Bithynia. According to Strabo they were one of the many Thracian tribes that had crossed from Europe into Asia, although modern scholars have rather argued for a Celtic origin.

== Name ==
Classical linguists considered the name of Bebryces related to the Thracian Bryges, who were later renamed Phryges (Phrygians), based on the geographic proximity, as well as the migration route of the Phrygians known from ancient myths.

B. Sergent suggests that the name Bebryces could be related to the Celtic tribes Bebruces, living in the Pyrenees, and Bibroci, dwelling in Britain, all ultimately stemming from Proto-Celtic *brebu ('beaver'; see Gaulish bebros, bebrus, Old Irish Bibar, 'beaver'). Ivan Duridanov also suggested that the ethnonym was related to Indo-European words meaning "beaver".

The same word denotes beaver in Slavic Languages (*bebrus in Proto-Balto-Slavic, bober in Slovenian, bobar in Bulgarian, bobr in Russian).

== Mythology ==
According to legend they were defeated by Heracles or the Dioscuri, who killed their king, Mygdon or Amycus. Their land was then given to King Lycus of the Mariandynians, who built the city Heraclea there. Some say Amycus was a brother of Mygdon and another Bebrycian king; both were sons of Poseidon and Melia. Greek mythology offers two different accounts for the origin of the name 'Bebryces': either from a woman named Bebryce (Eustath. ad Dionysius Periegetes 805.), or from a hero named Bebryx (or Bebrycus) (Steph. Byz. s.v. Bebrycus). Bebryce is possibly the same as Bryce, a daughter of Danaus, a mythical King of Libya and Arabia (Apollodorus). Bebryx was also the father of Pyrene.
