= Amykos =

Character in Greek mythology

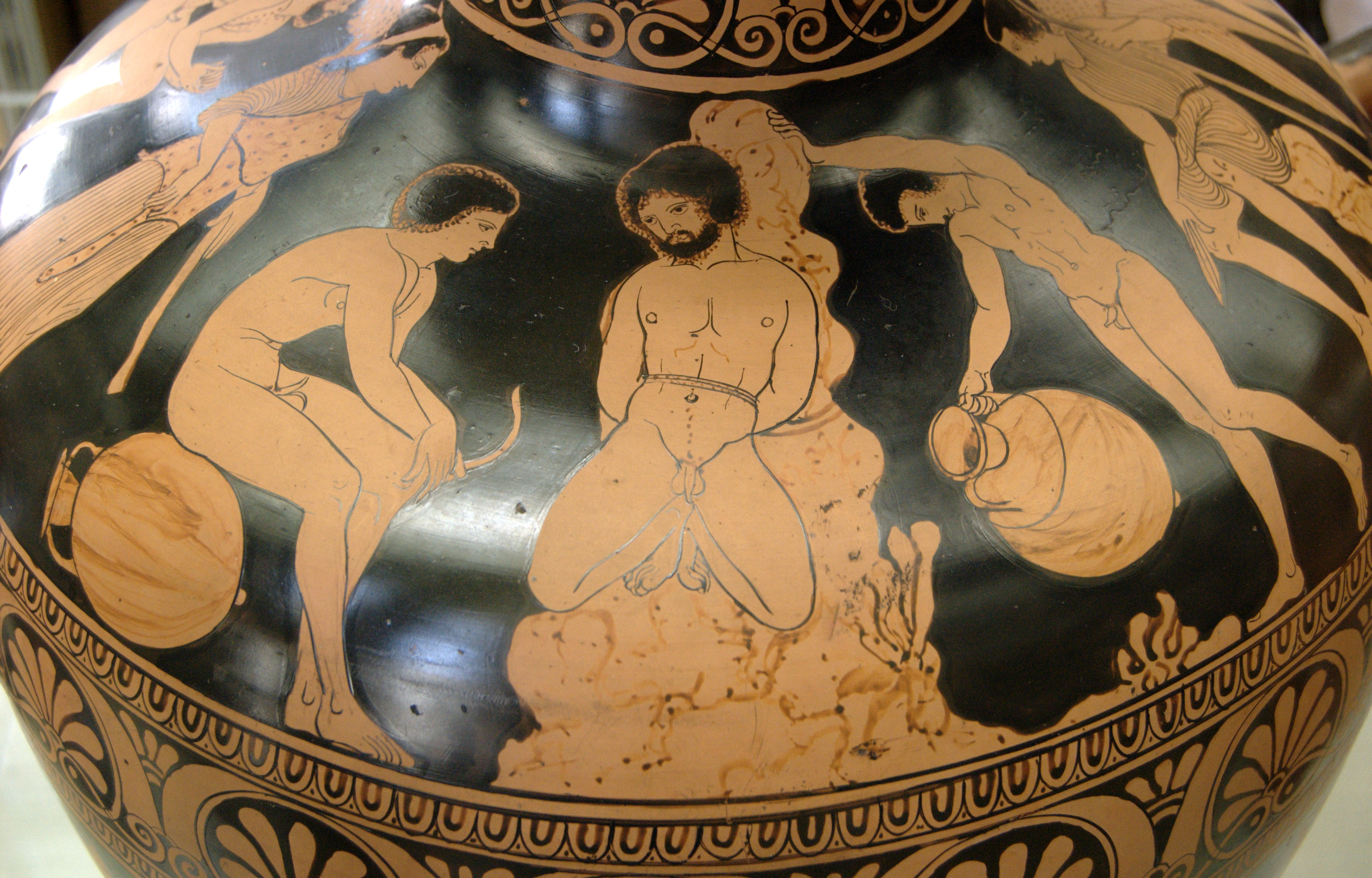
Amycus punished, red-figured Lucanian hydria, end of 4th century BC, Cabinet des Médailles

In Greek mythology, Amykos (Ancient Greek: Ἄμυκος), Latinized as Amycus, was the king of the Bebryces, a mythical people in Bithynia.

== Family ==
Amycus was the son of Poseidon and the Bithynian nymph Melia.

== Mythology ==
Amycus was a doughty man but being a king he compelled strangers to box as a way of killing them. When the Argonauts passed through Bithynia, Amycus challenged the best man of the crew to a boxing match. Polydeuces undertook to box against him and killed him with a blow on the elbow.

When the Bebryces rush to avenge him, the chiefs snatched up their arms and put them to flight with great slaughter.

== Bay/Port ==
During ancient times, the bay at modern Beykoz was called Amykos.
