= Polyphemus =

Son of Poseidon and Thoosa in Greek mythology

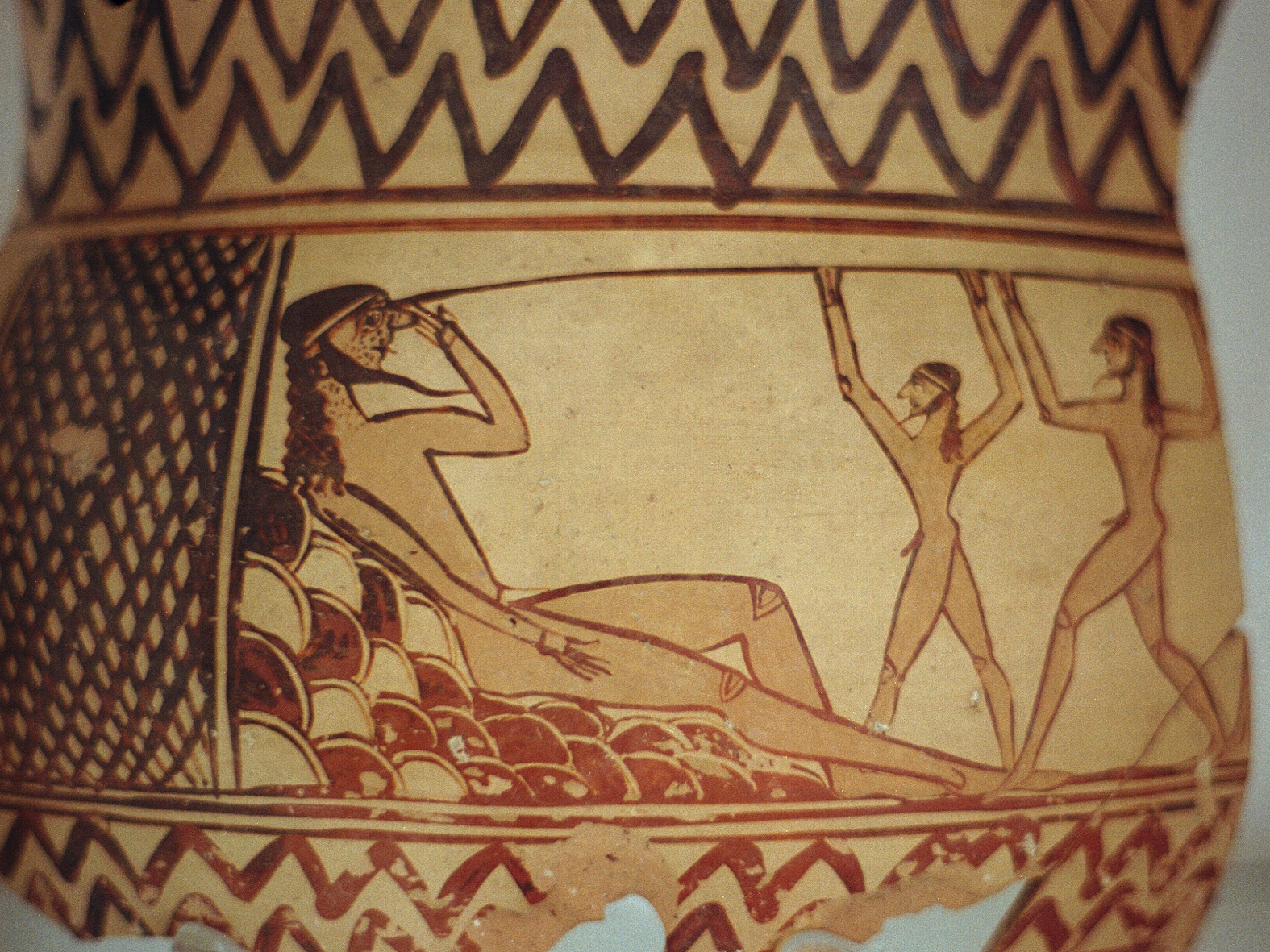
- Polyphemus' blinding on a clay krater, mid-7th century BC, Archaeological Museum of Argos

Creature information
- Grouping: Cyclopes
- Family: Poseidon (father); Thoosa (mother)
- Folklore: Greek mythology

Origin
- First attested: Odyssey
- Region: Sicily

Polyphemus (/ˌpɒliˈfiːməs/; Ancient Greek: Πολύφημος, romanized: Polúphēmos, Epic Greek: [polypʰɛːmos]; Latin: Polyphēmus [pɔlʏˈpʰeːmʊs]) is the one-eyed giant son of Poseidon and Thoosa in Greek mythology, one of the Cyclopes described in Homer's Odyssey. His name can mean either "abounding in songs and legends", "many-voiced", or "very famous".

Polyphemus first appeared as a savage man-eating giant in the ninth book of the Odyssey. The satyr play Cyclops by Euripides is dependent on this episode with some differences in the story and while also being more comedic in nature. Later Classical writers that presented him in their poems linked his name with the nymph Galatea as he tried to seduce her. Often he was portrayed as unsuccessful in these, and as unaware of his disproportionate size and musical failings. In the work of even later authors, however, he is presented as both a successful lover and skilled musician. From the Renaissance on, art and literature reflect all of these interpretations of the giant.

== Odysseus and Polyphemus ==
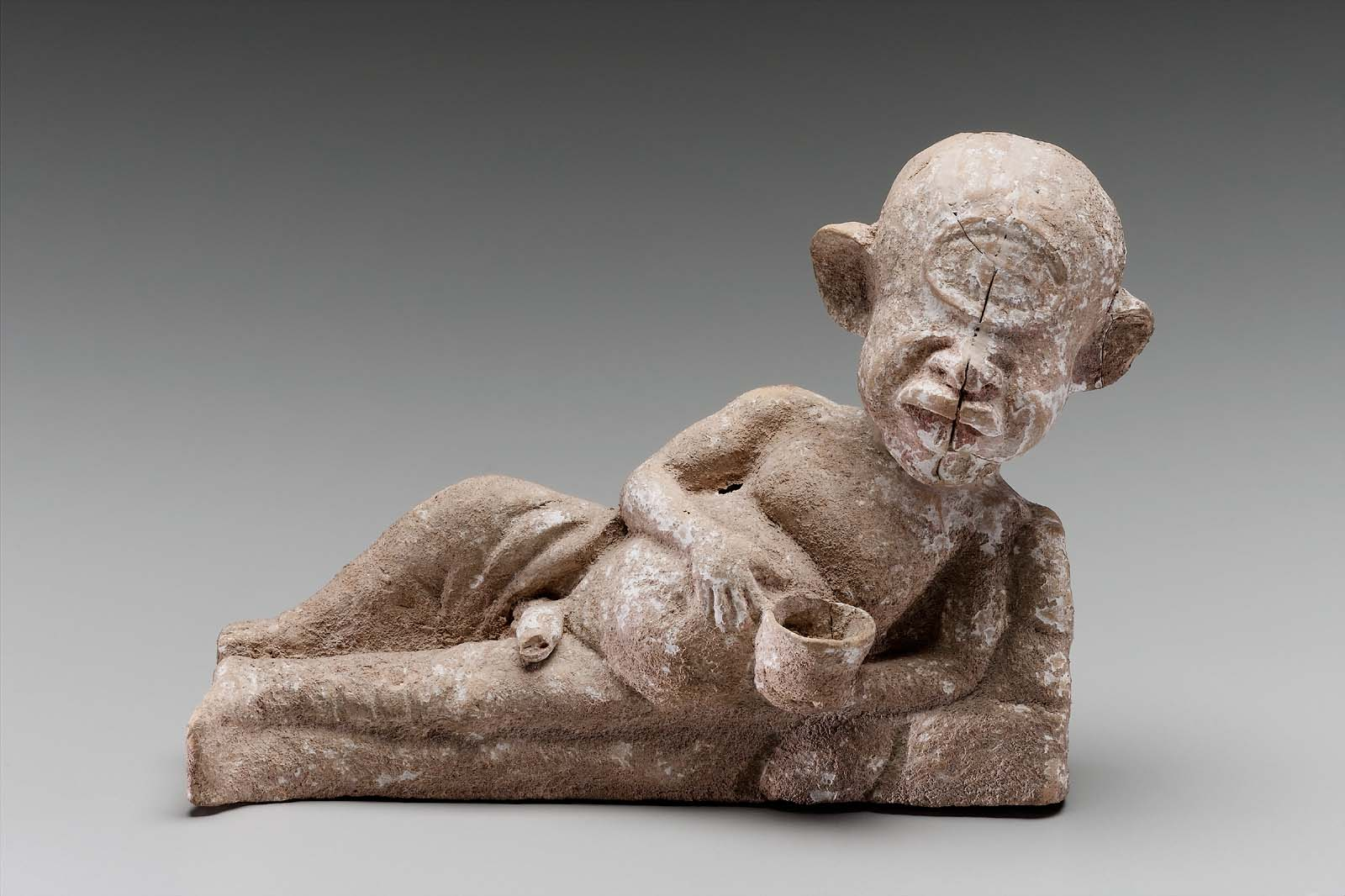
Greek terracotta figurine, Polyphemos reclining and holding a drinking bowl. Late 5th to early 4th century BC, Boeotia. Museum of Fine Arts, Boston.

=== Ancient sources ===
In Homer's epic, Odysseus lands on the island of the Cyclopes during his journey home from the Trojan War and, together with some of his men, enters a cave filled with provisions. When the giant Polyphemus returns home with his flocks, he blocks the entrance with a great stone and, scorning the usual custom of hospitality, eats two of the men. The next morning, the Cyclops kills and eats two more of Odysseus' men before leaving the cave to graze his sheep.

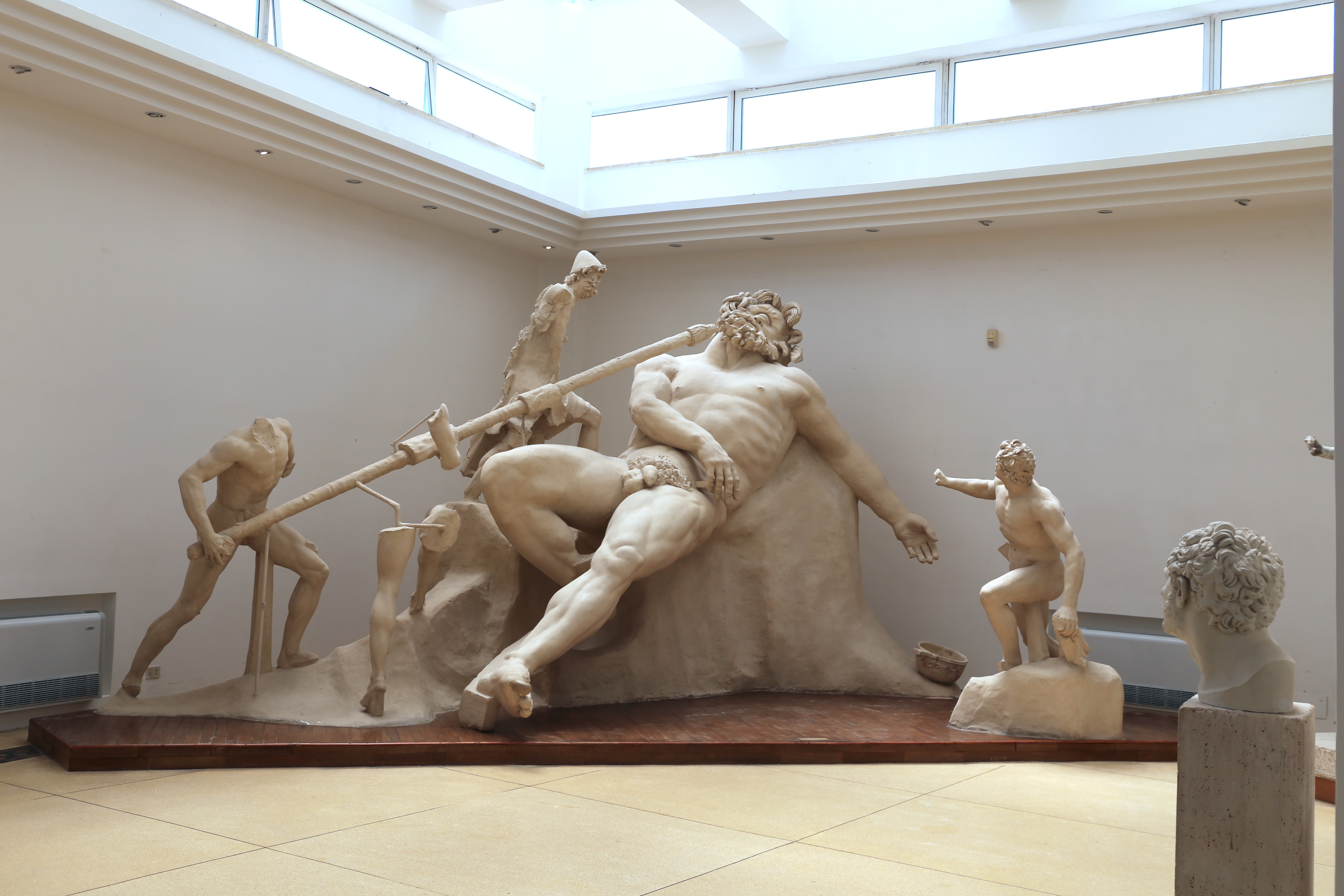
The blinding of Polyphemus, a reconstruction from the villa of Tiberius at Sperlonga, 1st century AD

After the giant returns in the evening and eats two more of the men, Odysseus offers Polyphemus some strong and undiluted wine given to him earlier on his journey. Drunk and unwary, the giant asks Odysseus his name, promising him a guest-gift if he answers. Odysseus tells him "Οὖτις", which means "nobody", and Polyphemus promises to eat this "Nobody" last of all. With that, he falls into a drunken sleep. Odysseus and his men take a wooden stake they had earlier hardened in the fire, return it to the fire until it is glowing hot, and drive it into Polyphemus's eye. When Polyphemus shouts for help from his fellow giants, saying that "Nobody" has hurt him, they think Polyphemus is being afflicted by divine power and recommend prayer as the answer.

In the morning, the blind Cyclops lets the sheep out to graze, feeling their backs to ensure that the men are not escaping. However, Odysseus and his men have tied themselves to the undersides of the animals and so get away. As he sails off with his men, Odysseus boastfully reveals his real name, an act of hubris that was to cause problems for him later. Polyphemus prays to his father, Poseidon, for revenge and casts huge rocks towards the ship, which Odysseus barely dodges.

The story reappears in later Classical literature. In Cyclops, the 5th-century BC play by Euripides, a chorus of satyrs offers comic relief from the grisly story of how Polyphemus is punished for his impious behaviour in not respecting the rites of hospitality. Euripides' Polyphemus is depicted as sophisticated and intellectually analogous to sophists of Euripides' time. In Cyclops both Odysseus and the Cyclops employ deft and appropriative rhetorical manipulation, "aggressive sophistry that reduces men to meat, and fine talk to deceptive barter". In this play, Polyphemus claims to be a pederast, and tries to take the satyr Silenus, whom he kept together with his sons as slaves on Mount Etna in Sicily, calling him "my Ganymede". The scene is infused with low comedy, specifically from the chorus, and Polyphemus is made to look silly: he is drunk when he explains his sexual desire, Silenus is too old to play the part of the young lover, and he himself will be subjected to penetration—with the wooden spike.

In his Latin epic, Virgil describes how Aeneas observes blind Polyphemus as he leads his flocks down to the sea. They have encountered Achaemenides, who re-tells the story of how Odysseus and his men escaped, leaving him behind. The giant is described as descending to the shore, using a "lopped pine tree" as a walking staff. Once Polyphemus reaches the sea, he washes his oozing, bloody eye socket and groans painfully. Achaemenides is taken aboard Aeneas's vessel and they cast off with Polyphemus in chase. His great roar of frustration brings the rest of the Cyclopes down to the shore as Aeneas draws away in fear.

According to a Latin translation of the now lost work of Dictys Cretensis, an account that differs from the Odyssey, Polyphemus and Antiphates were the sons of two brothers named Cyclops and Laestrygon. They killed many of Odysseus' men on Sicily, but eventually granted them a truce. However, this truce was broken when a member of Odysseus' crew, Alphenor, fell in love with the daughter of Polyphemus, Arene, and tried to carry her off. Polyphemus recovered his daughter and drove the Greeks away.

The lost account of Sisyphus the Coan, cited by John Malalas in his Chronography, introduces Polyphemus, Antiphates, and Cyclops as the three sons born to King Sicanus of Sicily. Similar to Dictys, Polyphemus first battles with Odysseus, but grants his sympathy after Odysseus explains his journey from Troy. However, the daughter of Polyphemus, now called Elpe, falls in love with a member of Odysseus' crew named Leion. Elpe is kidnapped as favorable winds came by, and the Greeks leave Sicily without issue.

=== Artistic representations ===
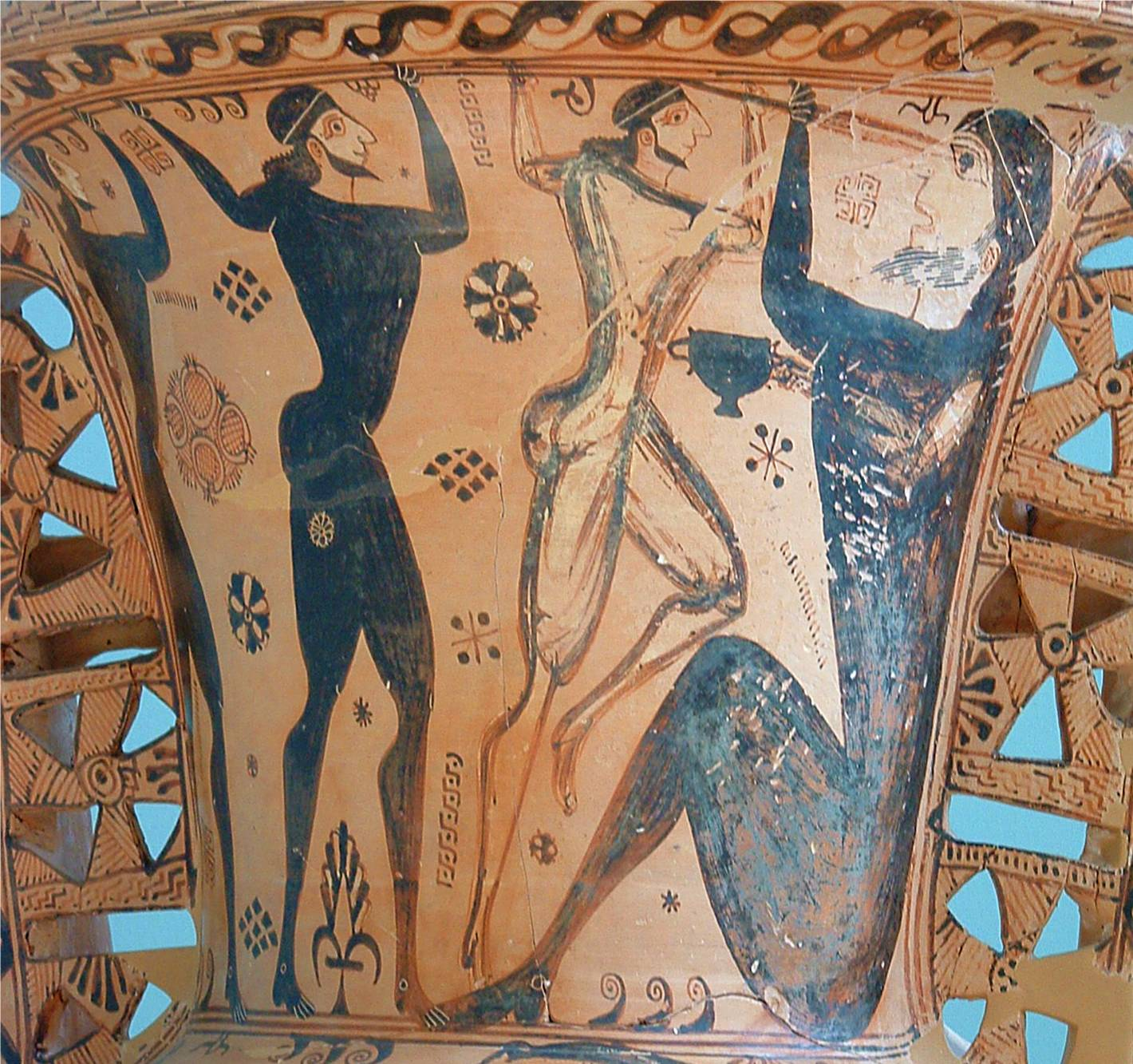
Painting of Odysseus and his men blinding Polyphemus (from Eleusis Amphora by Polyphemos Painter, Eleusis museum)

The blinding of Polyphemus and the ruse by which Odysseus and his men escaped his cave are the only two scenes from the Odyssey shown on vases surviving from the seventh century BC (later pottery shows a much wider variety of scenes from the Odyssey). One such episode, on a vase featuring the hero carried beneath a sheep, was used on a 27 drachma Greek postage stamp in 1983.

The blinding was depicted in life-size sculpture, including a giant Polyphemus, in the Sperlonga sculptures probably made for the Emperor Tiberius. This may be an interpretation of an existing composition, and was apparently repeated in variations in later Imperial palaces by Claudius, Nero and at Hadrian's Villa.

Of the European painters of the subject, the Flemish Jacob Jordaens depicted Odysseus escaping from the cave of Polyphemus in 1635 (see gallery below) and others chose the dramatic scene of the giant casting boulders at the escaping ship. In Guido Reni's painting of 1639/40 (see above), the furious giant is tugging a boulder from the cliff as Odysseus and his men row out to the ship far below. Polyphemus is portrayed, as it often happens, with two empty eye sockets and his damaged eye located in the middle on his forehead. This convention goes back to Greek statuary and painting, and is reproduced in Johann Heinrich Wilhelm Tischbein's 1802 head and shoulders portrait of the giant (see below).

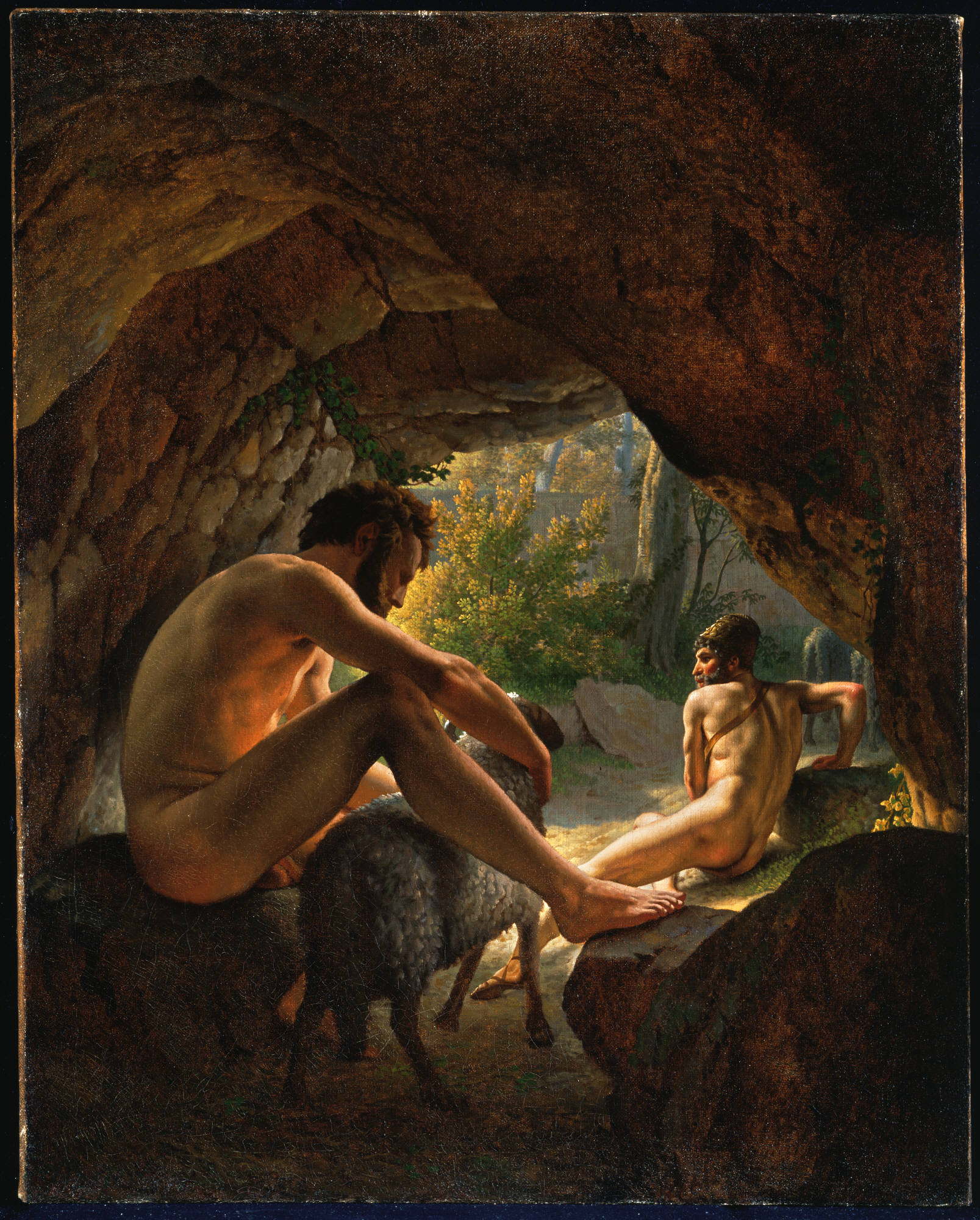
Christoffer Wilhelm Eckersberg, Ulysses Fleeing the Cave of Polyphemus, 1812, Princeton University Art Museum

Arnold Böcklin pictures the giant as standing on rocks onshore and swinging one of them back as the men row desperately over a surging wave (see below), while Polyphemus is standing at the top of a cliff in Jean-Léon Gérôme's painting of 1902. He stands poised, having already thrown one stone, which barely misses the ship. The reason for his rage is depicted in J. M. W. Turner's painting, Ulysses Deriding Polyphemus (1829). Here the ship sails forward as the sun breaks free of clouds low on the horizon. The giant himself is an indistinct shape barely distinguished from the woods and smoky atmosphere high above.

=== Possible origins ===
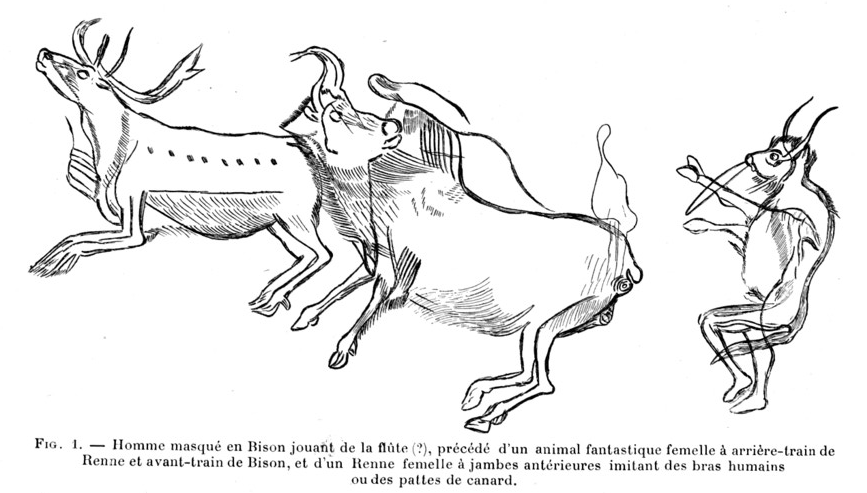
The upright bison-man (far-right) depicted in one of the prehistoric paintings at the Cave of the Trois-Frères is possibly, according to one interpretation, a proto-Polyphemus figure.

Folktales similar to that of Homer's Polyphemus are a widespread phenomenon throughout the ancient world. In 1857, Wilhelm Grimm collected versions in Serbian, Romanian, Estonian, Finnish, Russian, German, and others; versions in Basque, Sámi, Lithuanian, Gascon, Syriac, and Celtic are also known. More than two hundred different versions have been identified, from around twenty five nations, covering a geographic region extending from Iceland, Ireland, England, Portugal and Africa to Arabia, Turkey, Russia, and Korea. (Note: For examples of the story from the Caucasus, see "Legends About Shepherds, Including Cyclops Legends".) The consensus of current modern scholarship is that these "Polyphemus legends" preserve traditions predating Homer.

It has also been theorized that the story of Polyphemus originated during the Paleolithic and is connected to the prehistoric guardian-type figure of the "lord of animals". Similar tales have also been identified among several indigenous North American peoples.

== Polyphemus and Galatea ==
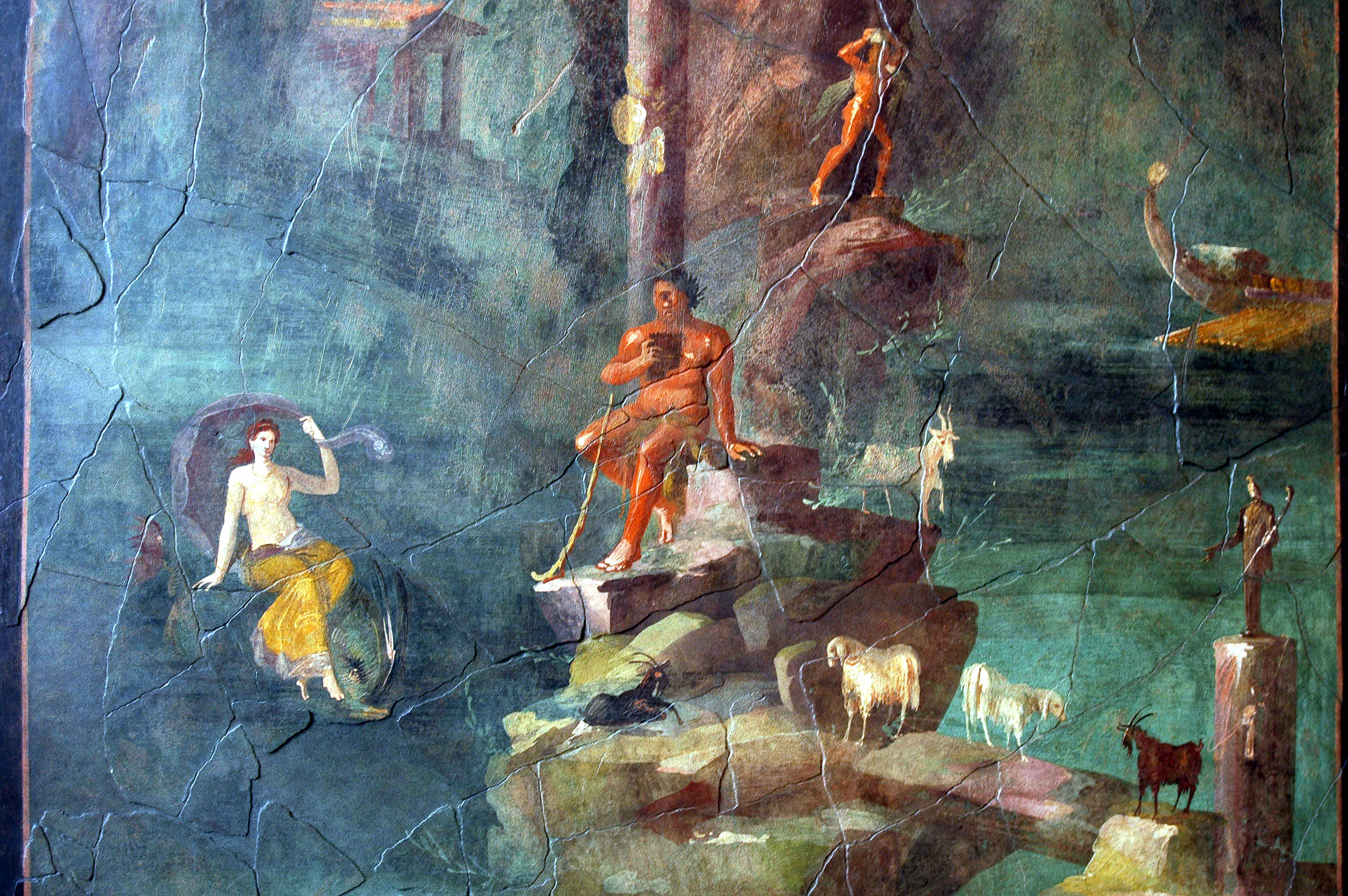
Detail of Galatea and Polyphemus. From Boscotrecase. Metropolitan Museum of Art, New York. Last decade of the 1st century BCE

=== Ancient sources ===
==== Philoxenus of Cythera ====
Writing more than three centuries after the Odyssey is thought to have been composed, Philoxenus of Cythera took up the myth of Polyphemus in his poem Cyclops or Galatea. The poem was written to be performed as a dithyramb, of which only fragments have survived, and was perhaps the first to provide a female love interest for the Cyclops. (Note: That Polyphemus's love for Galatea is "possibly" a Philoxenus innovation.) The object of Polyphemus's romantic desire is a sea nymph named Galatea. In the poem, Polyphemus is not a cave dwelling, monstrous brute, as in the Odyssey, but instead he is rather like Odysseus himself in his vision of the world: He has weaknesses, he is adept at literary criticism, and he understands people.

The date of composition for the Cyclops is not precisely known, but it must be prior to 388 BC, when Aristophanes parodied it in his comedy Plutus (Wealth); and probably after 406 BC, when Dionysius I became tyrant of Syracuse. Philoxenus lived in that city and was the court poet of Dionysius I. According to ancient commentators, either because of his frankness regarding Dionysius's poetry, or because of a conflict with the tyrant over a female aulos player named Galatea, Philoxenus was imprisoned in the quarries and had there composed his Cyclops in the manner of a Roman à clef, where the poem's characters, Polyphemus, Odysseus and Galatea, were meant to represent Dionysius, Philoxenus, and the aulos-player. Philoxenus had his Polyphemus perform on the cithara, a professional lyre requiring great skill. The Cyclops playing such a sophisticated and fashionable instrument would have been quite a surprising juxtaposition for Philoxenus's audience.

Philoxenus's Cyclops is also referred to in Aristotle's Poetics in a section that discusses representations of people in tragedy and comedy, citing as comedic examples the Cyclops of both Timotheus and Philoxenus.

==== Aristophanes ====
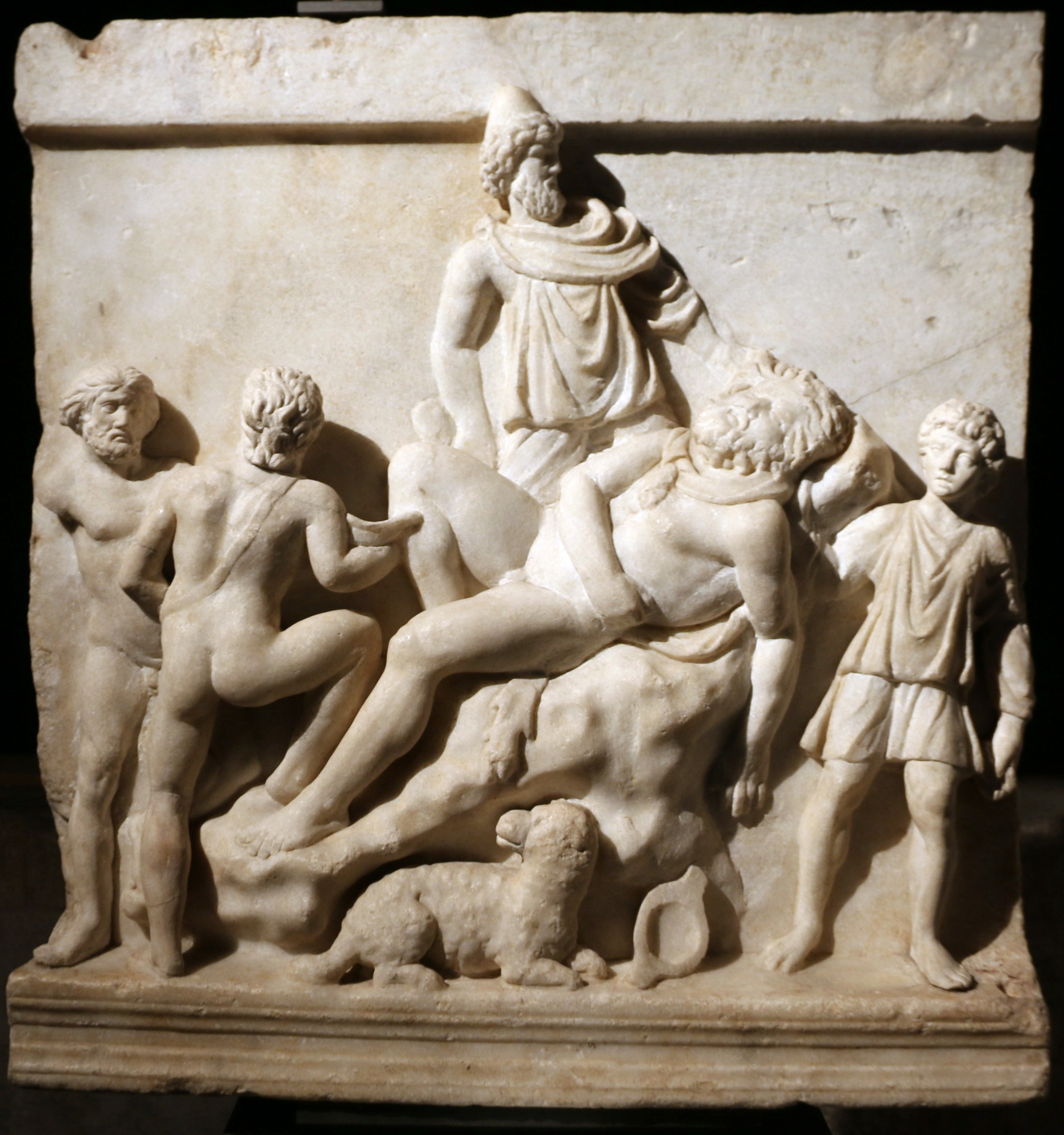
Polyphemus's blinding by Odysseus and his men on a 2nd-century Roman sarcophagus, Castello Ursino Museum.

The text of Aristophanes's last extant play Plutus (Wealth) has survived with almost all of its choral odes missing. What remains shows Aristophanes (as he does to some extent in all his plays) parodying a contemporary literary work — in this case Philoxenus's Cyclops. While making fun of literary aspects of Philoxenus's dithyramb, Aristophanes is at the same time commenting on musical developments occurring in the fourth century BC, developing themes that run through the whole play. It also contains lines and phrases taken directly from the Cyclops.

The slave Cario, tells the chorus that his master has brought home with him the god Wealth, and because of this they will all now be rich. The chorus wants to dance for joy, so Cario takes the lead by parodying Philoxenus's Cyclops. As a solo performer leading a chorus that sings and dances, Cario recreates the form of a dithyramb. He first casts himself in the role of Polyphemus while assigning to the chorus the roles of sheep and goats, at the same time imitating the sound of a lyre: "And now I wish — threttanello! — to imitate the Cyclops and, swinging my feet to and fro like this, to lead you in the dance. But come on, children, shout and shout again the songs of bleating sheep and smelly goats." The chorus, however, does not want to play sheep and goats, they would rather be Odysseus and his men, and they threaten to blind Cario (as had Odysseus the drunken Cyclops) with a wooden stake.

==== Hellenistic pastoral poets ====
The romantic element, originated by Philoxenus, was revived by later Hellenistic poets, including Theocritus, Callimachus, Hermesianax, and Bion of Smyrna.

Theocritus is credited with creating the genre of pastoral poetry. His works are titled Idylls and of these Idyll XI tells the story of the Cyclops' love for Galatea. Though the character of Polyphemus derives from Homer, there are notable differences. Where Homer's Cyclops was beastly and wicked, Theocritus's is absurd, lovesick and comic. Polyphemus loves the sea nymph Galatea, but she rejects him because of his ugliness. However, in a borrowing from Philoxenus's poem, Polyphemus has discovered that music will heal lovesickness, and so he plays the panpipes and sings of his woes, for "I am skilled in piping as no other Cyclops here". His longing is to overcome the antithetic elements that divide them, he of earth and she of water:

Ah me, would that my mother at my birth had given me gills, That so I might have dived down to your side and kissed your hand, If your lips you would not let me...

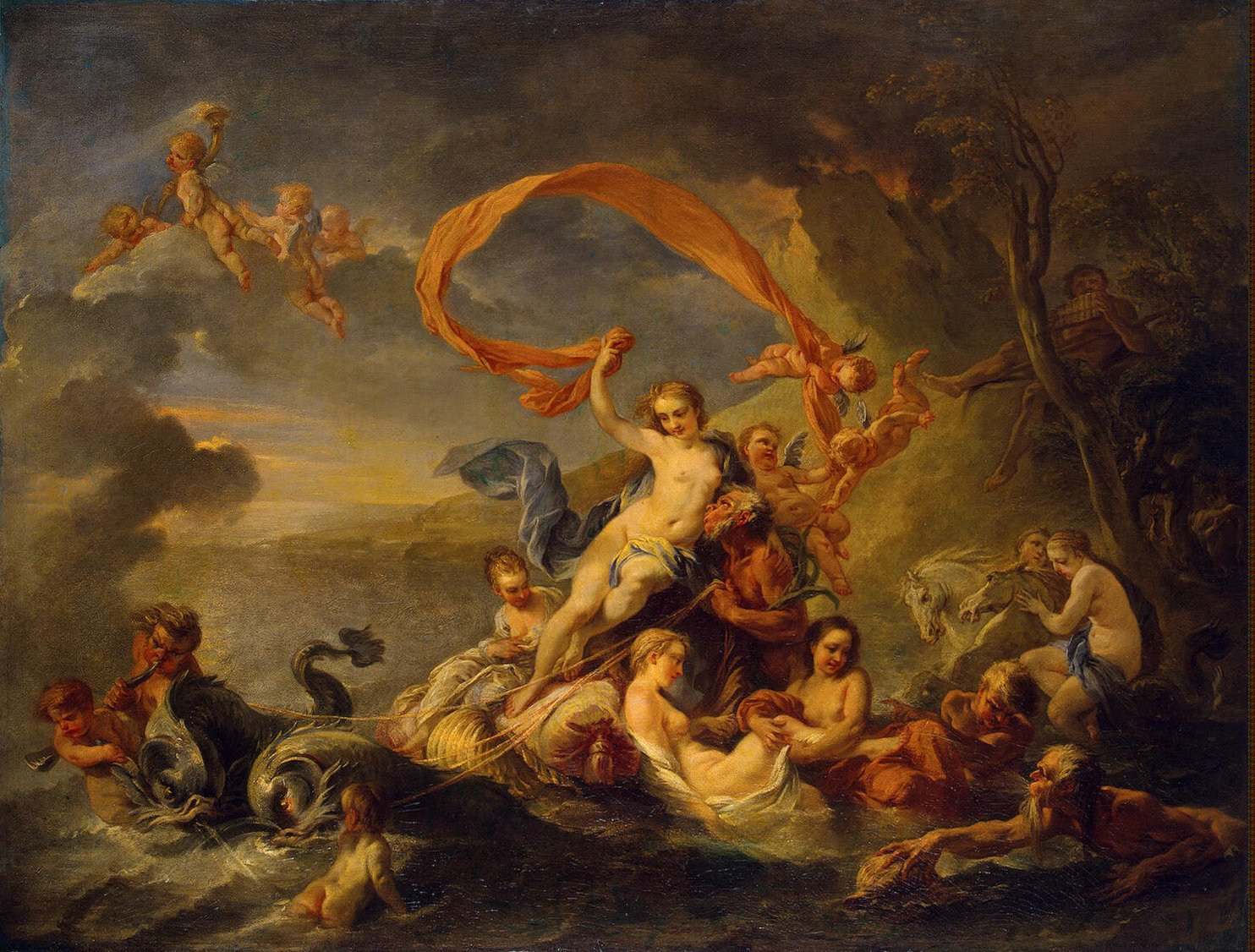
Jean-Baptiste van Loo's depiction of "The Triumph of Galatea"; Polyphemus plays the pan-pipes on the right

The love of the mismatched pair was later taken up by other pastoral poets. The same trope of music being the cure for love was introduced by Callimachus in his Epigram 47: "How excellent was the charm that Polyphemus discovered for the lover. By Earth, the Cyclops was no fool!" A fragment of a lost idyll by Bion also portrays Polyphemus declaring his undying love for Galatea. Referring back to this, an elegy on Bion's death that was once attributed to Moschus takes the theme further in a piece of hyperbole. Where Polyphemus had failed, the poet declares, Bion's greater artistry had won Galatea's heart, drawing her from the sea to tend his herds. This reflected the situation in Idyll VI of Theocritus. There two herdsmen engage in a musical competition, one of them playing the part of Polyphemus, who asserts that since he has adopted the ruse of ignoring Galatea, she has now become the one who pursues him.

==== Latin poets ====
The successful outcome of Polyphemus's love was also alluded to in the course of a 1st-century BC love elegy on the power of music by the Latin poet Propertius. Listed among the examples he mentions is that "Even Galatea, it's true, below wild Etna, wheeled her brine-wet horses, Polyphemus, to your songs." The division of contrary elements between the land-based monster and the sea nymph, lamented in Theocritus's Idyll 11, is brought into harmony by this means.

While Ovid's treatment of the story that he introduced into the Metamorphoses is reliant on the idylls of Theocritus, (Note: Alan Griffin calls Ovid's treatment "an extended paraphrase of Theocritus' two idylls.") it is complicated by the introduction of Acis, who has now become the focus of Galatea's love.

While I pursued him with a constant love,
the Cyclops followed me as constantly.
And, should you ask me, I could not declare
whether my hatred of him, or my love
of Acis was the stronger. —They were equal.

There is also a reversion to the Homeric vision of the hulking monster, whose attempt to play the tender shepherd singing love songs is made a source of humour by Galatea:

Now, Polyphemus, wretched Cyclops, you
are careful of appearance, and you try
the art of pleasing. You have even combed
your stiffened hair with rakes: it pleases you
to trim your shaggy beard with a reaping hook.

In his own character, too, Polyphemus mentions the transgression of heavenly laws that once characterised his actions and is now overcome by Galatea: "I, who scorn Jove and his heaven and his piercing lightning bolt, submit to you alone."

Galatea listens to the love song of Polyphemus while she and Acis lie hidden by a rock. In his song, Polyphemus scolds her for not loving him in return, offers her rustic gifts and points out what he considers his best feature — the single eye that is, he boasts, the size of a great shield. But when Polyphemus discovers the hiding place of the lovers, he becomes enraged with jealousy. Galatea, terrified, dives into the ocean, while the Cyclops wrenches off a piece of the mountain and crushes Acis with it. But on her return, Galatea changes her dead lover into the spirit of the Sicilian river Acis.

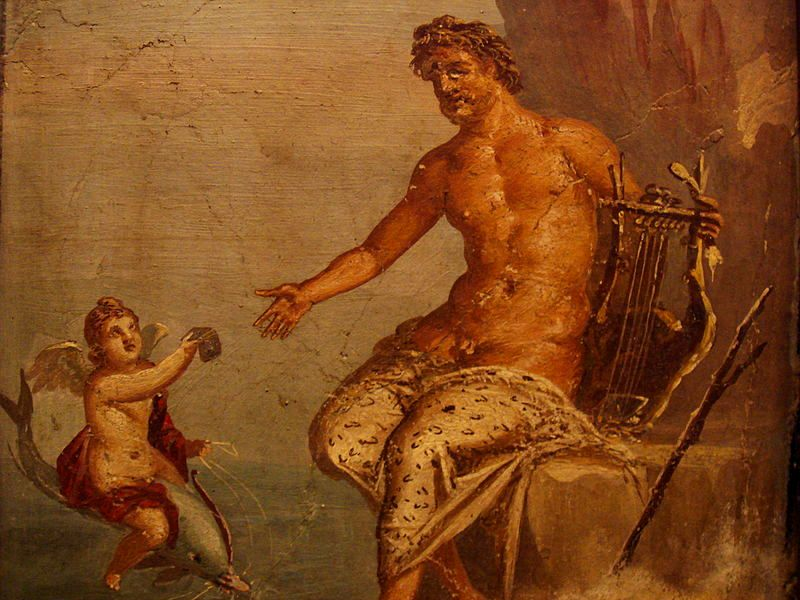
Polyphemus receives a love-letter from Galatea, a 1st-century AD fresco from Pompeii

==== First-century AD art ====
That the story sometimes had a more successful outcome for Polyphemus is also attested in the arts. In one of the murals rescued from the site of Pompeii, Polyphemus is pictured seated on a rock with a cithara (rather than a syrinx) by his side, holding out a hand to receive a love letter from Galatea, which is carried by a winged Cupid riding on a dolphin.

In another fresco, also dating from the 1st century AD, the two stand locked in a naked embrace (see below). From their union came the ancestors of various wild and war-like races. According to some accounts, the Celts (Galati in Latin, Γάλλοi in Greek) were descended from their son Galatos, while Appian credited them with three children, Celtus, Illyrius and Galas, from whom descend the Celts, the Illyrians and the Gauls respectively.

==== Lucian ====
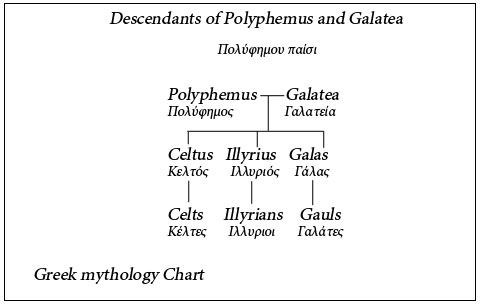
Offspring of Polyphemus and Galatea

There are indications that Polyphemus's courtship also had a more successful outcome in one of the dialogues of Lucian of Samosata. There Doris, one of Galatea's sisters, spitefully congratulates her on her love conquest and she defends Polyphemus. From the conversation, one understands that Doris is chiefly jealous that her sister has a lover. Galatea admits that she does not love Polyphemus but is pleased to have been chosen by him in preference to all her companions.

==== Nonnus ====
That their conjunction was fruitful is also implied in a later Greek epic from the turn of the 5th century AD. In the course of his Dionysiaca, Nonnus gives an account of the wedding of Poseidon and Beroe, at which the Nereid "Galatea twangled a marriage dance and restlessly twirled in capering step, and she sang the marriage verses, for she had learnt well how to sing, being taught by Polyphemos with a shepherd's syrinx."

=== Later European interpretations ===
==== Literature and music ====
During Renaissance and Baroque times Ovid's story emerged again as a popular theme. In Spain Luis de Góngora y Argote wrote the much admired narrative poem, Fábula de Polifemo y Galatea, published in 1627. It is particularly noted for its depiction of landscape and for the sensual description of the love of Acis and Galatea. It was written in homage to an earlier and rather shorter narrative with the same title by Luis Carillo y Sotomayor (1611). (Note: Spanish text online Archived 12 May 2013 at the Wayback Machine) The story was also given operatic treatment in the very popular zarzuela of Antoni Lliteres Carrió (1708). The atmosphere here is lighter and enlivened by the inclusion of the clowns Momo and Tisbe.

In France the story was condensed to the fourteen lines of Tristan L'Hermite's sonnet "Polyphème en furie" (1641). In it the giant expresses his fury upon viewing the loving couple, ultimately throwing the huge rock that kills Acis and even injures Galatea. Later in the century, Jean-Baptiste Lully composed his opera Acis et Galatée (1686) on the theme. (Note: Excerpts from Jean-Baptiste Lully's 1686 opera, Acis et Galatée at PrestoClassical)

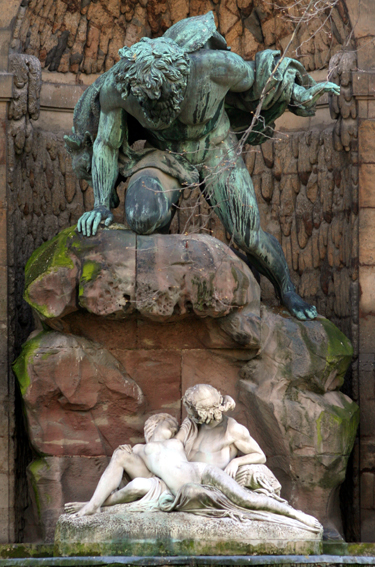
Polyphemus discovers Galatea and Acis, statues by Auguste Ottin in the Jardin du Luxembourg's Médici Fountain, 1866

In Italy Giovanni Bononcini composed the one-act opera Polifemo (1703). Shortly afterwards George Frideric Handel worked in that country and composed the cantata Aci, Galatea e Polifemo (1708), laying as much emphasis on the part of Polifemo as on the lovers. Written in Italian, Polifemo's deep bass solo "Fra l'ombre e gl'orrori" (From horrid shades) establishes his character from the start. After Handel's move to England, he gave the story a new treatment in his pastoral opera Acis and Galatea with an English libretto provided by John Gay. (Note: The text is on the Stanford University site.) Initially composed in 1718, the work went through many revisions and was later to be given updated orchestrations by both Mozart and Mendelssohn. As a pastoral work it is suffused with Theocritan atmosphere but largely centres on the two lovers. When Polyphemus declares his love in the lyric "O ruddier than the cherry", the effect is almost comic. (Note: There is a performance of Acis and Galatea- Polyphemus: 'O ruddier than the cherry' by G. F. Handel on YouTube.) Handel's rival for a while on the London scene, Nicola Porpora, also made the story the subject of his opera Polifemo (1735).

Later in the century Joseph Haydn composed Acide e Galatea (1763) as his first opera while in Vienna. (Note: Brief excerpts at Classical Archives) Designed for an imperial wedding, it was given a happy ending centred on the transformation scene after the murder of Acis as the pair declare their undying love. Johann Gottlieb Naumann was to turn the story into a comic opera, Aci e Galatea, with the subtitle i ciclopi amanti (the amorous cyclops). The work was first performed in Dresden in 1801 and its plot was made more complicated by giving Polifemo a companion, Orgonte. There were also two other lovers, Dorinda and Lisia, with Orgonte Lisia's rival for Dorinda's love. (Note: There is a performance of Polifemo's aria Fulmine che dal Cielo on YouTube)

After John Gay's libretto in Britain, it was not until the 19th century that the subject was given further poetical treatment. In 1819 appeared The Death of Acis by Bryan Procter, writing under the name of Barry Cornwall. A blank verse narrative with lyric episodes, it celebrates the musicianship of Polyphemus, which draws the lovers to expose themselves from their hiding place in a cave and thus brings about the death of Acis. At the other end of the century, there was Alfred Austin's dramatic poem "Polyphemus", which is set after the murder and transformation of the herdsman. The giant is tortured by hearing the happy voices of Galatea and Acis as they pursue their love duet. Shortly afterwards Albert Samain wrote the 2-act verse drama Polyphème with the additional character of Lycas, Galatea's younger brother. In this the giant is humanised; sparing the lovers when he discovers them, he blinds himself and wades to his death in the sea. The play was first performed posthumously in 1904 with incidental music by Raymond Bonheur. On this the French composer Jean Cras based his operatic 'lyric tragedy' Polyphème, composed in 1914 and first performed in 1922. Cras took Samain's text almost unchanged, subdividing the play's two acts into four and cutting a few lines from Polyphemus's final speech.

There have also been two Spanish musical items that reference Polyphemus's name. Reginald Smith Brindle's four fragments for guitar, El Polifemo de Oro (1956), takes its title from Federico García Lorca's poem, "The riddle of the guitar". That speaks of six dancing maidens (the guitar strings) entranced by 'a golden Polyphemus' (the one-eyed sound-hole). The Spanish composer Andres Valero Castells takes the inspiration for his Polifemo i Galatea from Gongora's work. Originally written for brass band in 2001, he rescored it for orchestra in 2006.

==== Painting and sculpture ====
Paintings that include Polyphemus in the story of Acis and Galatea can be grouped according to their themes. Most notably the story takes place within a pastoral landscape in which the figures are almost incidental. This is particularly so in Nicolas Poussin's 1649 "Landscape with Polyphemus" (see gallery below) in which the lovers play a minor part in the foreground. To the right, Polyphemus merges with a distant mountain top on which he plays his pipes. In an earlier painting by Poussin from 1630 (now housed at the Dublin National Gallery) the couple are among several embracing figures in the foreground, shielded from view of Polyphemus, who is playing his flute higher up the slope. Another variation on the theme was painted by Pietro Dandini during this period.

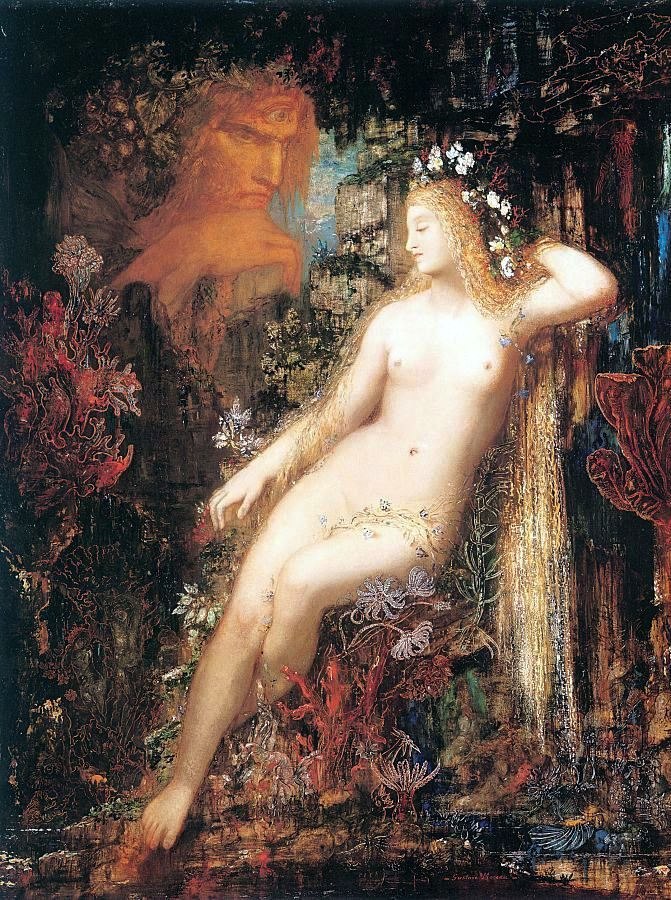
Polyphemus spies on the sleeping Galatea, Gustave Moreau (1880)

An earlier fresco by Giulio Romano from 1528 seats Polyphemus against a rocky foreground with a lyre in his raised right hand. The lovers can just be viewed through a gap in the rock that gives onto the sea at the lower right. Corneille Van Clève (1681) represents a seated Polyphemus in his sculpture, except that in his version it is pipes that the giant holds in his lowered hand. Otherwise he has a massive club held across his body and turns to the left to look over his shoulder.

Other paintings take up the Theocritan theme of the pair divided by the elements with which they are identified, land and water. There are a series of paintings, often titled "The Triumph of Galatea", in which the nymph is carried through the sea by her Nereid sisters, while a minor figure of Polyphemus serenades her from the land. Typical examples of this were painted by François Perrier, Giovanni Lanfranco and Jean-Baptiste van Loo.

A whole series of paintings by Gustave Moreau make the same point in a variety of subtle ways. The giant spies on Galatea through the wall of a sea grotto or emerges from a cliff to adore her sleeping figure (see below). Again, Polyphemus merges with the cliff where he meditates in the same way that Galatea merges with her element within the grotto in the painting at Musée d'Orsay. The visionary interpretation of the story also finds its echo in Odilon Redon's 1913 painting The Cyclops in which the giant towers over the slope on which Galatea sleeps.

French sculptors have also been responsible for some memorable versions. Auguste Ottin's separate figures are brought together in an 1866 fountain in the Luxembourg Garden. Above is crouched the figure of Polyphemus in weathered bronze, peering down at the white marble group of Acis and Galatea embracing below (see above). A little later Auguste Rodin made a series of statues, centred on Polyphemus. Originally modelled in clay around 1888 and later cast in bronze, they may have been inspired by Ottin's work.

A final theme is the rage that succeeds the moment of discovery. That is portrayed in earlier paintings of Polyphemus casting a rock at the fleeing lovers, such as those by Annibale Carracci, Lucas Auger and Carle van Loo. Jean-François de Troy's 18th-century version combines discovery with aftermath as the giant perched above the lovers turns to wrench up a rock.

== Artistic depictions of Polyphemus ==
=== Polyphemus and Odysseus ===
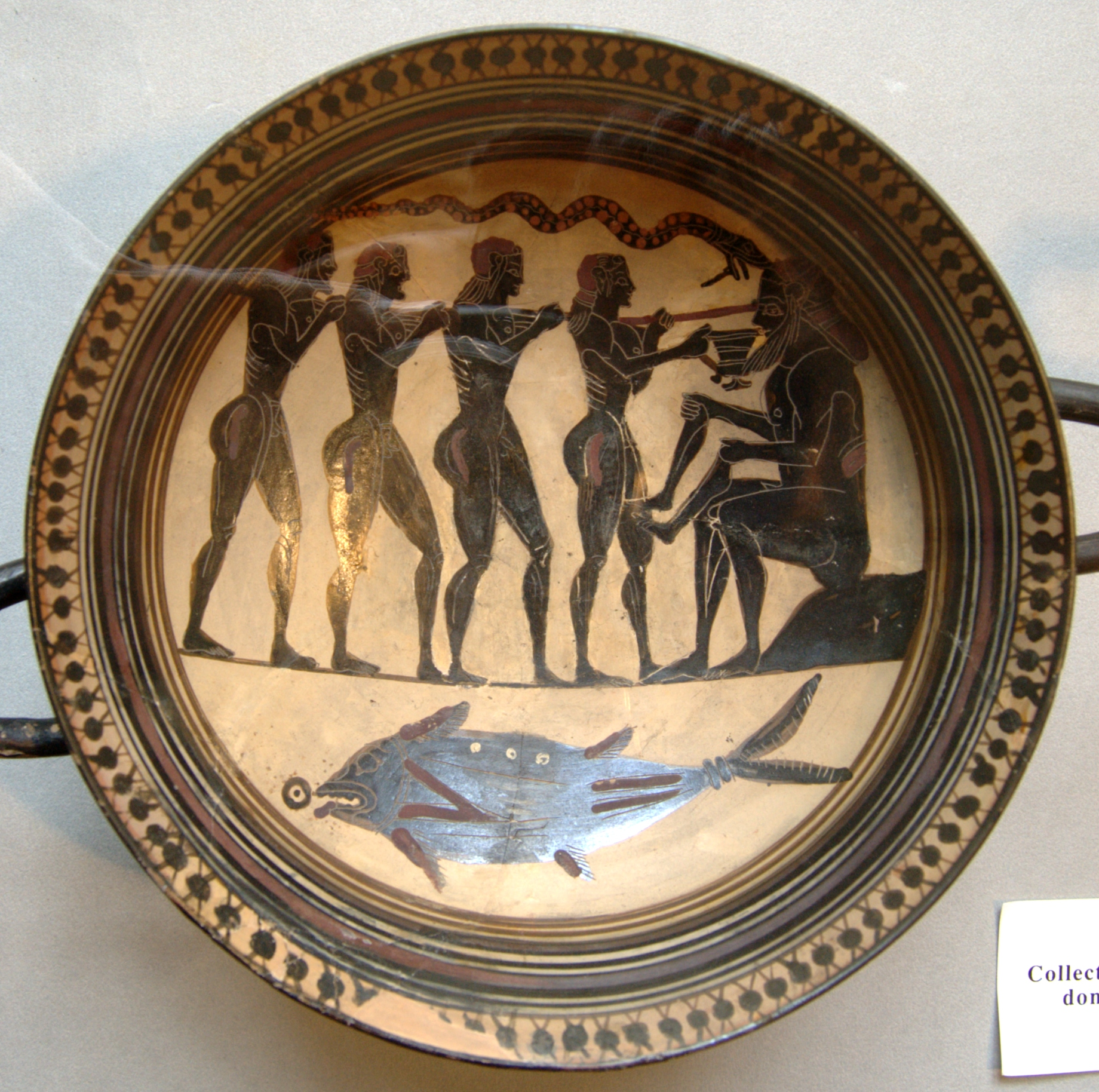
The blinding, Laconian black-figure cup, 565–560 BC

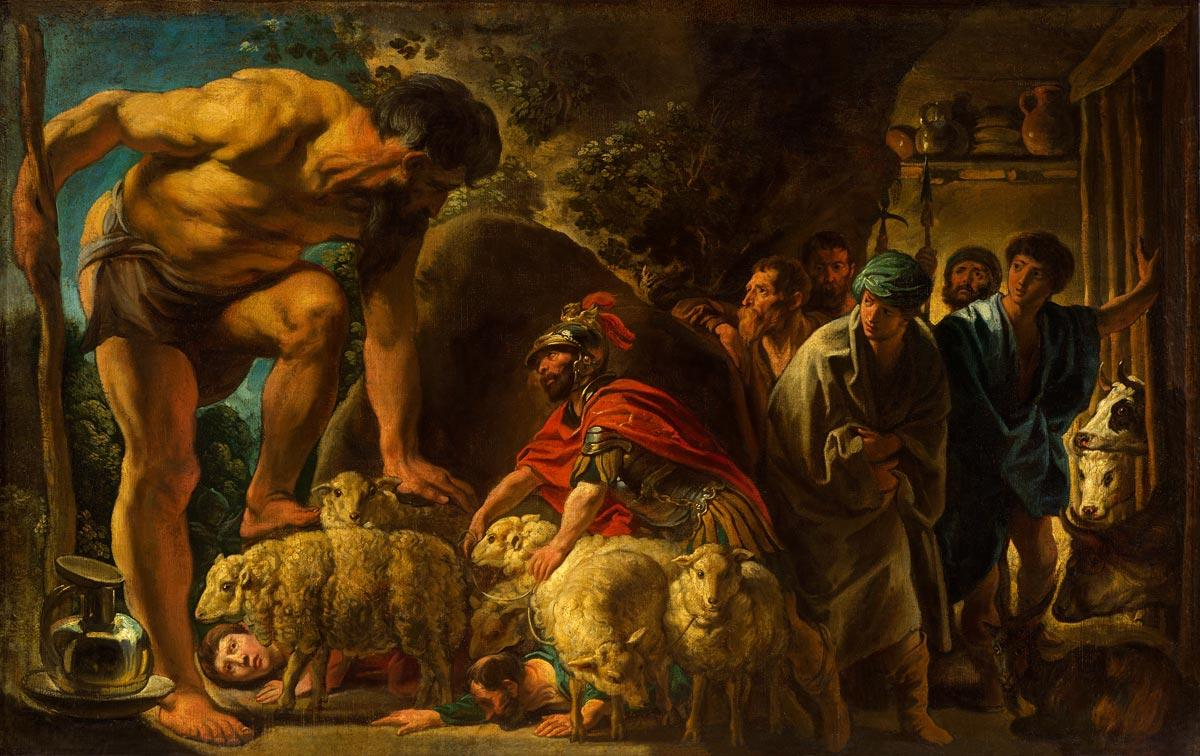
Flemish Jacob Jordaens's depiction of Odysseus escaping from the cave of Polyphemus, 1635.

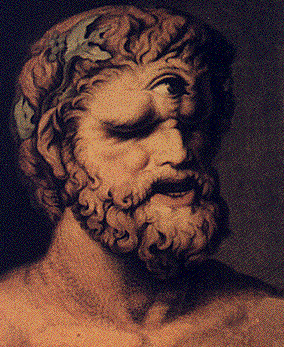
Johann Heinrich Wilhelm Tischbein's 1802 head and shoulders portrait of the giant

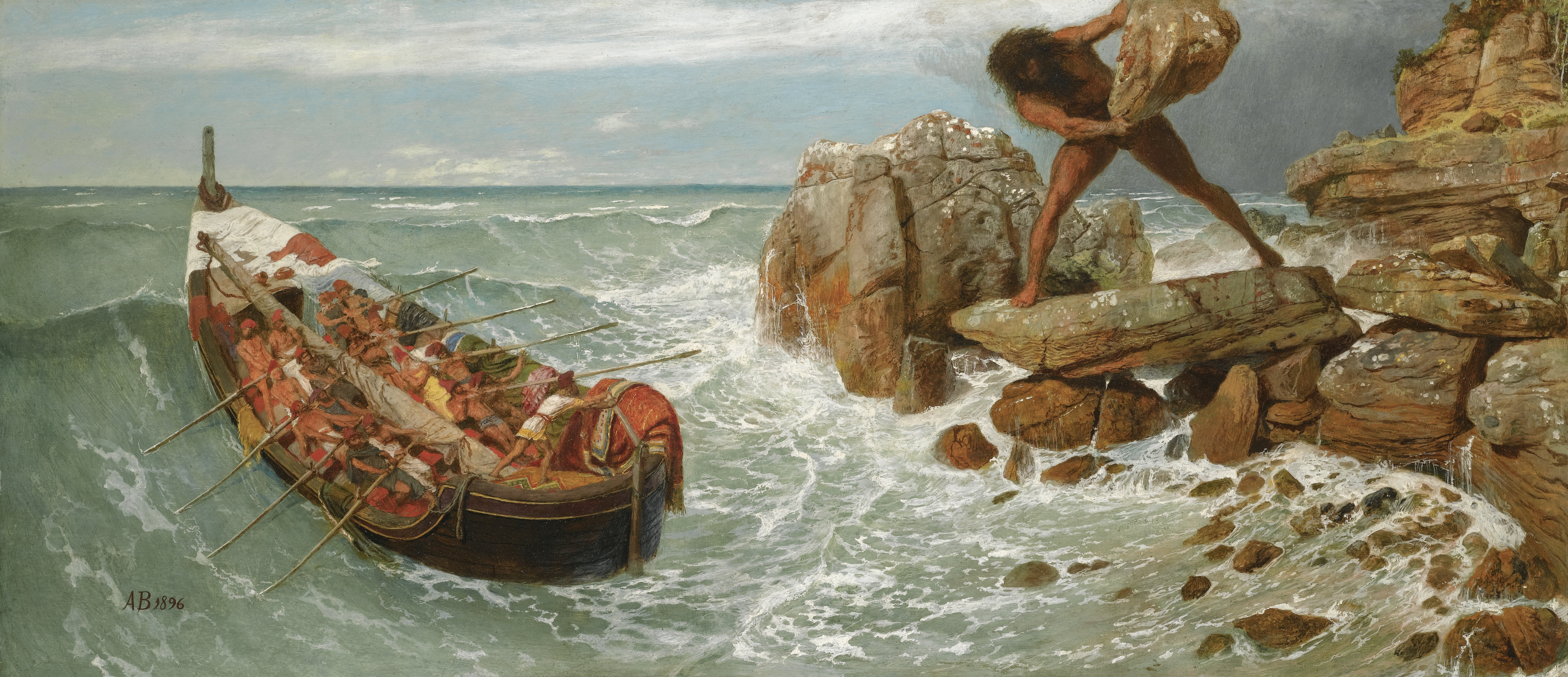
Arnold Böcklin, Polyphemus attempts to crush the boat of the escaping Odysseus,

=== Polyphemus as lover ===
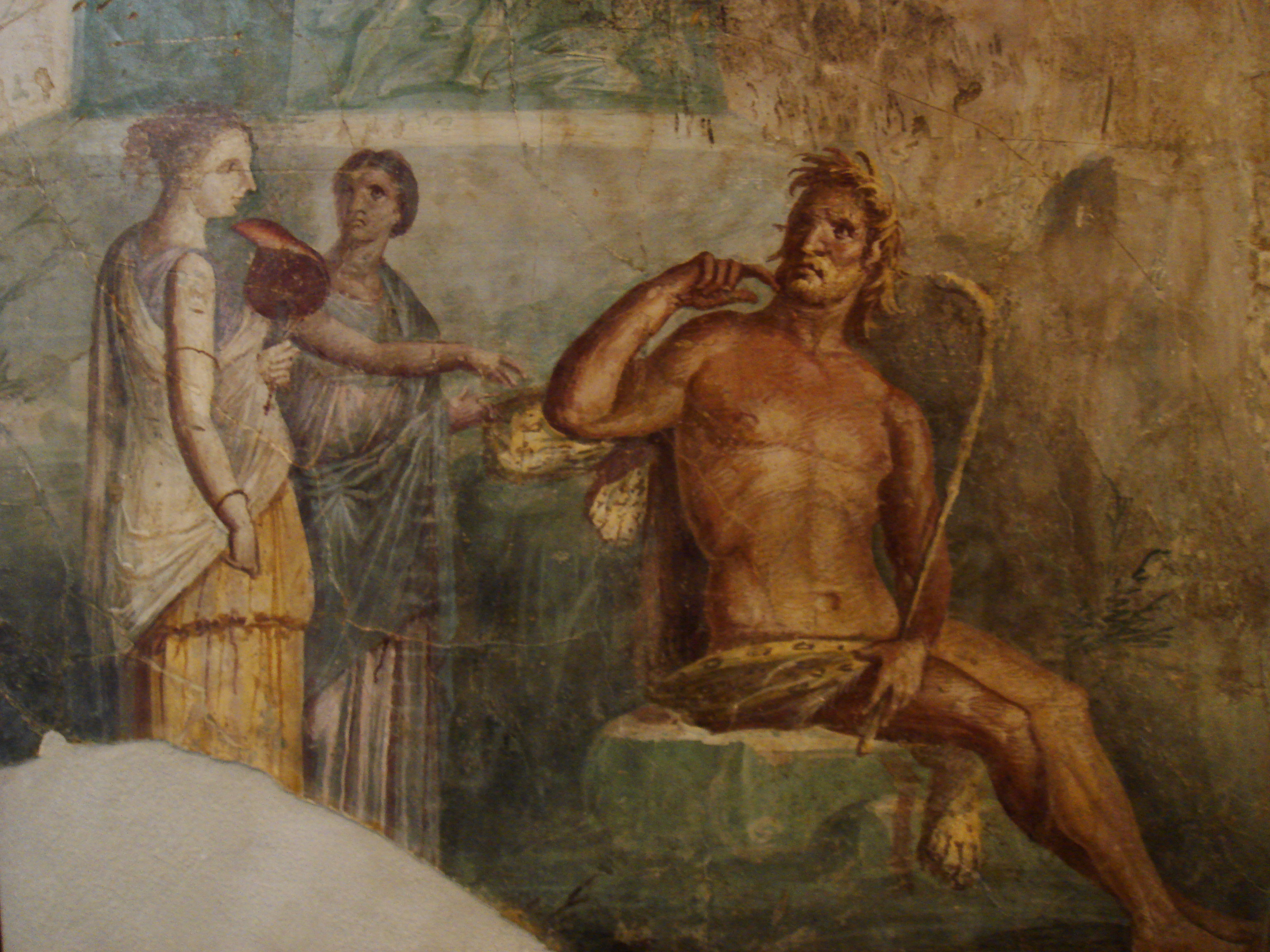
Polyphemus hears of the arrival of Galatea, Fourth Style, 45–79 AD

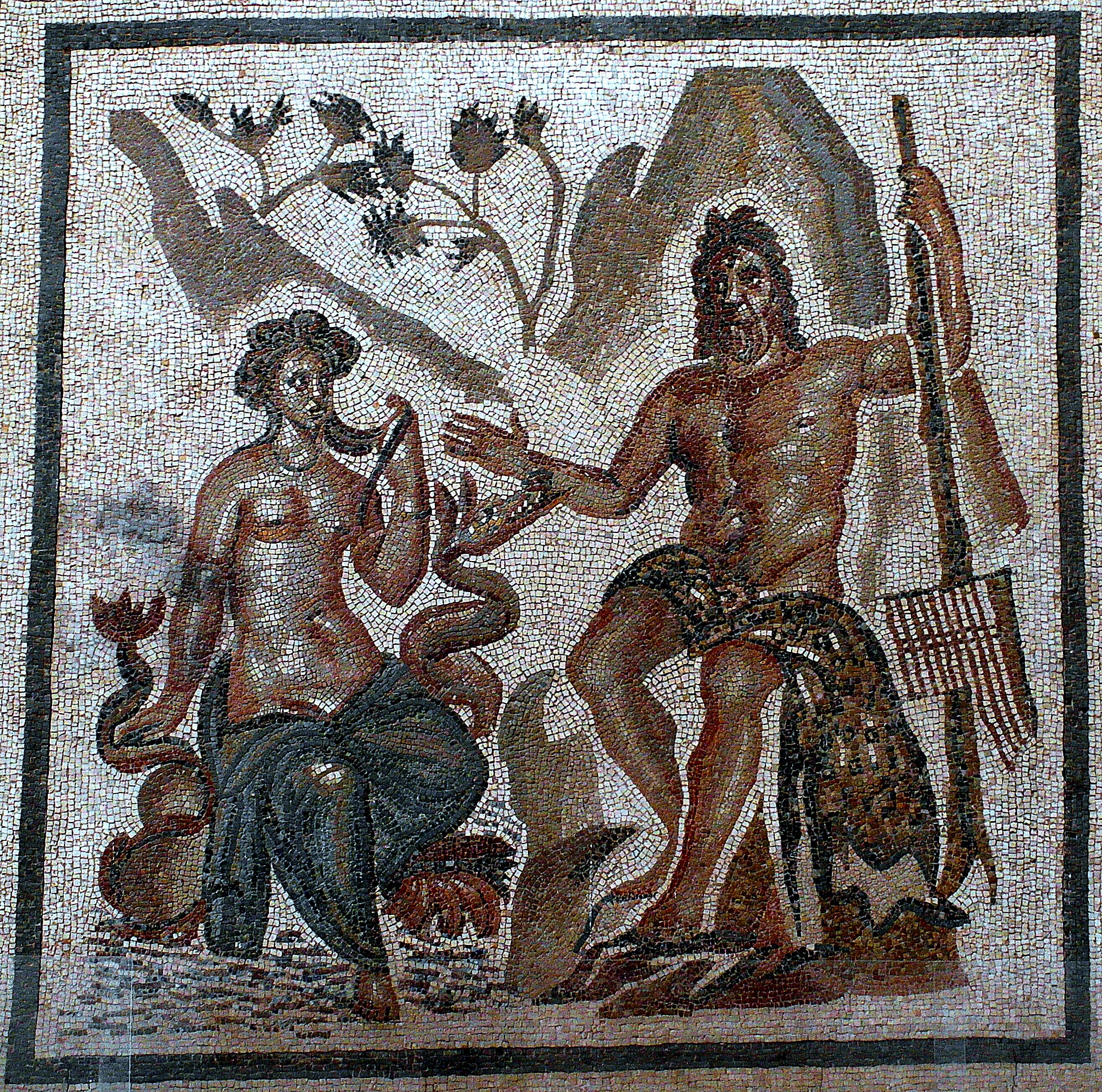
Polyphemus and Galatea, Roman mosaic from the 2nd century AD. Córdoba (Spain).

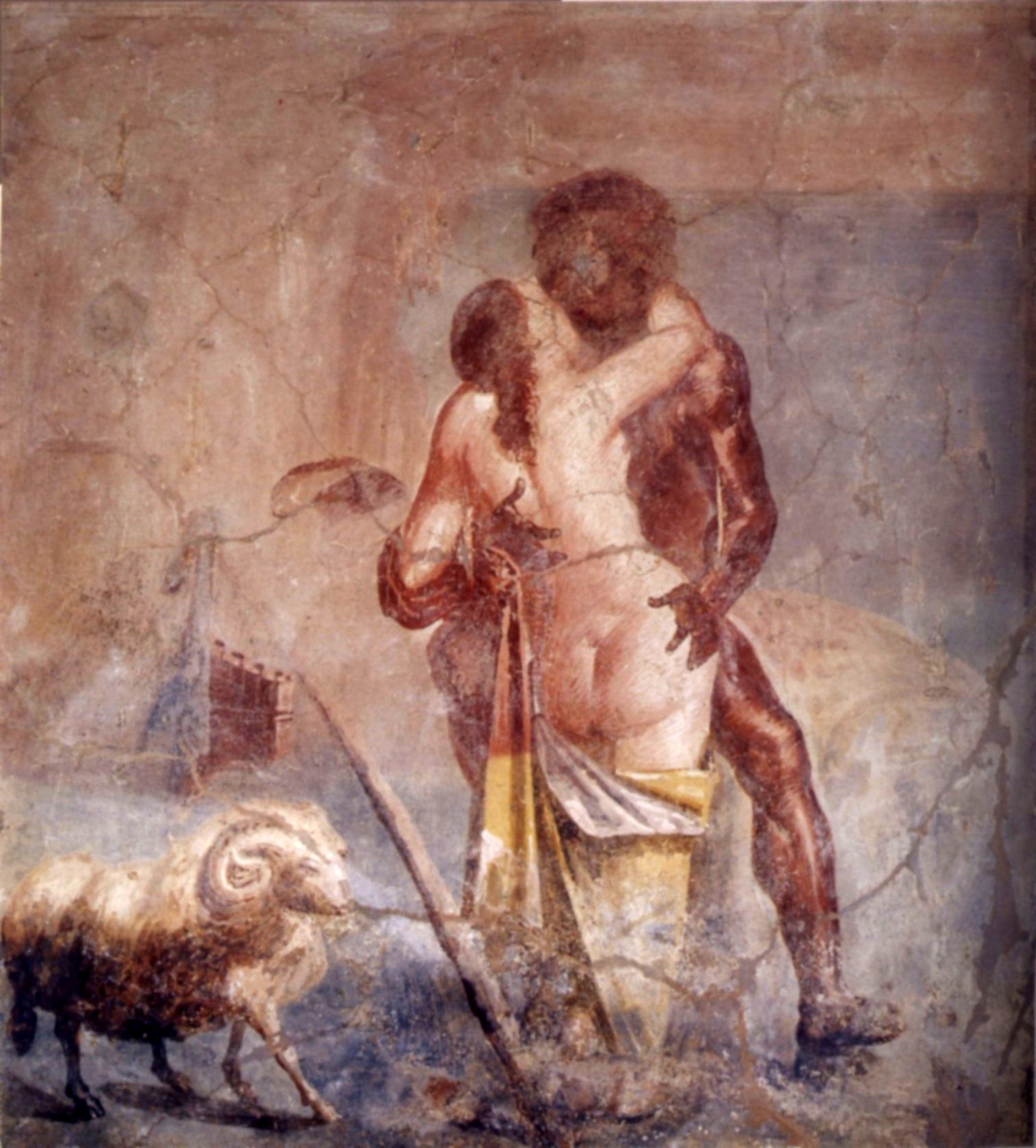
Polyphemus and Galatea in a naked embrace. Fresco. From Pompeii 1st century

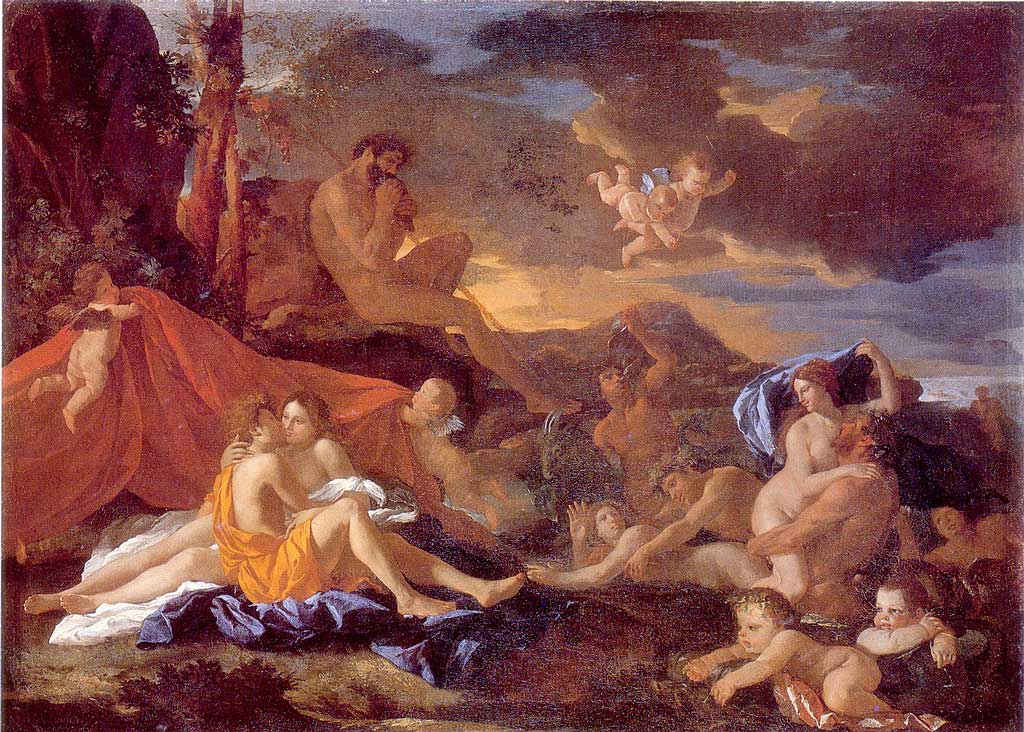
Nicolas Poussin, Acis and Galatea concealed from the flute-playing Polyphemus, 1630.

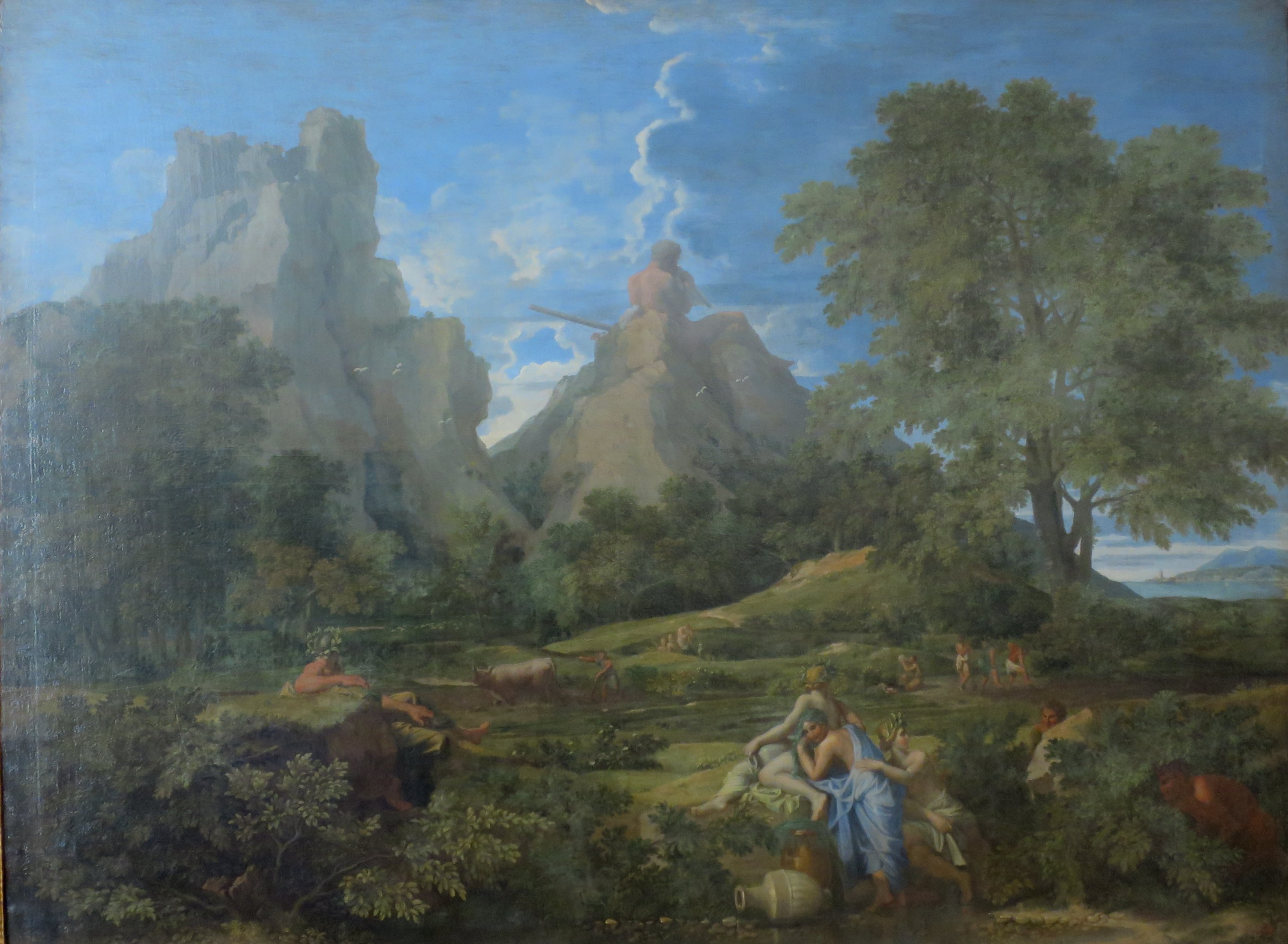
Nicolas Poussin's pastoral "Landscape with Polyphemus", 1649.

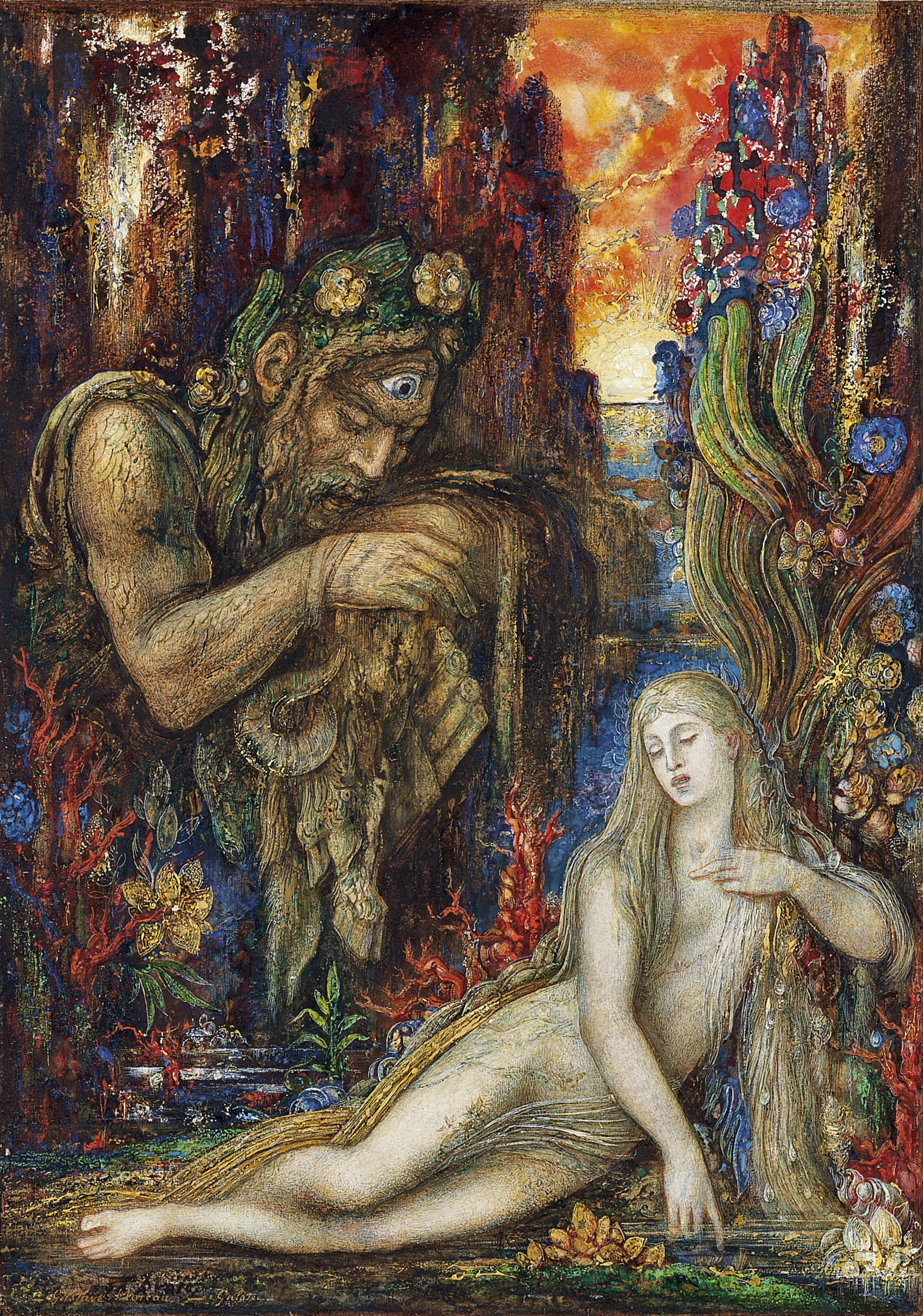
Gustave Moreau, Polyphemus adores the sleeping Galatea, c. 1896

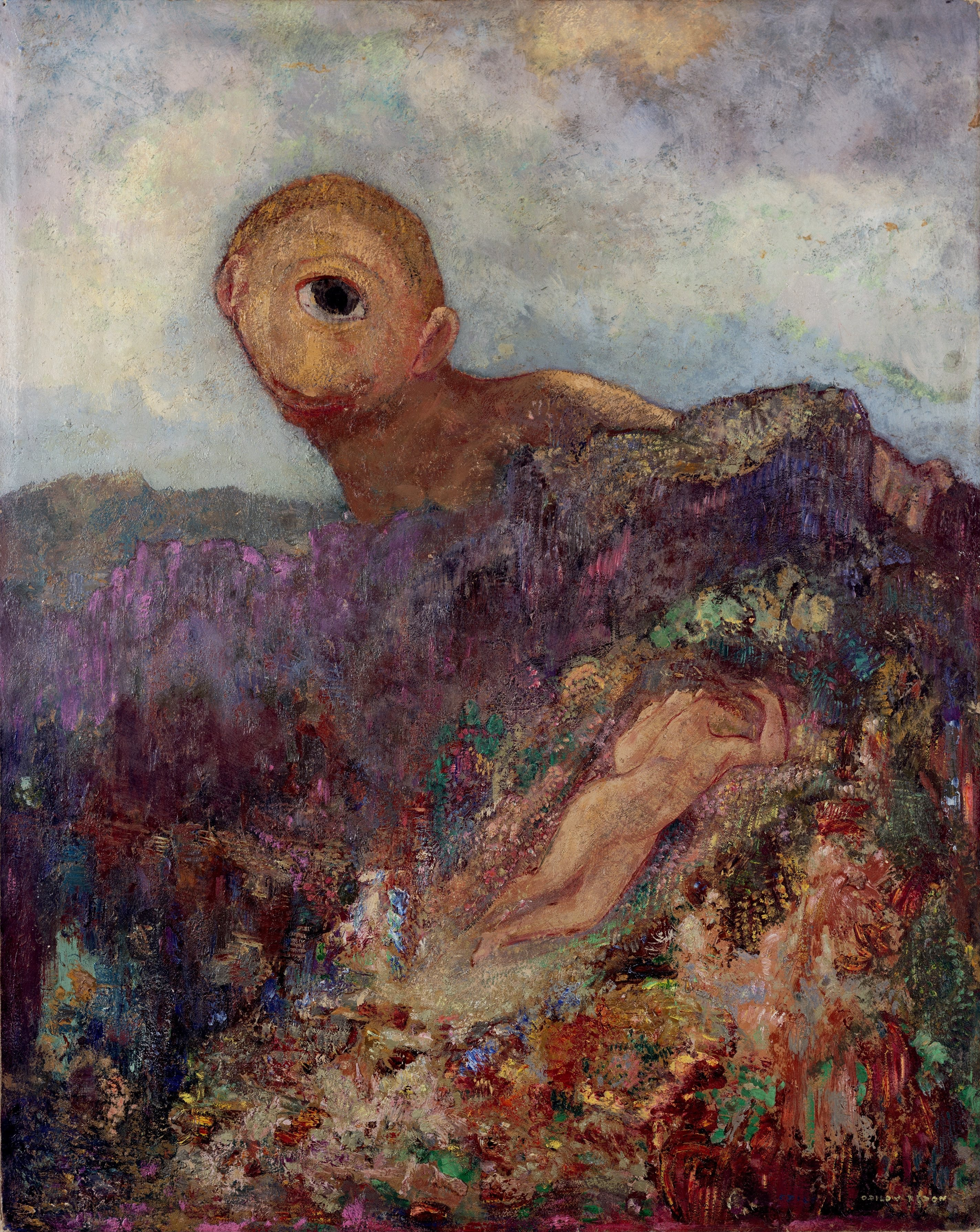
Odilon Redon, The Cyclops 1898–1914

== Other uses ==
Polyphemus is mentioned in the "Apprentice" chapter of Albert Pike's Morals and Dogma (1871), as, within Scottish Rite Freemasonry, Polyphemus is regarded as a symbol for a civilization that harms itself using ill directed blind force.

The Polyphemus moth is so named because of the large eyespots in the middle of the hind wings.

A species of burrowing tortoise, Gopherus polyphemus, is named after Polyphemus because of their both using subterranean retreats.

In folkloristics, the episode of the blinding of Polyphemus is also known as Polyphemsage and classified in the Aarne-Thompson-Uther Index as ATU 1137, "The Ogre Blinded (Polyphemus)".

== See also ==
- Telemus
- Cyclopean Isles
