= Telemos =

Telemos may refer to:

- Telemus, son of Eurymus in Greek mythology;
- The BAE/Dassault Telemos unmanned aircraft.
- Telemos, a character in Aion: The Tower of Eternity
- Telemos International Group, a business in the Netherlands.
