= Archaeological Museum of Patras =

Νέο Αρχαιολογικό Μουσείο Πάτρας New Archaeological Museum of Patras

- Location within Patras
- Established: 2006
- Location: Amerikis Street and Patras-Athens National Road, Patras, Greece
- Coordinates: 38.2636°N 21.7523°E
- Type: Archaeological Museum
- Director: Geologist Nikolaos Mourtzas
- Website: www.ampatron.gr

The New Archaeological Museum of Patras is a museum located in the city of Patras, Greece.

== Description ==
The museum opened on July 24, 2009. The construction plans for the museum were initially announced by the then Minister of Culture, Melina Mercouri. However, the construction plans did not materialise until 2004.

Built on a 28,000-square-metre (300,000 sq ft) plot of land, with 8,000 square metres of interior spaces, it is the second-largest museum of Greece. The area surrounding the museum comprises a 500-square-metre (5,400 sq ft) pool, a shiny metallic dome and greenery. In the near future, the vacant land next to the museum will be turned into a cultural park.

It houses collections about the history of Patras and the surrounding area from prehistory to the end of Roman times. The museum was designed by Bobotis+Bobotis Architects with an original cost of 21.5 million euros that ended up at a total of 25 million. It was originally planned to open in 2006, when Patras was the cultural capital of Europe, but despite the construction being ready, the structure remained empty, with the opening being delayed several times.

The museum has four thematic sections, three of which are permanent and one is periodic. The periodic section will be hosting various exhibitions around the year. According to the archaeologists of the 6th Antiquity Conservancy, the 70% of the items exhibited are seeing the light of day for the first time in the past thirty years. The museum is open Tuesdays - Sundays, from 8 a.m. till 8 p.m. during Summer Season (April - October), and from 8 a.m. until 3 p.m. during Winter Season (November - March). The entrance fee for adults is currently 4 euro (August 2011).

== Thematic Sections ==
In all sections of the museum, there are projectors showing optical informative material, depending on the items exhibited.

=== Private life ===
The first and bigger section, exhibits items of everyday life, working tools, cosmetics and jewellery from Mycenaean, Ancient, Hellenistic and Roman Greece, with the oldest being of 17th century BC. Apart from these items, this section includes partly reconstructed Roman residences, in natural size by the original materials. In the same place, there is also a part of one of the biggest mosaic collections in Greece, consisting of 14 Roman mosaics covering a total of 250 square metres, vast majority of which are vertically placed. Most of these mosaics were discovered in ruins of luxurious urban residences in the city of Patras.

=== Public life ===
The section of the Public Life covers the period from 1500 B.C. until the 4th century A.D. There are maps of the Roman territory that frame the information material for the monumental topography of the city. There are exhibits from the Roman period, mainly related to commercial activities, social and administrative organization, cults and entertainment of the inhabitants.

=== Necropolis ===
The section of necropolis is dedicated to tombs and items discovered in Patras and the greater region of Achaia. It presents the burial architecture and its evolution from the prehistoric till the Roman times, not only by the items found but with the reconstruction of various types of tombs. In fact there are three totally reconstructed tombs, two Mycenaean and one Roman at their natural sizes with the skeletons and their gems. In the same place there's also information about the burial customs and beliefs, and the burning of the dead in Ancient Greece.

=== Periodic Section ===
In the periodic section of the museum, various exhibitions will be taking place around the year. The first exhibition, which lasts till the end of November, is dedicated to "Plants and their Culture in Europe" from the ancient world till today. Future plans include a sketch gallery and a lectures schedule.

== See also ==
- Acropolis Museum
- Archaeological Museum of Argos
- Archaeological Museum of Corfu
- Archaeological Museum of Olympia
- List of museums in Greece
