= Polyphemos reclining and holding a drinking bowl =

5th-4th century BCE Greek figurine

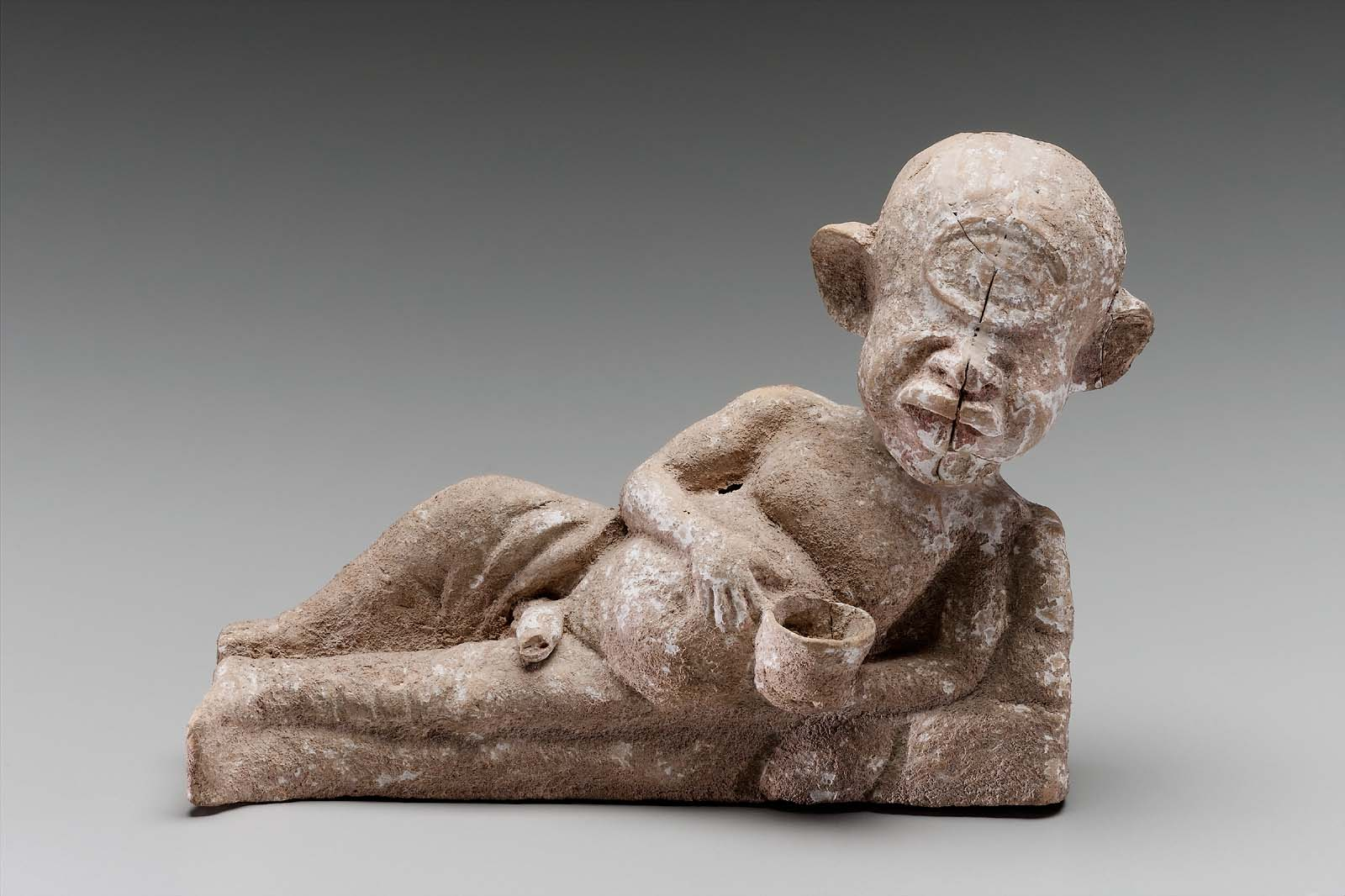
Polyphemos reclining and holding a drinking bowl. Late 5th to early 4th century BCE, Boeotia, Greece. Museum of Fine Arts, Boston.

Polyphemos reclining and holding a drinking bowl is a Late Classical terracotta figurine that was created in Boeotia, Greece in late 5th- early 4th century BCE. The Museum of Fine Arts, Boston purchased the statue in December 1901 from E.P. Warren, who bought the terracotta figure in Paris in 1901, from a vendor who acquired it in Thebes.

== Depiction of Polyphemos ==
The terracotta figurine depicts Polyphemos, the Cyclops and antagonist of Odysseus in book nine of Homer’s Odyssey, as a dignified banqueter consuming wine. This figurine depicts the scene in the Odyssey where, in order to escape death, Odysseus tricks Polyphemos to become highly intoxicated.

== Archaeological discovery ==
The figurine was discovered in the Kabirion sanctuary, which is situated near Thebes. Every year, the sanctuary held a festival where performers parodied popular myths. Polyphemos reclining and holding a drinking bowl reflects the presence and importance of humor in ancient Greek culture.

== Satirical intent ==
The figurine is a satirical image of the Cyclops by likening his act of binging on wine to an elite drinking wine while attending a symposium. It was common to mock Polyphemos within Greek art and literature, which is reflected by Euripides’ satirical play Cyclops.

Additionally, this terracotta figurine displays the traditional artistic portrayal of Cyclops during the Classical period. These characteristics include a pot belly, large ears, a large eye in the middle of the forehead, a bulbous nose, puffy lips, and fat cheeks.
