= The Cyclops (Redon) =

Painting by Odilon Redon

- Le Cyclope (French)
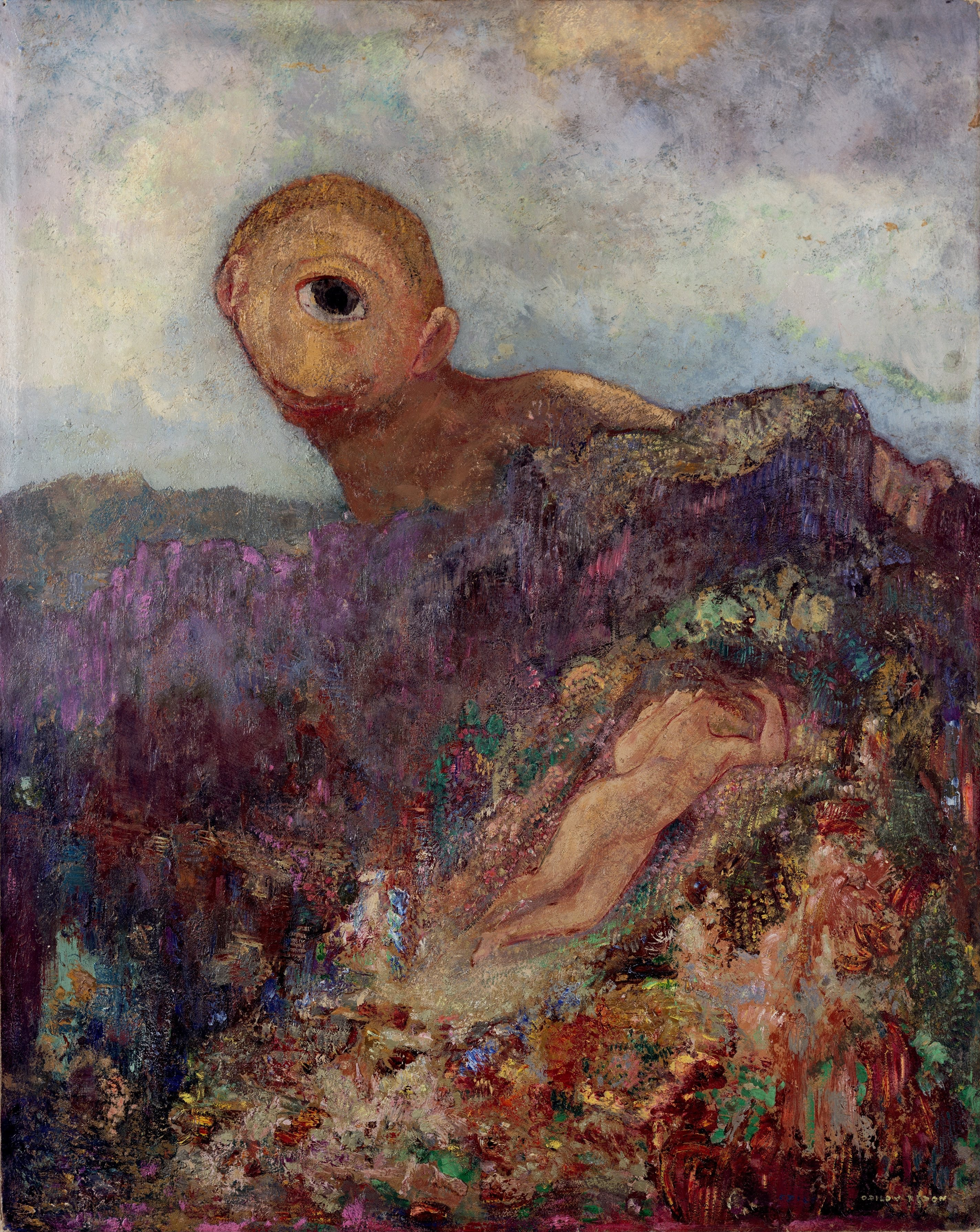
- Artist: Odilon Redon
- Year: c. 1914
- Medium: Oil on cardboard on panel
- Movement: Post-Impressionism
- Subject: Myth of Polyphemus
- Location: Kröller-Müller Museum, Otterlo
- Website: https://krollermuller.nl/en/odilon-redon-the-cyclops-1

The Cyclops (French: Le Cyclope) is a symbolist painting by Odilon Redon that depicts the myth of the love of Polyphemus for the nymph Galatea. It was painted in oil on cardboard, then mounted on wood, and is now in the Kröller-Müller Museum in the Netherlands. The painting has been variously dated between 1898 and 1914.

== Description ==
Galatea is shown asleep on the lower right, her naked body blending into the flowery hill slope. In the upper half of the painting, the head and shoulders of the cyclops Polyphemus tower above a mountain ridge as he turns his one eye in the naiad's direction.

It appears Polyphemus has hidden himself from the nymph behind the rocky terrain, too shy to directly confront her "helpless" form. Although the name given to the painting refers to the figure of classical myth, the subject may also carry overtones of the one-eyed giants that populate the folklore of the Aquitaine region where Redon grew up.
