= Telemus =

Prophet among the cyclopes in Greek mythology

Telemus (Ancient Greek: Τήλεμος, romanized: Telemos) was a figure of Greek mythology, a prophet, son of Eurymus or of Proteus and Psamathe. Telemus warned the Cyclops Polyphemus that he would lose his sight to a man named Odysseus.

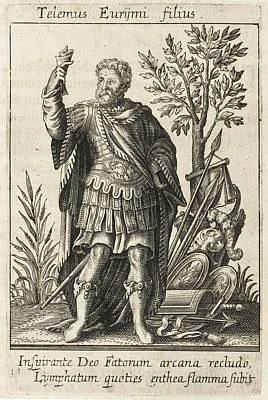
Telemus as depicted by Pierre Mussard

'Alas!
Now an ancient prophecy about me
has truly been fulfilled! Telemus,
fine, tall son of Eurymus, a seer
who surpassed all men in prophecy,
reached old age among the Cyclopes
as a soothsayer. He said all these things
would come to pass someday—I'd lose my sight
at the hand of someone called Odysseus.

— Homer, Odyssey, ix, 509; translated by Ian C. Johnston
