= Archaeological Museum of Argos =

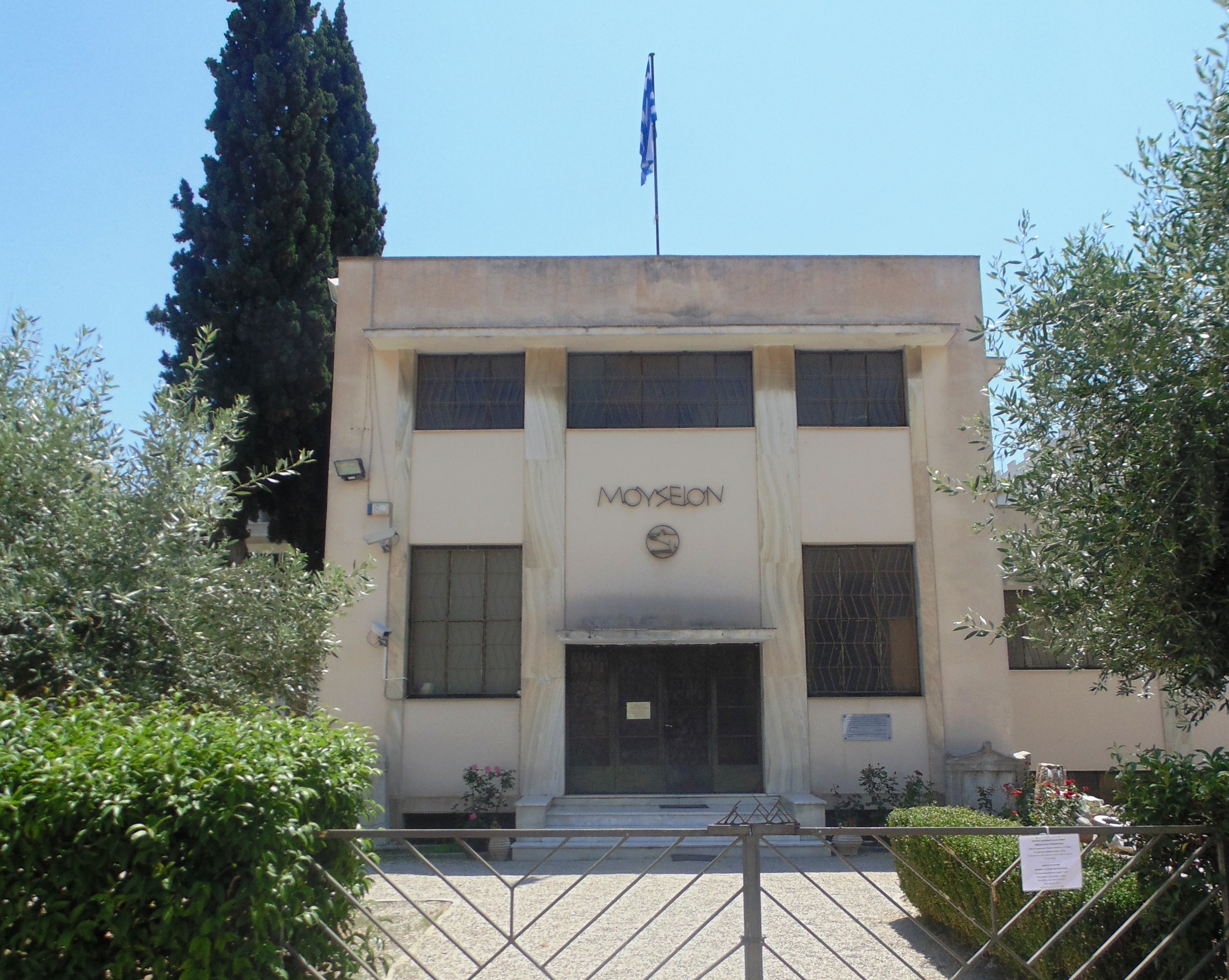
- View of the front entrance of the museum
- Established: 1957
- Location: Argos, Argolis, Peloponnese, Greece
- Coordinates: 37.634642°N 22.726580°E
- Type: Archaeological museum

The Archaeological Museum of Argos (Greek: Αρχαιολογικό Μουσείο Άργους) is a museum in Argos, in Argolis on the Peloponnese peninsula, Greece. The history of the museum began in April 1932, when the heirs of J. Kallergis donated the building to the Argos city council. They in turn gave it to the Greek state along with the surrounding area on October 25, 1955.

The museum consists of two sections; the Kallergeio museum which was inaugurated in 1957 and the new section in 1961. The French Archaeological School, who also oversaw the building of the new section, are responsible for many of the items displayed in the museum which were unearthed in Argos and the prefecture and date from the Mid-Helladic period (about 2000 B.C.) until Late Antiquity (600 AD). The bulk of the artifacts were discovered at the ancient agora, in the area of the ancient Roman theatre and also at the Mycenaean grave in Deras. The American School of Classical Studies were also responsible for some excavations represented in the collection, particularly those at Lerna.

== Collections ==
Items of note in the Argos Archaeological Museum include a Minoan style bridge-mouthed pot of sub-Mycenaean times, a reddish pot (460–450 BC) representing the fight of Theseus and the Minotaur, attended by Ariadne, a compass of the early geometric times, which is decorated with meanders and parallel lines, and a mosaic floor excavated from a house of the 5th century, in which symbols represent the twelve months.

The museum also has many sculptures, including the Roman Heracles, which is a copy of the prototype by Lysippus for the market of Sikyon. On the downstairs floor of the museum the "Lerna Room" is dedicated to the archaeological discoveries at Lerna. Of particular interest is a miniature clay figurine of a woman or goddess, which is one of the oldest sculptural representations of the human body found in Europe to date. The museum also contains post-Geometric earthenware pomegranate models, both wheel-thrown and hand-made, which evoked the presence of Hera and indicated wealth and prosperity. There is also a bronze cuirass and helmet from a tomb, dating back to the late 8th century BC.

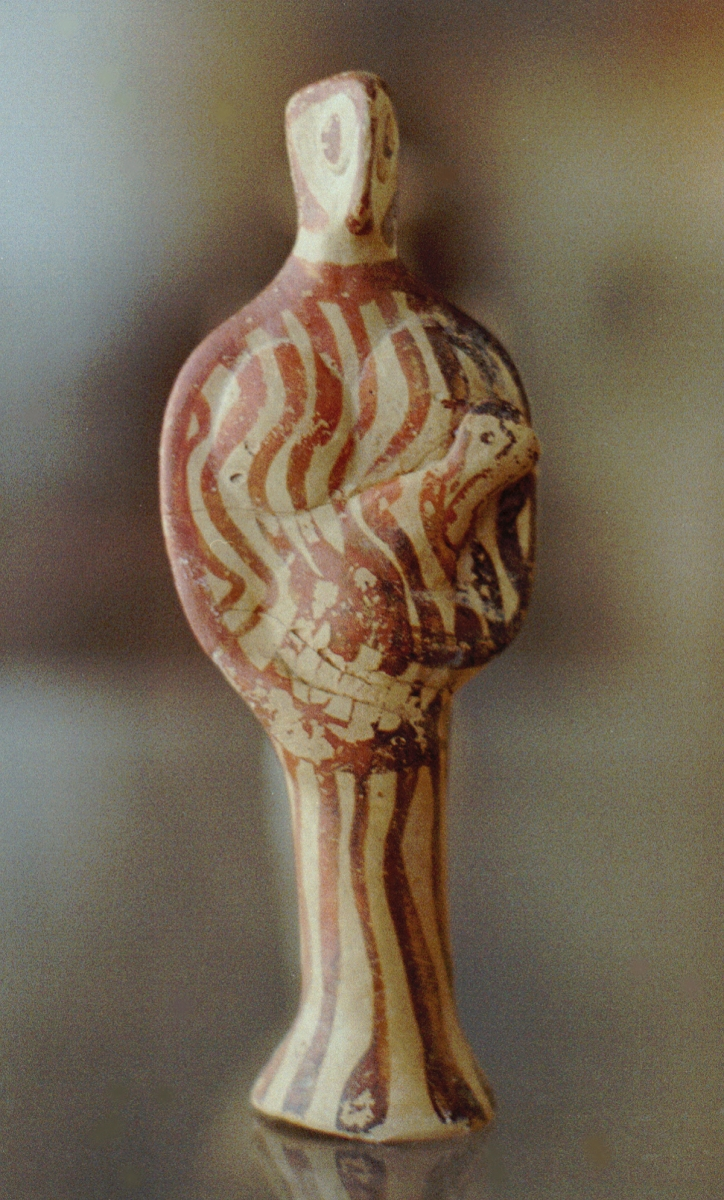

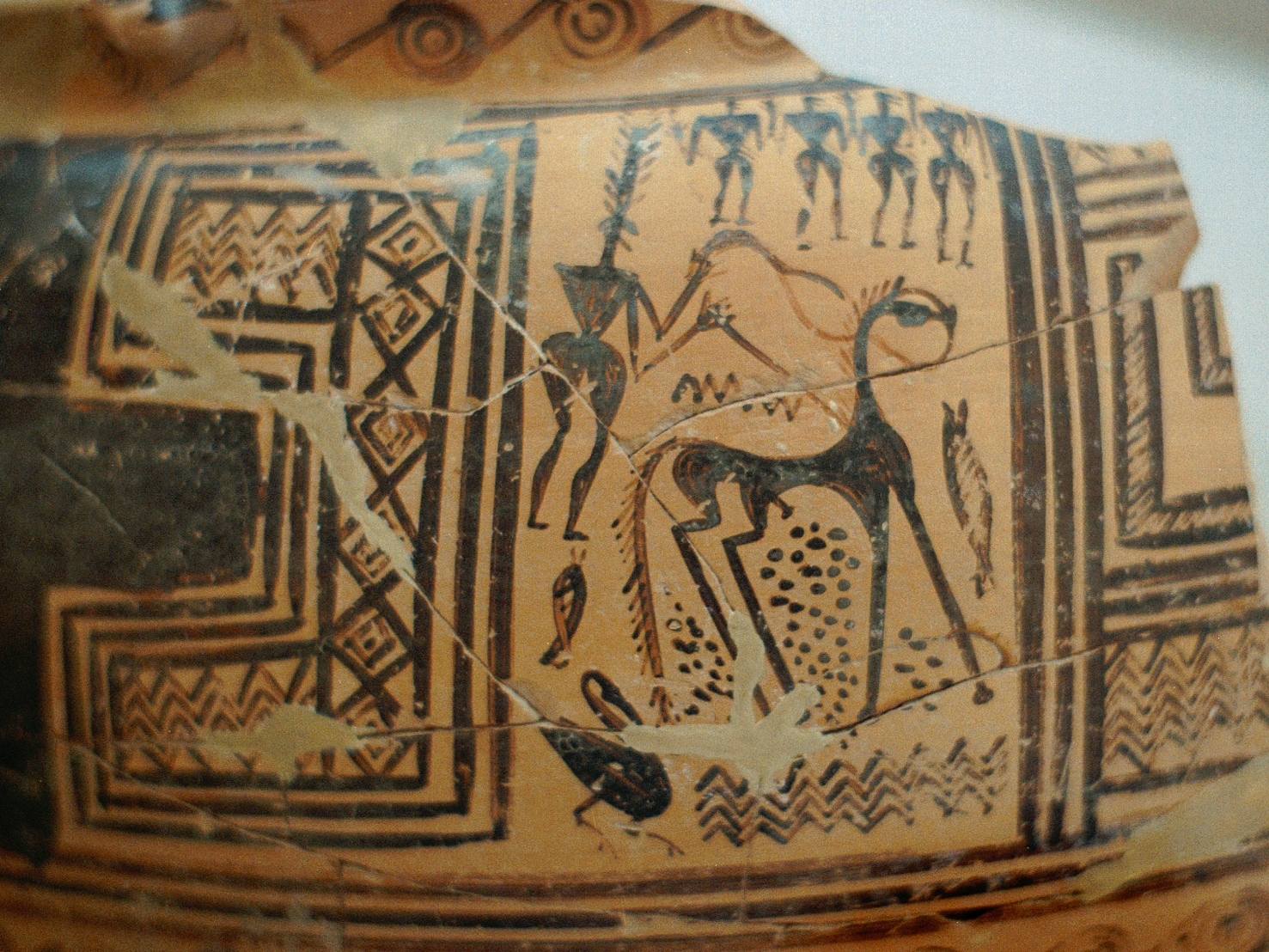

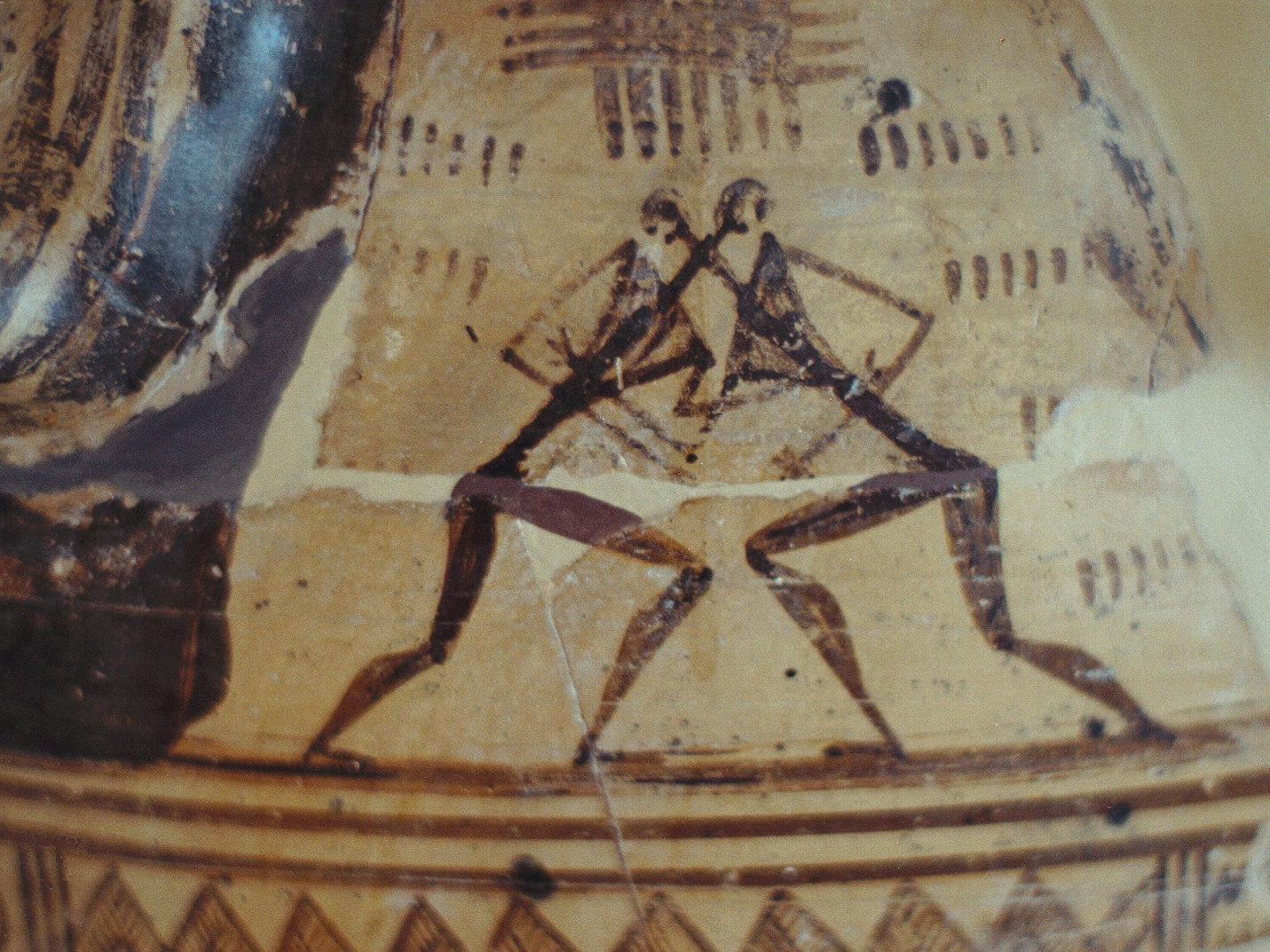

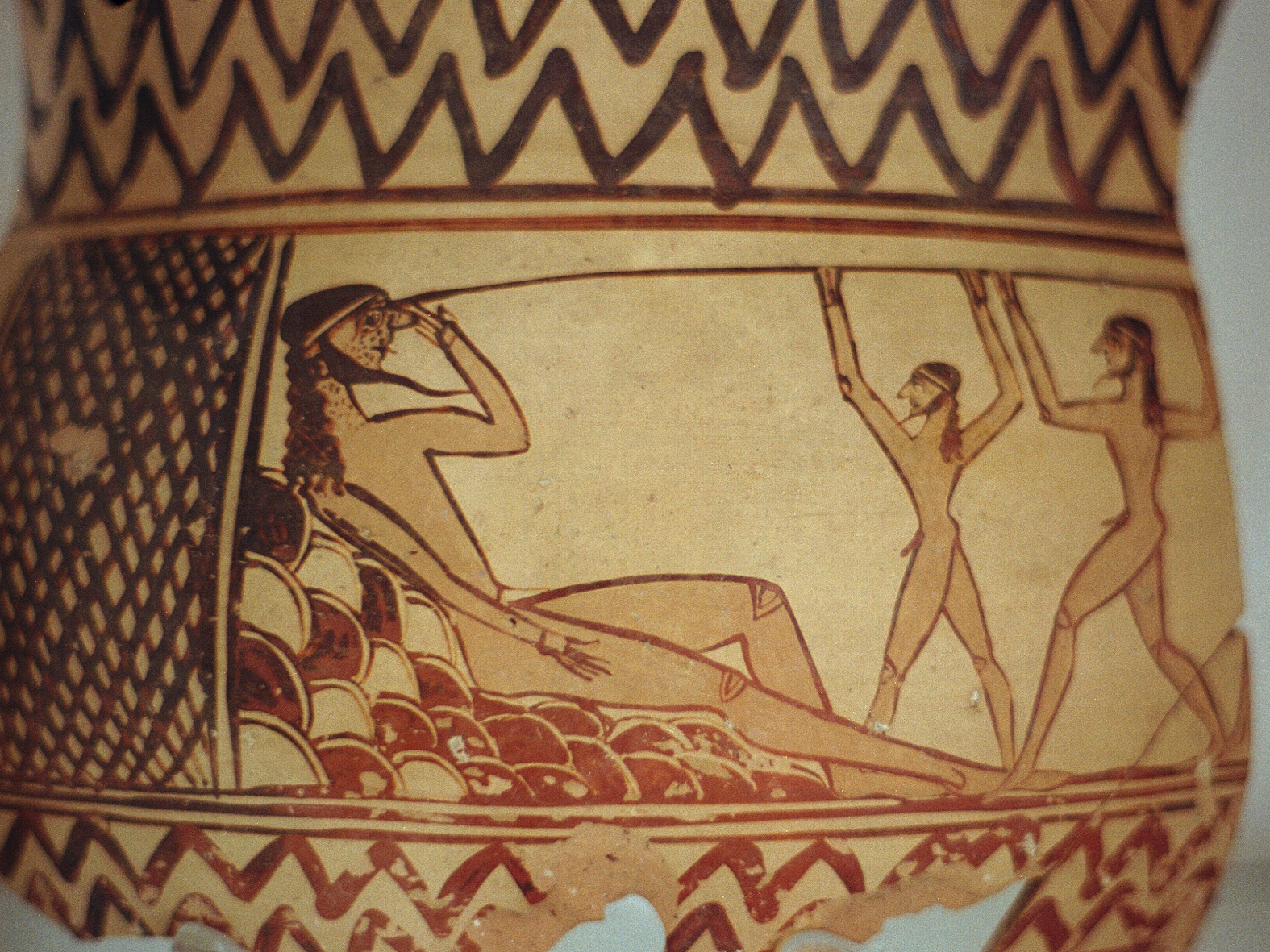

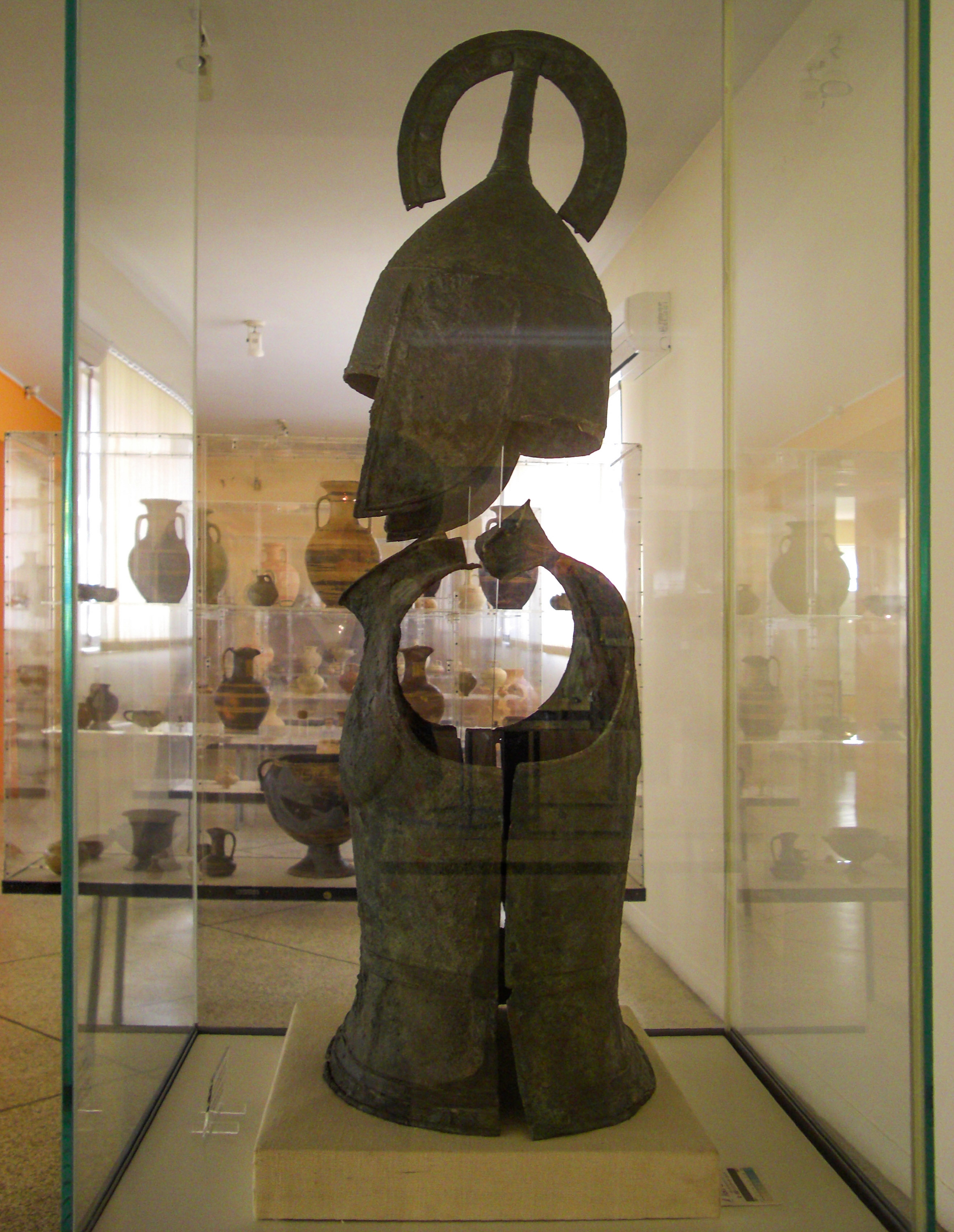

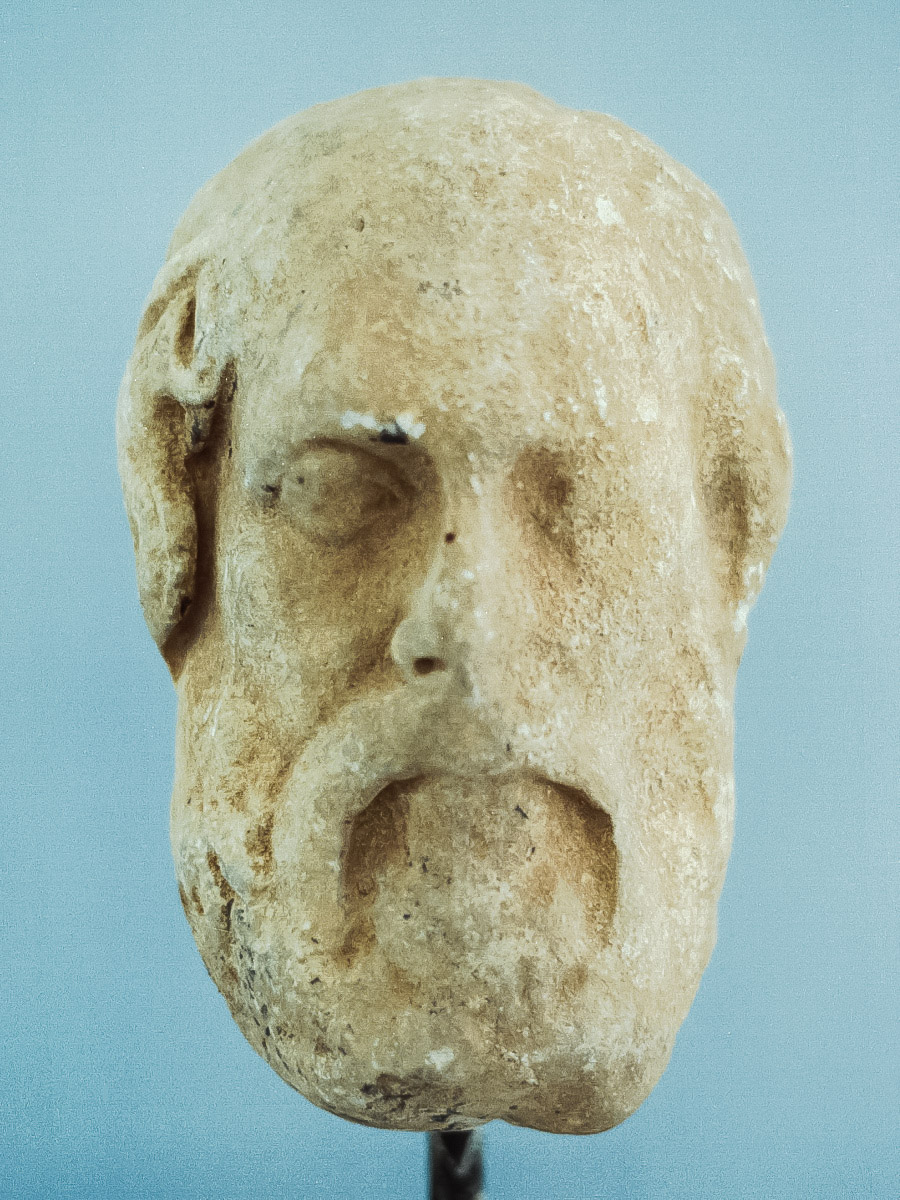

== Exterior ==
In the museum's courtyard are a number of notable Roman mosaics depicting Dionysos and the seasons. During the winter months the figures in the mosaics are wrapped in cloaks and thick leggings but during the summer they are dressed down in light tunics and leggings.
