= List of Illyrian peoples and tribes =

Overview of the Illyrian tribes

The Illyrians (Ancient Greek: Ἰλλυριοί, Illyrioi; Latin: Illyrii) were a conglomeration of Indo-European peoples and tribes in the Balkan Peninsula, Southeastern Europe.

== Illyrian tribes ==
Tribe	Description
Abroi	
Albanoi	The Albanoi populated the region between the Mat and Shkumbin. Their chief settlement was Albanopolis located in Zgërdhesh, near Krujë.
Amantes	Also referred to as the Amantieis or Amantini, the Amantes lived in the inland region of the Bay of Vlorë.
Ardiaei	The Ardiaei lived in a region between Konjic on the north, the Neretva on the west, Lake Shkodër to the southeast and the Adriatic Sea on the south. The chief settlements of the Ardiaean State were Rhizon and Scodra.
Armistae	
Arthitae	
Autariatae	The Autariatae, alternatively known as Autariatai or Autariates, inhabited the valleys of Lim, Tara and West Morava within the Accursed Mountains.
Balaites	
Baridustae	
Bathiatae	The Bathiatae were located among today's modern Bosna River which was once known as Bathinus flumen and they took their name from this river.
Bylliones	
Cavii	The Cavii lived close to Lake Shkodër. Their main settlement was Epicaria, which is thought to be probably located around modern-day Pukë.
Dalmatae	The Dalmatae lived in the region of Dalmatia.
Daorsi	The Daorsi lived in the valley of Neretva.
Dardani	The Dardani lived in the Kosovo and areas around it.
Dassareti	
Daunians	
Deraemestae	
Deretini	
Deuri	
Dindari	The Dindari were of Celtic influence and lived on the western bank of the Drina Valley, close to Skelani and Srebrenica.
Docleatae	
Dyestes	
Enchele	
Endirudini	
Grabaei	
Iapydes	
Kinambroi	
Labeatae	
Mazaei	
Melcumani	
Messapians	
Narensi	
Ozuaei	
Parthini	
Penestae	
Peucetians	
Pleraei	
Sardiatae	
Sasaei	
Selepitani	
Tariotes	
Taulantii	The Taulantii or Taulantians were are among the most archaic attested Illyrian peoples. They inhabited the region across the hinterland of Dyrrhachion-Epidamnos between the valleys of Mat and Shkumbin.

== Possibly related peoples ==
Map of the Illyrian tribes

- Antitani / Atintanes / Atintani? (Illyrian Atintani)
- Dassaretae
- Turboletae

=== Pannonians ===
==== Eastern group ====
  - Amantini / Amantes
  - Andes / Andizetes
  - Azali
  - Breuci
    - Colapiani
    - Oseriates / Osseriates
  - Ditiones
  - Jasi
  - Pirustae / Pirusti
  - Ceraunii
  - Glintidiones
  - Scirtari
  - Siculotae

==== Western group ====
  - Daesitiates
  - Maezaei / Maizaioi / Mazaioi
  - Segestani

=== Paeonians ===
Paionian tribes in yellow, north and northeast of Ancient Macedonians

There are different views and still no agreement among scholars about the Paeonians/Paeones ethnic and linguistic kinship. Some such as Wilhelm Tomaschek and Paul Kretschmer claim that the language spoken by the Paeonians belonged to the Illyrian family, while Dimitar Dechev claims affinities with Thracian. Irwin L. Merker considers that the language spoken by the Paeonians was closely related to Greek (if it was a distinct language and not a dialect of ancient Greek), a Hellenic language with "a great deal of Illyrian and Thracian influence as a result of this proximity".

- Agrianes (also, Agriani and Agrii) (it is also claimed that this tribe was Thracian)
- Almopians (also Almopioi)
- Derrones (also Derroni) (it is also claimed that this tribe was Thracian)
- Doberes
- Laeaeans (also Laeaei and Laiai)
- Odomantes (also Odomanti) (it is also claimed that this tribe was Thracian)
- Paeoplae
- Siropaiones

== See also ==
- List of Illyrians
- List of settlements in Illyria
- List of ancient tribes in Illyria

== Sources ==
- Mallory, James P.; Adams, D. Q. (1997). Encyclopedia of Indo-European Culture. Routledge. ISBN 1884964982 ISBN 978-1884964985
- Wilkes, John. (1996). The Illyrians. Wiley-Blackwell. ISBN 0631198075 ISBN 978-0631198079
