= Octavian's military campaigns in Illyricum =

Fourth war between the Romans and Illyrians (35-33 B.C.)

- Part of Wars of Octavian
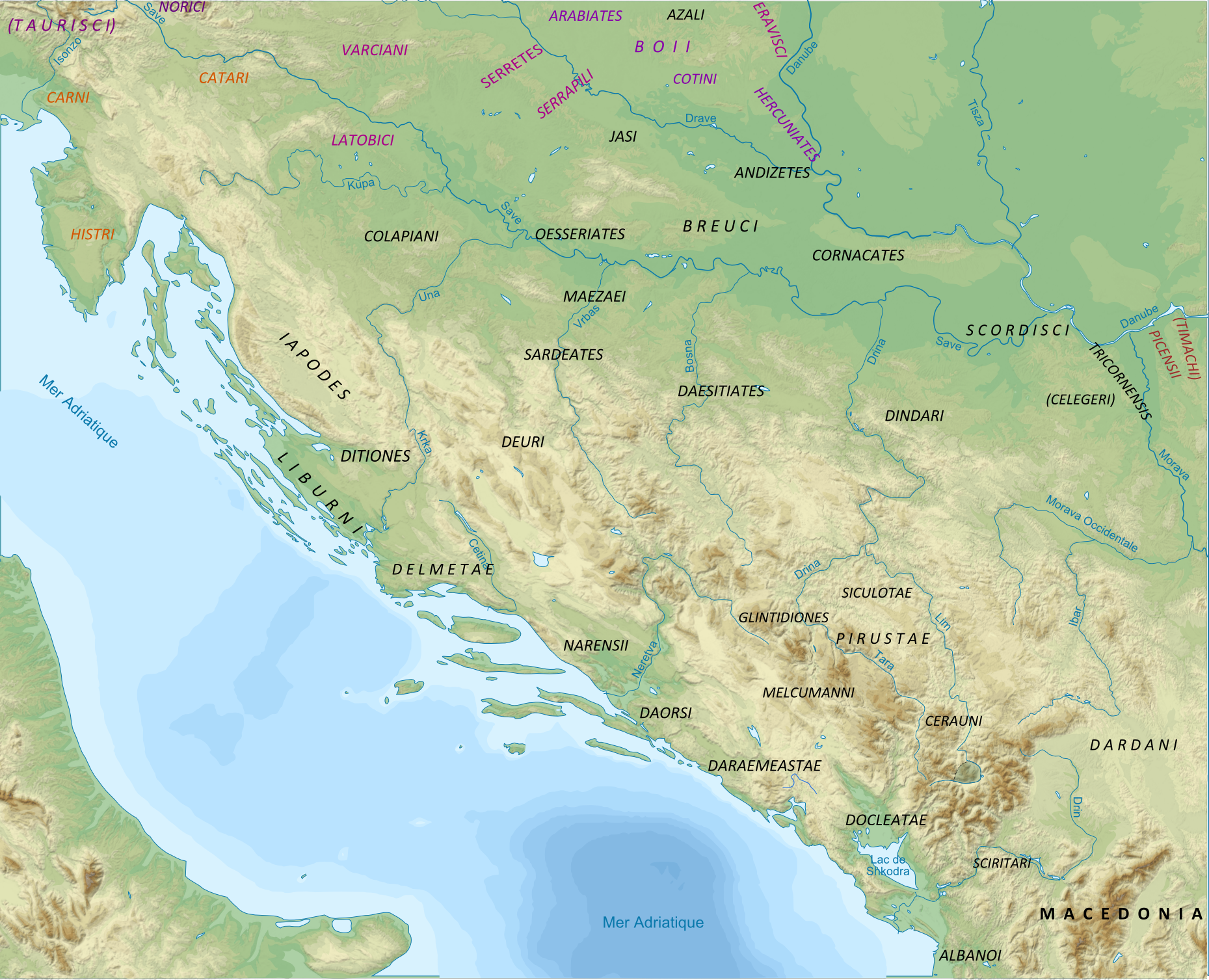
- The area covered by the military campaigns of Octavian
Date	From 35 B.C. to 33 B.C.
Location	Illyria
Result	Roman victory

Belligerents
Romans; Allies: Taurisci, Norici	Iapodes (Moentini, Avendeatae, Arupini); Pannonians (Segestans); Dalmatae; Daesitiates

Commanders and leaders
Octavian (WIA); Vipsanius Agrippa; Fufius Geminus; Statilius Taurus; Messalla Corvinus; Marcus Helvius; Menodorus (Menas)	Verzo (executed); Testimus (executed)

Units involved
3 legions A fleet	3.000 Iapodes (35 BC.); 12.000 Dalmatae (34 BC.);

Octavian (the future emperor Augustus) made his first attempt to occupy the northern Illyrian region (roughly modern Croatia) from 35 B.C. to 33 B.C. This conflict came shortly after he achieved a definitive victory over Sextus Pompey in Roman Sicily and before the decisive clash with his fellow triumvir, Mark Antony, in Roman Greece and Ptolemaic Egypt. Octavian was wounded in battle during the first conflict. However, the triumph for his victories was delayed and celebrated only after the defeat of Mark Antony and Cleopatra.

In the course of the Illyrian War, Octavian conquered (in addition to some less serious foes) the Iapodes and Delmatae tribes, and parts of Pannonia around Segestica/Siscia. However, the majority of the future provinces of Pannonia and Dalmatia were subdued by Tiberius during his Pannonian War (12–9 BC) and Pannonian-Dalmatian Rebellion (AD 6–9). These conflicts were initiated by preparations for war against Maroboduus, particularly through the recruitment of soldiers in Illyricum.

== Historical context ==
When Caesar was killed (Ides of March, 44 BC), the Dalmatians rebelled again, thinking that Roman power resided in the dictator who had just died, and they objected to paying tribute to the governor of Illyricum, Publius Vatinius. The latter, although he attempted to use force against them, was attacked and suffered the annihilation of as many as five of his cohorts. At the same time, the senate of Rome determined to transfer its army, along with the province of Macedonia and Illyricum to one of Caesar's assassins, Marcus Junius Brutus. Vatinius was, therefore, forced to fall back to Dyrrhachium, which was located in Macedonia, where the then governor, Gaius Antonius, brother of Mark, was also in serious trouble under Brutus' attack. A large part of Vatinius's forces defected and sided with Brutus, who then laid siege to Gaius Antonius at Apollonia. The fact, however, that they had to defend themselves against the armies of the triumvirs, Mark Antony and Octavian, who wanted to avenge Caesar's death and were gathering the necessary forces for the decisive clash, which later took place at Philippi (42 B.C. BC), did not allow the Romans to deal with the Illyrian rebels, although Vatinius was granted the triumph de Illyrico on July 31, 42 BC.

In 40 BCE, following the defeat of Caesar's assassins and the creation of a second triumvirate, Octavian and Antony divided the Illyrian area with the pact of Brindisi. Octavian received the northern part and the entire Roman West (apart from proconsular Africa, left to Marcus Aemilius Lepidus), and Antony the southern part with Macedonia, along with the entire Roman East. The demarcation line was placed where the old Illyrian capital of Scodra was located. In 39 BC, Gaius Asinius Pollio, to whom Antony had entrusted the government of the province of Macedon as proconsul, penetrated the territory of the Parthini, leading a military campaign that brought the Romans final victory in the area around Dyrrachium, so much so that it earned him a triumph on October 28 of the same 39 BC. Wilkies argues that these operations were short-lived and conducted to keep the legions active, as opposed to leaving them idle in their winter quarters, as well as intended to punish the alliance the Parthini had previously concluded with Brutus. According to other Latin writers, however, the operations were conducted against the Delmatae, and at the end of the war weapons, flocks, and lands were confiscated from them, and Pollio was given the victorious title of Delmaticus. Moreover, Wilkes does not believe that Pollio could have fought against the Delmatae, as they were too far from the province of Macedonia, which belonged to Mark Antony's sphere of influence; much closer was Illyricum, which belonged to Octavian.

=== Casus belli ===
While Syme believed that Illyricum was the most important strategic region of the Roman Empire, Wilkes believes that it was necessary for Octavian to secure control of the road that connected northern Italy (Gallia cisalpina) with the middle/lower Danube, to the eastern frontier. This route passed through important (and future) Roman administrative/military centers such as Siscia and Sirmium on the Sava, Singidunum on the Danube, Serdica in Thrace, all the way to Byzantium (the future Constantinople). Hence, if the entire area south of the Danube was to be secured, the Empire had to put in place a vast strategic plan contemplating the conquest of the whole of Illyricum, far more decisive than the conquest of Germania Magna.

1. The first objective of these campaigns was - Velleius Paterculus and Cassius Dio report it - to make sure that these military operations would be useful for Octavian's legionaries to practice against a real enemy, and not "slumber in idleness," in view of the far more decisive and forthcoming war against Antony, given the growing disagreements between the two.
2. Another goal, certainly no less significant, was to defend the northeastern Alpine sector of the attacks of neighboring peoples and their failure to pay tribute owed to the Romans. The peoples who were creating the greatest problems were the Iapodes, the Segestans, the Dalmatians (Delmatae), the Daesitiates (Daesitiatae), the Liburnians, and the Pannonians. The Iapodes, defined by Appian as a strong and savage tribe, repelled the Romans twice within the last twenty years (55-36 B.C.), and invaded their territories as far as Aquileia, managing to sack the Roman colony of Tergeste (Trieste).
3. Added to these populations from the Illyrian-Pannonian area was the risk of a possible attack by the Dacians, although the previous kingdom of Burebista had weakened and split into several kingdoms after the demise of the great Dacian ruler (44 BCE). Moreover, plans for a conquest of Dacia had already been designed earlier by Caesar, shortly before his death, a project that Octavian strongly wanted to bring to fruition in the footsteps of what his adoptive father had left unfinished.
4. However, the main strategic reason was to aim at joining the two proconsular provinces of Illyricum and Macedonia, in a vast area that would carry Roman rule as far as the Danube, and be placed under the control of a number of Augustan legates, under whose command 6-7 legions and related auxiliary units were then placed.

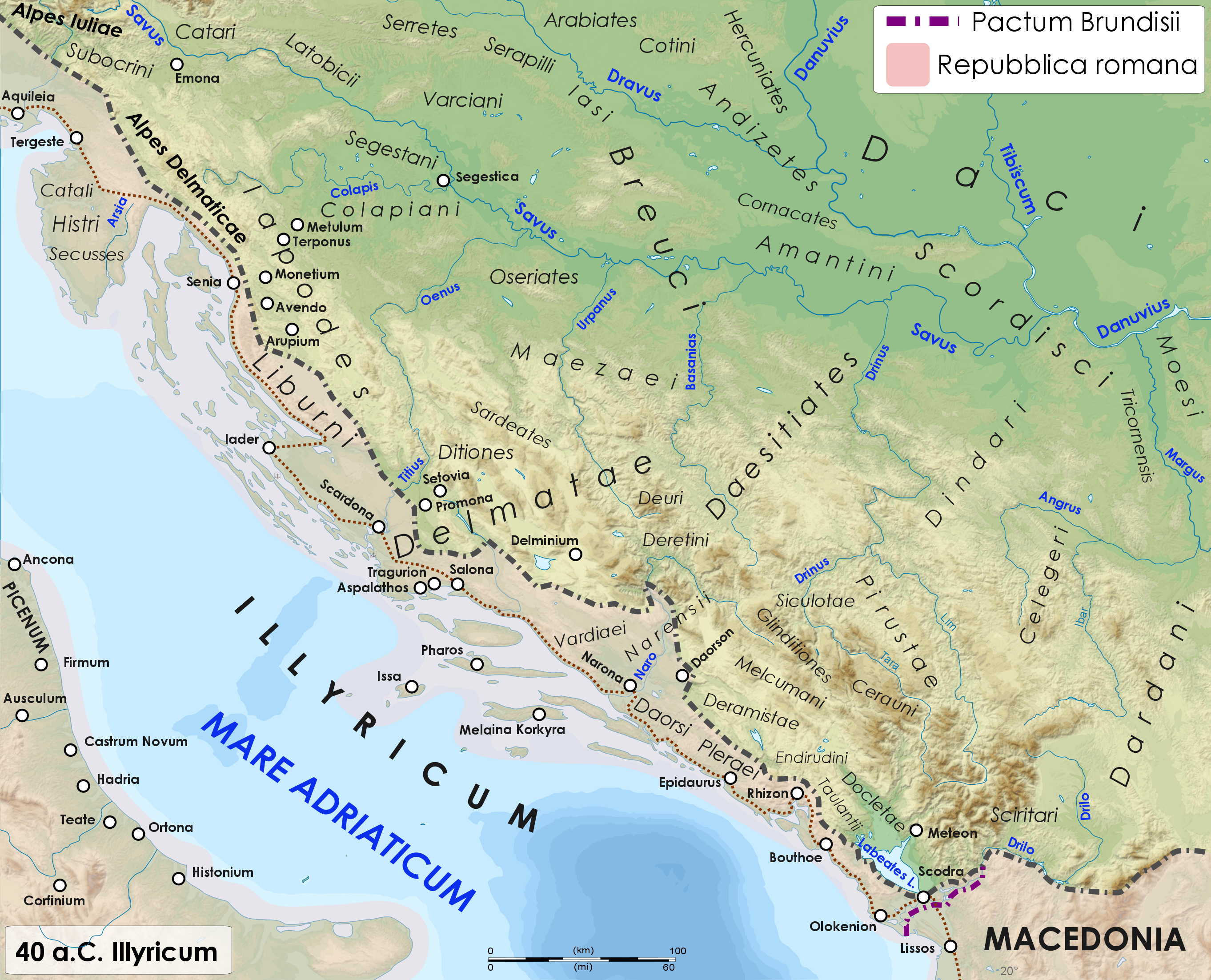
Roman Illyricum, Illyrian and Pannonian populations at the time of the pact of Brindisi between Octavian and Mark Antony (40 BC).

== Forces in the field ==
=== Romans ===
Based on Gonzales' assumptions, the legions involved were almost certainly Legio XIII Gemina, XIV Gemina, and XV Apollinaris, all of which had been formed earlier by Caesar (XIII, XIV, and XV).

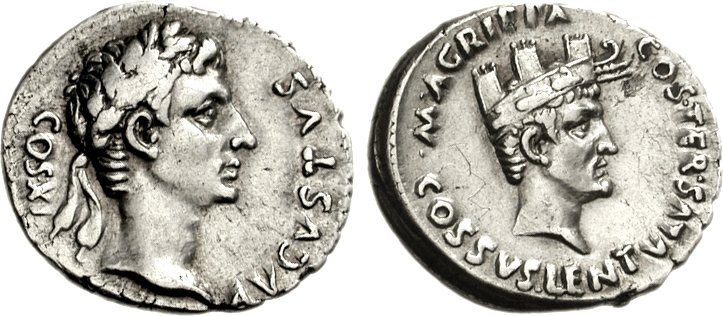
Octavian and his close friend, Agrippa, a major military collaborator.

In addition, a fleet of populations allied with the Romans (Taurisci and Norici) was also used, which sailed along the Drava to the Danube and then up the Sava. It was placed under the leadership of a certain Menodorus (Menas).

During the preparations for the military campaign it is known from Cassius Dio that, when some of the soldiers who had been discharged mutinied, since they had not received their severance pay, and asked to return to service in the ranks of Octavian's army, he gathered them into a single legion, so that they would be separated from the others and it would be difficult for them to engage the other legionary units in case they wanted to rebel again. By doing so, this unit could be disbanded with great speed. In fact, when they no longer proved as disciplined as before, he sent some of the older ones as colonists to Gaul, thinking that this reward would give them good hope for the future and silence them. However, since they continued to be insubordinate, he had them all gathered together as if they had been summoned for some other purpose, surrounded them with the rest of the army, took away their weapons, and dismissed them permanently. In this way they understood the determination and strength of their commander. Eventually their continued pleas and requests for forgiveness caused Octavian to pardon them and reintegrate them back into the ranks of his army, partly because he needed useful soldiers at least for so many different tasks, fearing that Antony, with whom he was now at loggerheads, would appropriate them.

== Campaigns ==
Appian of Alexandria recounts that Octavian subdued numerous populations of the Illyrian area such as the Oxyaei, Perthoneatae, Bathiatae, Taulantii, Cambaei, Cinambri, Meromenni, and Pyrissaei in a (first) military campaign. It seems that these populations formed a compact group in the far southwestern part of Illyricum. Some of them survived later as communities of the Conventus iuridicus of Narona. They were therefore settled between the Narenta and Drilon rivers.

In a later effort, he also defeated Carni and Taurisci, who were located north of Aquileia; then Interphrurini, Docleatae (near the city of Doclea), Naresii (from the Narenta River valley) and Glintidiones, peoples who inhabited the southern part of Illyricum, south of the Delmatae. From these peoples he obtained the tributes they had previously been unwilling to pay. Once these peoples had been conquered, the Hippasini (a name completely unknown and whose whereabouts are unknown) and the Bessi (a population of Thrace, a long way from the theater of Octavian's military campaigns), again according to Appian, were overcome by fear and surrendered. Others, on the other hand, who had previously revolted, such as the Meliteni of Melita and the Corcyreni of Corcyra Melaina, who inhabited the islands and practiced piracy, were attacked and subdued by the fleet that came from Sicily, while the young men were put to death and the rest of the population sold as slaves. He finally had all the ships surrendered by the Liburnians so as to prevent them from practicing piracy again in the future.

=== 35 BC campaign ===
The first campaign moved from the city of Aquileia, where the "headquarters" of some legions were located, and from the Liburnian port of Senia, then crossed the Velebit and entered the plain of the Lika River. Octavian led experienced military people with him, such as his fraternal friend Marcus Vipsanius Agrippa, trusted legate Gaius Fufius Geminus, the former suffect consul Titus Statilius Taurus, and military tribune Marcus Valerius Messalla Corvinus (certainly in 35 B.C.).

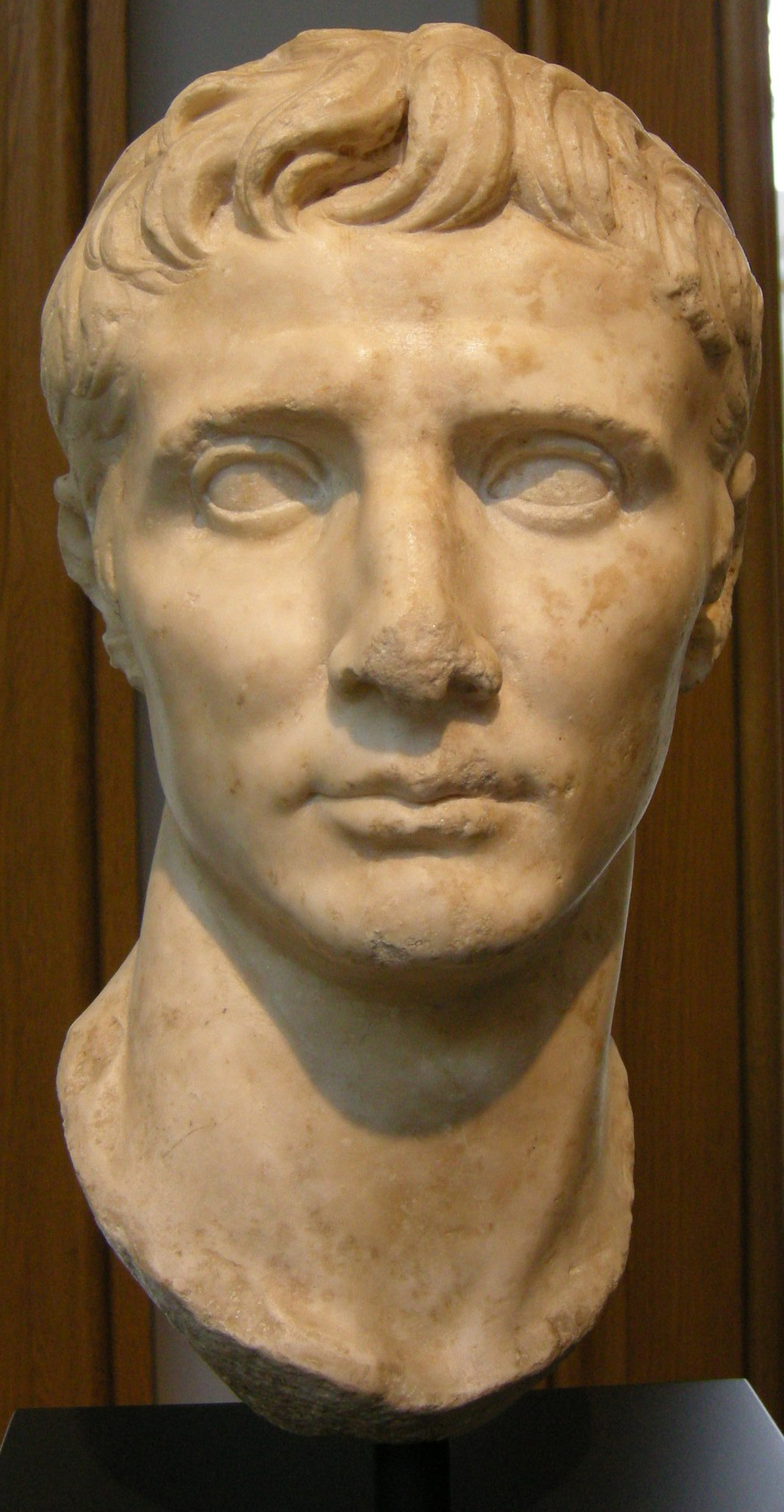
Bust of Augustus (Getty Museum, Los Angeles)

Appian relates that Octavian initially advanced against the Iapodes, via a steep and difficult road, especially since the enemy had obstructed its path, cutting down numerous trees. The route of march that Wilkes hypothesizes is the one that led from Tergeste to Senia (Senj), and then penetrated through the chain of mountains of the Great Chapel. In fact, as soon as the Roman armies penetrated into enemy territory, the indigenous peoples took refuge in the nearby forests. The Moentini of Monetium (Brinje), the Avendeatae of Avendo (Crkvina, near Otočac), two tribes of the Iapodes, surrendered as soon as Octavian approached their territories. The Arupini of Arupium (Prozor), on the other hand, who were the most numerous and fearsome warriors among the Iapodes, when the Roman armies approached, fled into the forests abandoning their towns and villages. However, Octavian avoided burning those places, hoping that they would surrender so that they could reoccupy them, which eventually happened. Before surrendering, however, they prepared to ambush the army, which was advancing into their territory. Octavian, who had expected such behavior, sent contingents to occupy some peaks that lay on the flanks of the road the rest of the legions were traveling. And when his soldiers tried to move the logs brought down by the enemy, the Iapodes suddenly jumped out of the bush and engaged in battle, wounding several legionaries. Eventually the Romans prevailed, killing many of the enemies, partly thanks to the arrival of reinforcements from the heights, those whom Octavian had taken care to have occupied earlier, and who had followed the main column of their comrades closely down the valley.

From there Octavian divided his army into several marching columns (one to cover the central valley and two to parallel the surrounding heights), and advanced eastward in the direction of the Colapis River and across the Dinaric Alps (in the area of Mala Kapela, Plješivica). The region he was crossing was thickly forested and mountainous, with rare clearings, while the few Illyrian fortresses were perched on hilltops. The rest of the Iapodes returned, therefore, to take refuge in the forests, abandoning their main city, whose name was Terponus, which Octavian occupied shortly afterwards but did not burn it, hoping that they would surrender. And so they did shortly thereafter.

After conquering Terponus, the Roman army continued in the direction of Metulum (present-day Cakovac near Ogulin), the capital of the Iapodes, which was located on a high and steep mountain, backed between two ridges with a narrow valley in between. Some 3,000 belligerent and well-armed young men were holed up there, who could easily have held back the Romans, who had surrounded the walls. Octavian gave orders to raise a siege ramp, which the Metulians tried hard to disrupt. Thus it was that, thanks to constant assaults carried both by day and night, and a constant launching of projectiles from the top of the walls (whose throwing artillery had been obtained from Brutus's earlier retreat after the siege of Mutina in 43 B.C.), the city's defenders were able to raise new walls before the outer circle crumbled under the blows of the legions. The Romans, once past the first circle of walls, burned it and rushed against the new line of fortification, this time erecting two different siege ramps, from which they then threw four bridges toward the top of the enemy walls. For the purpose of distracting their attention, Octavian sent some of his troops to the rear of the city, while he ordered the others to cross the bridges to the apex of the walls. To observe the result, he climbed to the top of a high tower.

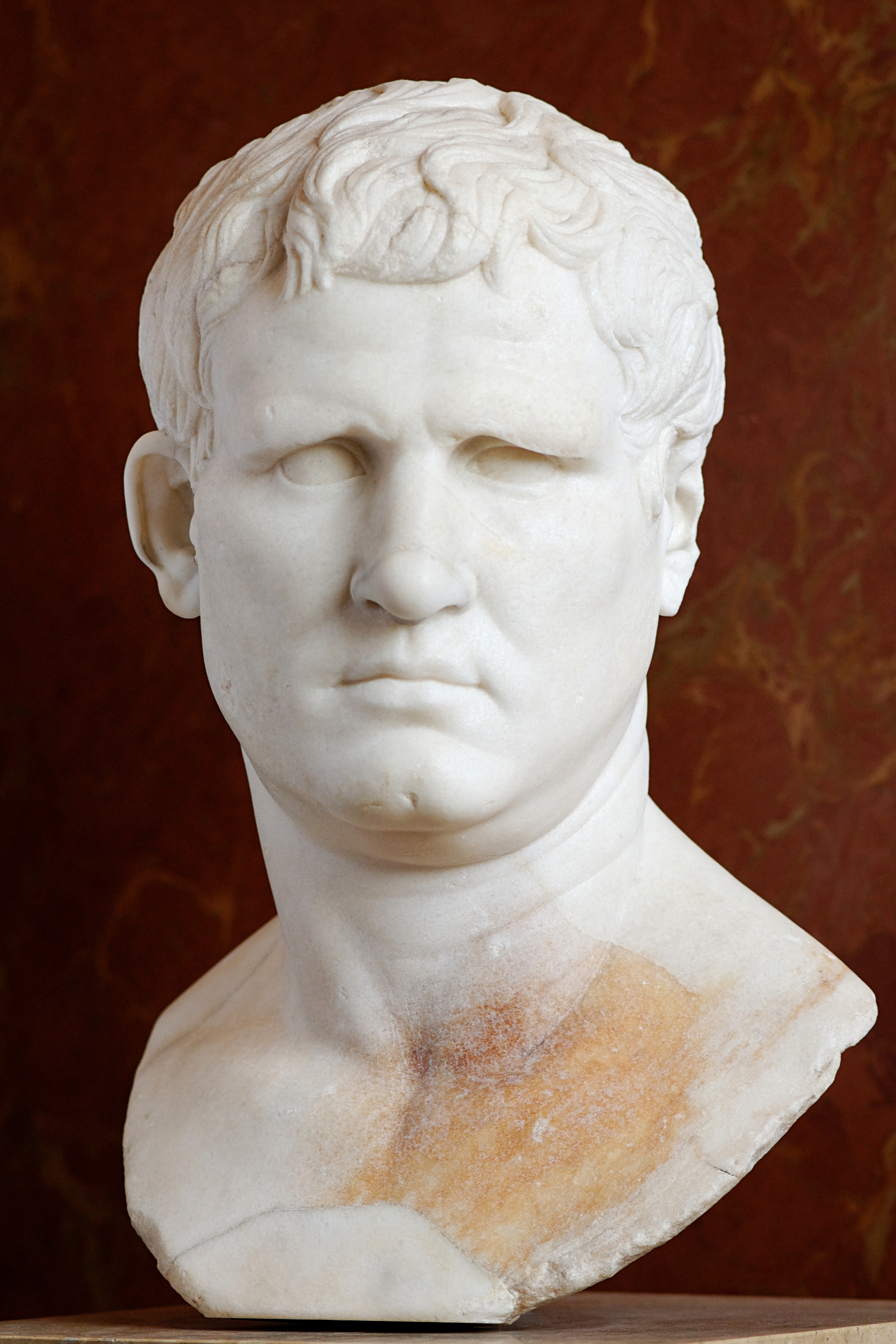
Bust of Marcus Vipsanius Agrippa (from the excavations at Gabii, now in the Louvre Museum, Paris)

Thus it was that he observed some of the barbarians running down the parapet to counter the Romans who were crossing the bridge, while others, unseen, tried to weaken the other bridges by striking them with their long spears. And the fact that they managed to bring down one, then a second, so that when the third bridge collapsed, the Romans were in absolute panic. No one dared to cross the fourth bridge until Augustus jumped down from the tower and, after scolding his soldiers, grabbed a shield and headed for the bridge.

"Marcus Vipsanius Agrippa and Hieron, two of his generals, his bodyguard, Lucius, and a certain Volas ran with him; only these four men, and a few other armed men. And when he was about to cross the bridge, the other legionaries, overcome with shame, rushed after him into the midst of the battle. So the [fourth] bridge also collapsed, because the weight [of the combatants] exceeded its capacity, and the men on it fell to the ground, one on top of the other. Some were killed, others were carried away with broken bones."

— Appian, The Illyrian Wars, 20).

Suetonius tells us that Octavian:

"[...] during the war in Dalmatia he was also wounded: in combat he was struck by a stone in the right knee, in another clash he was wounded in the leg and arms by the collapse of a bridge."

— Suetonius, Augustus, 20).

And though Octavian was wounded in his right leg and both arms, he quickly climbed the tower and waved his arms to show that he was safe and sound, fearing that his men, frightened by his possible death, might retreat. Not wanting to give the enemy the impression that he was retreating, he decided to have new bridges built at once, ready for a new attack, so as to strike terror into the hearts of the inhabitants of Metulum, who thought they had won a great victory. The next day the Metulans sent messengers to Octavian, offering him fifty hostages of his choice and promising to accept a garrison in the city, allowing them to quarter on the highest part of the hill, while they would be content with the other side.

"When the garrison came in and ordered them to lay down their arms, they were very angry. They sent their wives and children quietly into their council chamber, accompanied by their guards, who had orders to set fire to the building if things went wrong. So in desperation, they decided to attack the Romans. And because they launched the attack from a lower position against the Romans, who were on higher ground, they were completely overwhelmed. Then the guards set fire to the council hall, and many women killed first their children and then themselves. Others, holding their still-living children in their arms, jumped into the flames. Thus all the young men of Metulum died in battle, while most of the non-combatants died in the fire."

— Appian, The Illyrian Wars, 21).

Not only was the city completely destroyed by its own inhabitants, but the other Iapodes also preferred to surrender. And while a Roman contingent was left with them, the bulk of the army continued following the upper Colapis valley in the direction of Segesta (the future Siscia, at the confluence of Sava and Colapis), the capital of the Pannonian Segestans. The Posenians, newly subdued and belonging to one of the communities of the Iapodes, rebelled, but the Roman legate named Marcus Helvius (whom Syme relates to the poet Helvius Cinna), sent against them, succeeded in nipping the revolt in the bud. Meanwhile, Octavian devastated the Pannonian territory, which was located along the Colapis River, during the eight-day march to reach the Sava River.

Once he reached Segesta (a city very well defended by strong walls and surrounded by the two rivers), a strategic location of paramount importance for an advance eastward and convenient for a war against the Dacians and Bastarnae, Octavian sent the Segestans his terms of peace, asking them to have a garrison stationed in the city and to have as a guarantee of their good conduct one hundred hostages. He could then quietly use the city as a base of operations in his war against the Dacians. He also demanded as many food supplies as they were able to provide. While the leaders of the city agreed to his demands, the common people, on the other hand, were furious to consider handing over hostages to the Romans, perhaps because they were not their own children but those of the notables. And when the Roman garrison was approaching, unable to bear the sight of them, they furiously closed the gates and positioned themselves on the walls, ready to defend them. Octavian immediately gave orders to build a bridge across the river and surround the enemy oppidum with a ditch and a palisade, and having blocked them within the fortifications, he had two siege ramps erected. Against these the Segestans made frequent assaults, trying to destroy them with torches by throwing them from the top of the walls. And when the besieged received outside aid from other Pannonians, Octavian renewed his efforts to reinforce the defenses, destroying part of this relief force and putting the remainder to flight, so much so that they desisted from new aid in the future.

A fleet of peoples allied with the Romans (Taurisci and Norici) was also used, which sailed along the Drava to the Danube, then up the Sava until it reached the Pannonian city by river. It had been placed under the leadership of a certain Menodorus (Menas) and was used in combination with Roman infantry. During the clashes, Menas, formerly a freedman of Sextus Pompey, was killed. Appian relates that "the Romans had previously attacked the country of the Segestans twice [in 119 B.C. and on another occasion], but having never obtained hostages or anything else, the Segestans became very arrogant."

The city finally fell after 30 long days of hard siege, so much so that Octavian admired their courage. Once this important stronghold was captured, Octavian left 25 cohorts there under the orders of Gaius Fufius Geminus, and returned to Rome. The conquest of Siscia was to be the prelude to an advance against the Bastarnae and Dacians, now orphaned by Burebista and divided by factional struggles.

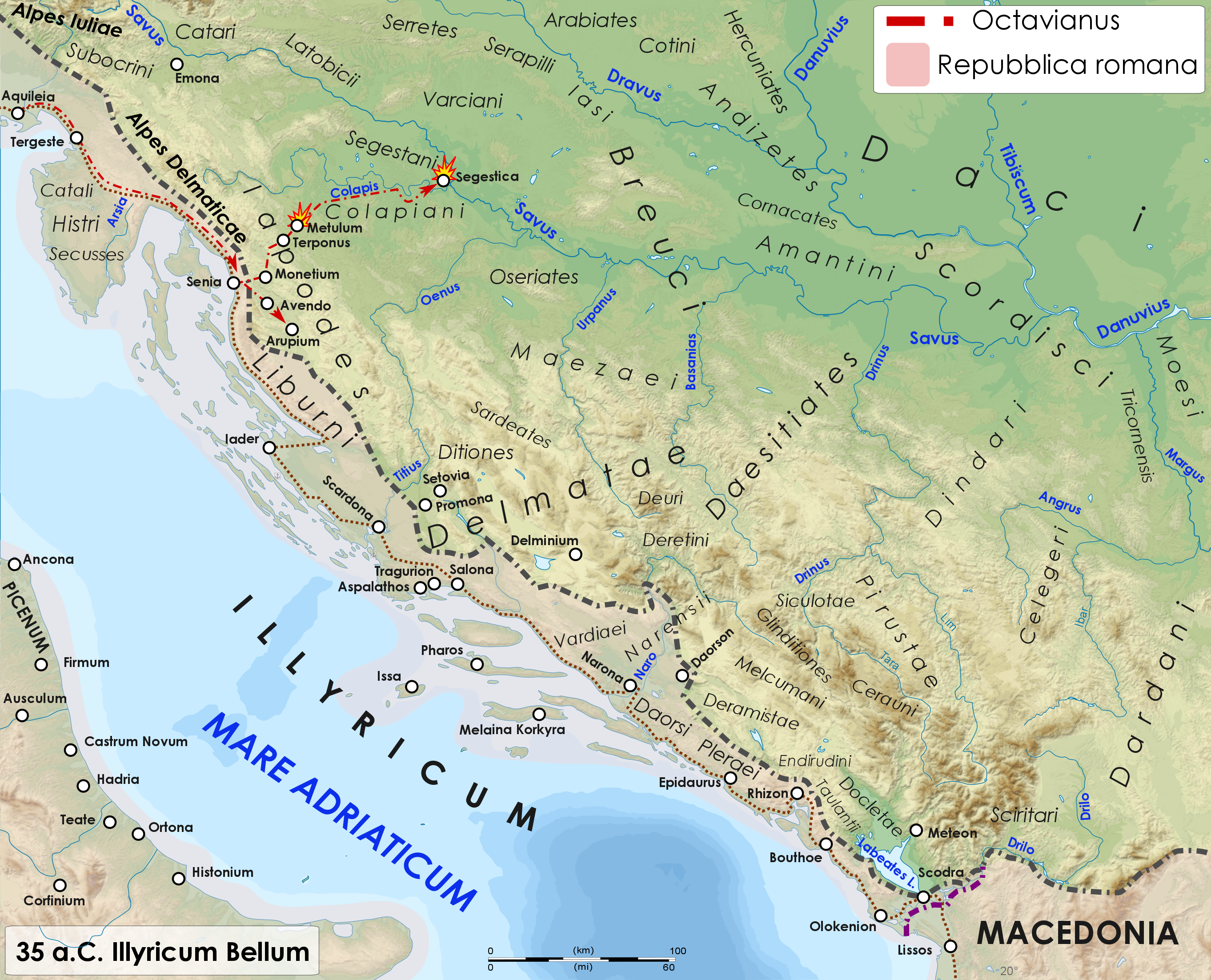
Octavian's first military campaign in Illyricum (35 BC).

=== Campaign of 34 BC ===
During the winter of 35-34 B.C.E., a rumor that turned out to be false informed Octavian that the Segestans had massacred the garrison left in their main city. Octavian, who was still in Rome, had to leave in a hurry. And although the garrison had been endangered by a sudden uprising, losing many men, the Romans had succeeded the next day in completely suppressing the revolt. Octavian then moved his army toward Dalmatia, another country of the Illyrians, bordering Taulantia.

Octavian was now intent on turning his attention further south, against the powerful tribe of the Delmatae, accompanied or perhaps preceded by the trusted Agrippa. And it does not appear that he was more interested in the Dacians and Bastarnae. The Dalmatians, after the massacre of their five cohorts in the time of Aulus Gabinius and the taking away of their vexilla (48 B.C.), were elated with their success, so much so that they had not laid down their arms for ten years. And when Octavian advanced against them, they made an alliance among themselves to give each other mutual aid in war. They thus succeeded in gathering an army of more than 12,000 fighters under a general named Verzo, who first occupied the city of the Liburnians, Promona, and fortified it, even though it was in an extremely strong place because of the nature where it stood. It was in fact a mountain stronghold, surrounded on all sides by hills. Most of the Dalmatian forces were located within the city, although some detachments were placed to guard the surrounding hills, watching the Romans from high positions. Octavian, who was on the plain below in plain view, began to draw a wall around the entire city, but secretly sent some of his bravest men to search for a route to the hills around. So it was that, having taken the route through the woods, they reached the Dalmatian positions in the night and killed the guards as they slept, signaling their victorious action to the Roman commander. Meanwhile, Octavian laid siege to the bulk of the enemy army and sent a second army to take possession of the newly occupied enemy fortifications on the hilltops. Dismay, confusion, and terror fell upon the barbarians, for they believed they were being attacked from all sides. Especially those who were still holding out on the hills, alarmed by the fear of being cut off from their water supply, fled to the city of Promona.

Octavian surrounded the oppidum and two hills that were still in the enemy's possession with a vallum seven and a half kilometers long. When Testimus, another Dalmatian commander, led a new army to help the besieged, the Romans went to him and drove him back toward the mountains, as he tried to find a gap in the ring road before it was completed, to enter Promona. And when the besieged made a sortie in aid of reinforcements, they were not only repelled, but the Romans pursued them until they entered the city with them, where they killed a third. The rest took refuge in the Citadel, at whose gates a Roman cohort was placed to guard them. On the fourth night the barbarians made another sortie, succeeding in repelling the Roman cohort. Octavian, coming to the aid of his men, succeeded in driving back the enemy and, on the following day, received their surrender. The cohort that had abandoned its position would be the subject of decimation, meaning that one man out of every ten was randomly killed. The lot fell on two centurions among the others. As a further punishment, the survivors were ordered to eat barley instead of wheat for the rest of the summer.

Once Promona was taken, Testimus preferred to disband his army and had it scattered in all directions. According to Appian of Alexandria, the Romans were thus unable to pursue them for long, as they had divided themselves into small bands, keeping well away from the roads so as to leave no trace of their movements. They headed, therefore, for Synodion (Sunodium), which was at the edge of the forest where Aulus Gabinius' army had been trapped by the Dalmatians in a long, deep gorge between two mountains (the Čikola valley). They prepared to ambush Octavian's army, but once they arrived, he burned the oppidum and sent soldiers along the tops of the surrounding mountains on both sides as he passed through the gorge. As he advanced, he cut down trees, captured and burned every oppidum he found on his way, until he reached Setovia. The city was besieged by the Romans, however, attracting a new army of Dalmatians who had come to the rescue, but were unable to penetrate inside the city. During the siege, Octavian was struck by a stone in the knee and was injured for several days. When he recovered, he returned to Rome to serve as consul along with Lucius Volcatius Tullus (33 B.C.E.) and left the task of carrying out the war to Titus Statilius Taurus. Strabo adds that, before returning to Italy, he also took possession of the city of Ninia (Knin on the river Titus) with a secondary military column.

At the same time, a Roman fleet, which had departed from southern Italy, faced the Liburnian pirates admirably, subduing the inhabitants of the islands of Melite (Mljet) and Corcyra Nigra (Korčula) as well as the people of Taulanti. And the legates who had moved northward subdued part of the Carni and Taurisci people (in the area of Vrhnika), and reached the oppidum of Emona.

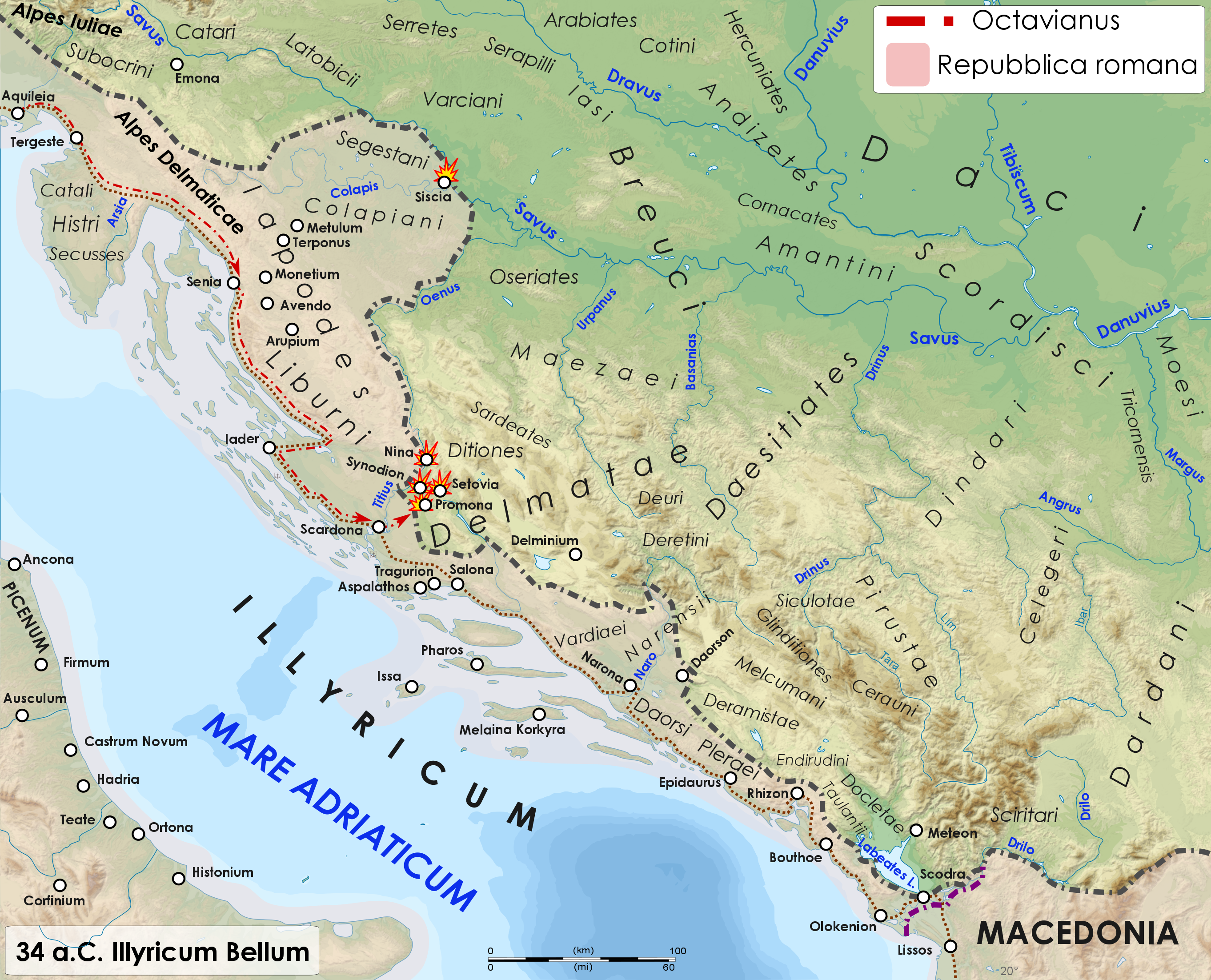
Octavian's second military campaign in Illyricum (34 BC)

=== Campaign of 33 BC ===
Octavian, having returned to Dalmatia in the spring of 33 B.C.E., having surrendered the office of consul after only a day to Lucius Autronius Paetus, received the submission and payment of tribute from the Delmatae of the coast, who had lost their capital Setovia, thanks to the legate Titus Statilius Taurus. They returned to him the vexilla they had taken from Gabinius in 48 B.C., which were placed in the Portico of Octavia, as well as sending 700 of their sons as hostages.

Signa militaria complur[a per] alios d[u]ces ami[ssa] devicti[s hostibu]s re[cipe]ravi ex Hispania et Gallia et a Dalmateis.
"After defeating the enemies, I recovered several military insignia lost by other commanders in Spain, Gaul and Dalmatia".

—Augustus, Res Gestae, 29)

After subduing the Dalmatians, Octavian proceeded with his advance against the Derbani (who demanded peace by offering Rome hostages and to pay tribute as in the past), before fighting. Similarly, other tribes upon his arrival offered him hostages as a guarantee of the pacts signed with them, such as the Docleti (whose capital was Doclea, north of Podgorica), the Glintidioni, the Naresi, the Interfrurini, the Cambei, the Cinambri, the Taulanti, and the Meromenni (the latter seven tribes were part of the group of small peoples Pliny the Elder placed in southeastern Dalmatia near the coast, between the Narenta and Drilon rivers). Some, however, were not reached because Octavian did not enjoy good health, so much so that no hostages or any treaties could be obtained from them. It seems, however, that they were not subdued until later. Thus the entire country of the Adriatic coast of the Illyrians was subdued. Not only therefore the peoples who had rebelled against Rome, but also those who had never before been under its rule. So it was that Octavian achieved a triumph over the Illyrians (who for Cassius Dio and Livy were both the Pannonians, the Delmatae, and the Iapodes).

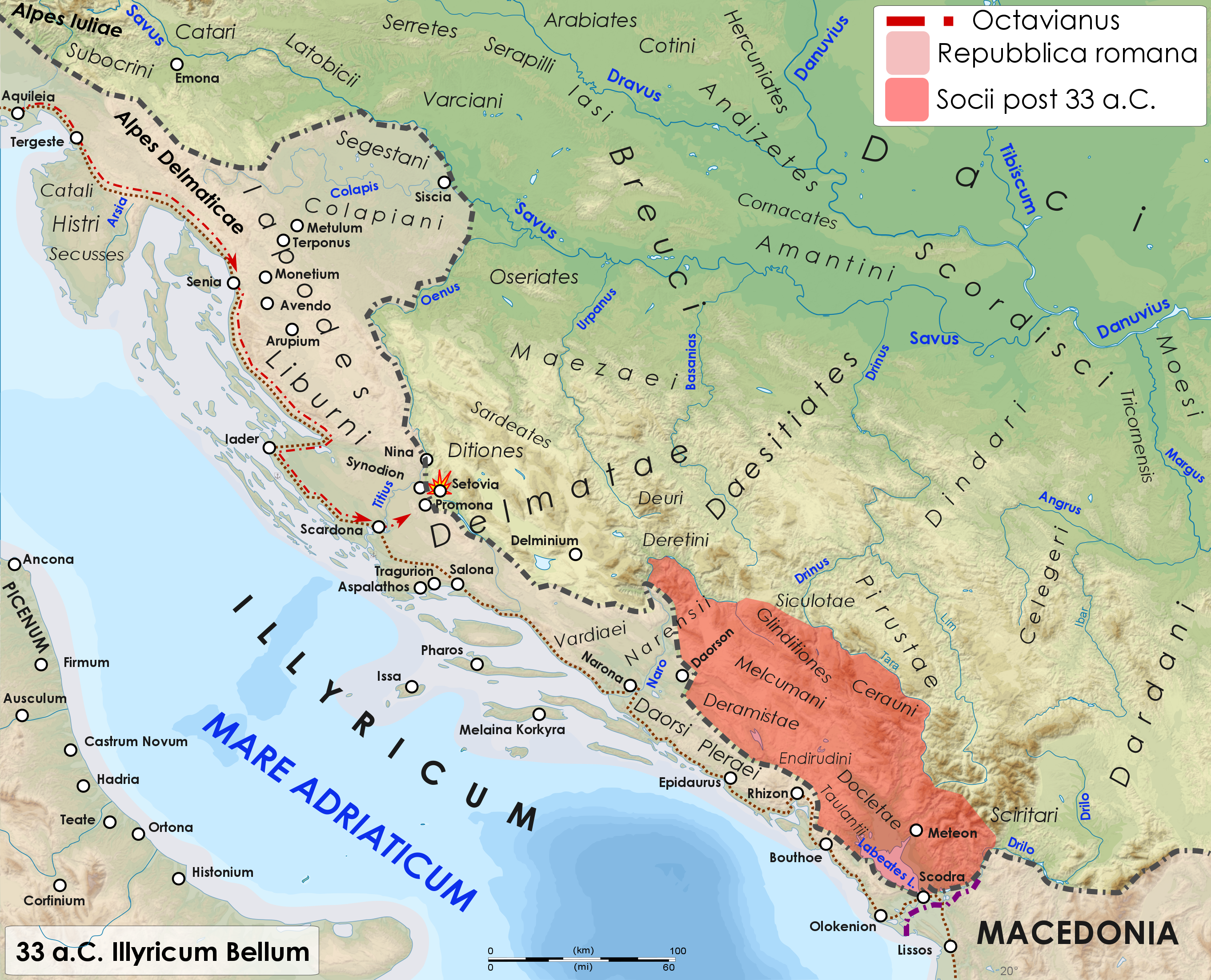
Octavian's third and final military campaign in Illyricum (33 BC). Highlighted in brighter red are the territories of the Romans' allies at the end of the year.

== Aftermath ==
Though his campaign was lauded by the Senate, Octavian would only celebrate the victory later, postponing the triumph in Rome and celebrating it alongside that of the victory he achieved over Antony at Actium in 31 BC. It was not until years after the conflict that Augustus acknowledged the contributions of his commanders Agrippa and Statilius Taurus. However, the commanding officers under Octavian and his rival Antony celebrated triumphs during the 30s BC, such as Statilius Taurus in 34 BC, before he built the city of Rome's first fully stone amphitheater. Octavian was also able to return the military standards previously lost by Aulus Gabinius in Illyricum, which Octavian housed afterwards at the Porticus Octavia in Rome.

According to some modern historians such as Ronald Syme, Johannes Kromayer, or Wilkes, this first war did not involve the interior territories of present-day Bosnia or the lower Sava valley. In fact, in the north the Roman armies did not advance beyond the stronghold of Siscia, while in the south they did not cross the Dinaric Alps, operating not far from the Adriatic coast.

At the end of the third Illyrian campaign, Octavian left a legionary garrison at Siscia. In 32 BC, a number of colonies were founded along the Illyrian coast: at Pola and Iader, while new settlers went to increase the presence of Roman citizens in the old Caesarian colonies of Salona, Narona and Epidaurum.

New disagreements with Mark Antony forced Octavian to suspend his military action, and the Dalmatian-Pannonian campaigns could only be resumed with Marcus Vipsanius Agrippa in 13 BC and, after the latter's death, with his stepson Tiberius in 12-9 BC. However, the complete subjugation of the area did not occur until the end of the Dalmatian-Pannonian revolt of 6-9 BC.

Octavian and Agrippa used the proceeds of the Illyrian wars to finance the construction of public buildings in Rome, including the Basilica of Neptune, the Saepta Iulia and the Baths of Agrippa.

== Bibliography ==
=== Ancient sources ===
- Appian. Roman History (in Ancient Greek). Vol. The Illyrian Wars. (English translation).
- Octavian. Res gestae divi Augusti (in Latin). (Latin text and English translation).
- Aurelius Victor. De Caesaribus (in Latin). (Latin text and French translation).
- Aurelius Victor. De viris illustribus urbis Romae (in Latin). (Latin text and French translation).
- Julius Caesar. Commentarii de Bello Gallico (in Latin). (Latin text
- Cicero. Epistulae ad Atticum (in Latin). (Latin text and English translation).
- Cicero. Orationes Philippicae (in Latin). (Latin text).
- Cassius Dio. Roman History (in Ancient Greek). (Greek text and English translation).
- Eutropius. Breviarium ab Urbe condita (in Latin). (Latin text and English translation).
- Fasti triumphales (in Latin). (Latin inscription AE 1930, 60 and English translation).
- Florus. Epitome (in Latin). (Latin text and English translation).
- Goldsworthy, Adrian (2014). Augustus: First Emperor of Rome. New Haven: Yale University Press. ISBN 978-0-300-17827-2.
- Livy. Periochae ab Urbe condita (in Latin). (Latin text).
- Horace. Odes (in Latin). (Latin text and Italian translation).
- Orosius. Historiarum adversus paganos libri septem (in Latin). (Latin text).
- Pliny the Elder. Naturalis historia (in Latin). (Latin text and English version).
- Plutarch. Parallel Lives (in Ancient Greek). (Greek text and English translation).
- Southern, Pat (2014) [1998]. Augustus. Roman Imperial Biographies (second ed.). London and New York: Routledge. ISBN 978-0-415-62838-9.
- Strabo. Geographica (in Ancient Greek). (English translation).
- Suetonius. The Twelve Caesars (in Latin). (Latin text and Italian translation).
- Tibullus. Corpus Tibullianum (in Latin). (Latin text).
- Velleius Paterculus. Historiae Romanae ad M. Vinicium consulem libri duo (in Latin). (Latin text and English translation here and here).

=== Modern historiographical sources ===
- Julio Rodriguez Gonzáles (2003). Historia del las legiones romanas (in Spanish). Madrid.
- András Mócsy (1974). Pannonia and Upper Moesia: History of the Middle Danube Provinces of the Roman Empire. Londra: Routledge & Kegan Paul Books.
- Piganiol André (1989). Le conquiste dei romani. Milano: Il Saggiatore.
- Lindsay Powell (2019). Augusto in guerra. La lotta per la «pax romana» (in Italian). Gorizia: LEG Edizioni. p. 562.
- Ronald Syme (1971). Augustus and the south slav lands. Bucarest.
- Ronald Syme (1971). The campaigns of Octavian. Bucarest.
- Ronald Syme (2002). The roman revolution. Oxford: Oxford Univ. Press.
- J.J. Wilkes (1962). Studies in the roman province of Dalmatia. Durham: Durham University.
- J.J. Wilkes (1969). Dalmatia. Londra: Routledge & K. Paul. ISBN 978-0-7100-6285-7.
