= Latobici =

Celtic tribe

The Latobici or Latovici (Gaulish: Latobicoi) were a Celtic tribe dwelling in the southwestern part of what became the Roman province of Pannonia Superior, during the Roman period. They appear in the region around the middle of the 1st century BC, and their chief settlement at Neviodunum (present-day Drnovo, Slovenia) was raised to the rank of a municipium under the Flavian emperors, officially named municipium Latobicorum. Together with the Scordisci, they were one of the few Celtic communities in southern Pannonia, where most peoples were of Pannonian (Illyrian) stock.

== Name ==
They are mentioned as Latovici by Pliny (1st c. AD), as Λατόβικοι (Latóbikoi) by Ptolemy (2nd c. AD), and as Latobici on an inscription from Neviodunum (modern Drnovo) dated to 117–130 AD.

The ethnonym Latobici is a Latinized form of the Gaulish Latobicoi, which derives from the stem *lāto-, interpreted as meaning 'furor, ardour' (cf. Old Irish láth, Welsh llawd), (Note: Delamarre describes the meaning and etymology of the stem *lāto- as uncertain, noting that an alternative derivation from a root meaning 'flat, plain' has also been proposed for names built on it.) Some scholars have proposed an origin in the Celtic theonym Latobius (*Lātu-biyos 'Furious Striker'), translating Latobici as 'the lineage of Latobios'.

A homonym tribe, the Latobrigi (or Latobici), dwelled further northwest near the Helvetii. Whether they were actually related or even identical remains debated.

== Geography ==
The Latobici dwelled in the valley of the Krka river, around modern Drnovo, Trebnje, and Groblje pri Prekopi. The Barrington Atlas locates them north of the Colapiani, west of the Varciani, south of the Taurisci, and east of the Rundictes.

The principal centre of the Late Iron Age population of the area was at modern Novo Mesto, where several La Tène cremation cemeteries have been excavated, the earliest of them dated to the 3rd and early 2nd centuries BC. (Note: Kruta tentatively identifies the pre-Roman settlement at Novo Mesto with a Noviodunum, a common Gaulish place-name meaning 'new fortress'. This is a distinct name from the Neviodunum of Drnovo, the Roman-era civic centre of the Latobici, which lay some distance downstream.) In the Roman period the main settlements were Neviodunum at Drnovo, Praetorium Latobicorum (modern Trebnje), and Crucium (Groblje pri Prekopi).

== History ==
=== Origins ===
The Latobici appear in the southwestern corner of the later province around the middle of the 1st century BC, but their origin is explained in different ways in modern scholarship.

According to one view, they were a local formation that emerged from the break-up of the Taurisci complex. Venceslas Kruta regards them as a product of the disaggregation of the Tauriscan grouping at the time of the upheaval caused by Burebista, around the middle of the 1st century BC. Alka Domić Kunić notes that the Celtic Taurisci held the upper Sava valley until their defeat by the Dacians in the 60s BC, after which the Latobici, also Celts, are recorded in the area, having taken over control of the Alpine approaches. Radman-Livaja and Ivezić likewise observe that the Latobici had earlier formed part of the wider territory of the Taurisci, which was subsequently divided by Rome into smaller communities.

According to another view, they were immigrants to the Krka valley. András Mócsy held that the Latobici arrived in the upper Sava valley during the southward Celtic movement that Caesar describes as the migration of the Helvetii, bringing with them the custom of house-shaped cremation urns from the Saale region. Péter Kovács further identifies the Pannonian Latobici with a tribe mentioned by Caesar and dates their immigration to the mid-1st century BC. Hermann Vetters proposed to locate their origin in Noricum. Noting that inscriptions and shrines to the god Mars Latobius cluster in the catchment of the Lavant and along the ridge of the Koralpe, he suggested that the Latobici originally lived around Virunum and Flavia Solva as late as the 1st century BC, and from there either extended their territory southward or migrated to the region of the Krka.

Whatever their origin, the personal names attested in Latobician territory are consistently Celtic, which is taken as a firm indication of the tribe's Celtic character. Together with the Scordisci, the Latobici were one of the few clearly Celtic communities in southern Pannonia, where most of the population was of Pannonian (Illyrian) stock.

=== Roman period ===
The Latobici came under Roman authority at a relatively early date. After the fall of Segestica (Siscia) during the Illyrian campaign of Octavian in 35–33 BC, the Latobici and the neighbouring Varciani, who held the land between the Taurisci and the Colapiani, acknowledged Roman power, apparently without armed resistance. The conquest of southern Pannonia as a whole was completed under Augustus in the campaigns of 12–11 BC, the so-called Bellum Pannonicum. Pliny lists the Latobici among the peoples that had been of importance before the province of Illyricum was constituted.

Like the other tribes of southern Pannonia, the Latobici were drawn on heavily for the Roman auxilia, and the tribal name survived in unit titles such as the cohortes and alae Breucorum, Latobicorum, Varcianorum and Pannoniorum. The civitas Latobicorum, with its centre at Neviodunum (Drnovo), was raised to the rank of a municipium under the Flavian emperors and was officially named municipium Latobicorum, or more fully municipium Flavium Latobicorum. The town was assigned to the voting tribus Quirina and held the ius Latii. The new Latin name did not establish itself, however: on later inscriptions and in the road itineraries the town is again called Neviodunum, the older Gaulish name ('new fortress') that had remained in everyday use. Its population was mixed, combining the native Latobici with settlers of north Italian origin who had come up the Save valley.

The tribal name long outlived the municipium as a mark of origin. Latobici serving in the auxiliary cohorts of Upper Pannonia abroad identified themselves, together with men of Siscia and the Varciani, as cives Sisciani et Varciani et Latobici in a dedication set up at Samaria. The date of the inscription is disputed, with proposals ranging from the reign of Hadrian to the second Parthian war of the early 3rd century.

== Bibliography ==
- Burian, Jan (2006). "Latobici". Brill's New Pauly. doi:10.1163/1574-9347_bnp_e632480.
- de Bernardo Stempel, Patrizia (2015). "Zu den keltisch benannten Stämmen im Umfeld des oberen Donauraums". In Lohner-Urban, Ute; Scherrer, Peter (eds.). Der obere Donauraum 50 v. bis 50 n. Chr (in German). Frank & Timme. ISBN 978-3-7329-0143-2.
- Delamarre, Xavier (2003). Dictionnaire de la langue gauloise: Une approche linguistique du vieux-celtique continental (in French). Errance. ISBN 9782877723695.
- Domić Kunić, Alka (2006). "Bellum Pannonicum (12.–11. pr. Kr.): posljednja faza osvajanja Južne Panonije" [Bellum Pannonicum (12–11 BC): The final stage of the conquest of southern Pannonia]. Vjesnik Arheološkog muzeja u Zagrebu. 3rd ser. (in Croatian). 39: 59–164.
- Falileyev, Alexander (2010). Dictionary of Continental Celtic Place-names: A Celtic Companion to the Barrington Atlas of the Greek and Roman World. CMCS. ISBN 978-0955718236.
- Kovács, Péter (2014). A History of Pannonia during the Principate. Antiquitas. Reihe 1. Vol. 65. Bonn: Habelt. ISBN 978-3-7749-3918-9.
- Kovács, Péter (2018). "The northern border of the Pannonians and the river Drava". Acta Illyrica. 2: 217–229. ISSN 2490-3930.
- Kruta, Venceslas (2000). Les Celtes: Histoire et dictionnaire (in French). Paris: Robert Laffont. ISBN 978-2-221-05690-5.
- Lambert, Pierre-Yves (1994). La langue gauloise: description linguistique, commentaire d'inscriptions choisies (in French). Errance. ISBN 978-2-87772-089-2.
- Matasović, Ranko (2009). Etymological Dictionary of Proto-Celtic. Brill. ISBN 9789004173361.
- Mócsy, András (1974). Pannonia and Upper Moesia: A History of the Middle Danube Provinces of the Roman Empire. London: Routledge & Kegan Paul. ISBN 0-7100-7714-9.
- Radman-Livaja, Ivan; Ivezić, Hana (2012). "A Review of South-Pannonian Indigenous Anthroponymy". In Migotti, Branka (ed.). The Archaeology of Roman Southern Pannonia. BAR International Series. Vol. 2393. Oxford: Archaeopress. pp. 137–158. ISBN 978-1-4073-0985-9.
- Talbert, Richard J. A. (2000). Barrington Atlas of the Greek and Roman World. Princeton University Press. ISBN 978-0691031699.
- Vetters, Hermann (1977). "Virunum". In Temporini, Hildegard (ed.). Politische Geschichte (Provinzen und Randvölker: Lateinischer Donau-Balkanraum) (in German). De Gruyter. ISBN 978-3-11-085288-2.
