= Cavii (tribe) =

The Cavii were an Illyrian tribe. They lived close to Lake Shkodër. Their main settlement was Epicaria, which is thought to be probably located around modern-day Pukë. They are occasionally mentioned by ancient writers.

Gentius the Illyrian king during the third Illyrian war sent his half-brother Caravantius, detaching 1,000 infantry and 50 horsemen, attacked the Cavii, failing to capture one of their cities while ravaging the fields of the city of Caravandis.
