= Oseriates =

Oseriates may refer to:

- Oseriates (moth), a genus also known as Pediasia
- Oseriates (tribe), an ancient Illyrian people
