= Eugenium =

Unlocated ancient village or fort in Illyria

Eugenium was a village or fort of the Illyrian Parthini whose location is still unknown. Gurëzezë near Cakran has been suggested as a possibility.

== See also ==
- Parthini
- List of settlements in Illyria
