= Kreshpan =

- Village
- Location within Albania
- Coordinates: 40°38′N 19°35′E
- Country: Albania
- County: Fier
- Municipality: Fier
- Administrative unit: Cakran
- Time zone: UTC+1 (CET)
  - Summer (DST): UTC+2 (CEST)

Kreshpan is a village in Fier County, southwestern Albania. It is located 13 km south-east of the city of Fier. At the 2015 local government reform it became part of the municipality Fier.

Geographic & Geodetic coordinates and the average fee Kreshpan :: Geographic 1.Kordinatat Geographic Breadth: 40 ° 37'30 "N Longitude: 19 ° 35'13" The average quota from sea level: 120m. The surface is About 9 square Km. Kreshpan eshe a village located 13 km south-east of the city of Fier. It is the first village at the entrance to the town of Cakran and the largest village on the number of population of this town. Kreshpan has an area around 9 km square, making it the main village on the map of scale 1: 25,000 of the Republic of Albania (the latest edition of this map is 1981) that has this nomenclature "K-34-124- A-a (Kreshpan) ". Kreshpan is a hilly area characterized by low average rainfall. Lower temperatures ranging up -3˚c -2˚c high temperatures range from 36C up to 40C.

== History ==
The antiquity of life on Kreshpan speak many facts and documents. Convincing argument is the fact of finding coins, in 1982, of one of the Illyrian kings, the most famous king Monun. This fact speaks for living in this village in the early centuries of the second third, BC, apparently, part of the tribe neighboring black stones in Cakran.

According to Turkish First Registry (Arvanid Sancag) of 1431, in Kreshpan then living 31 families and a half (half considered a widow). Of these, 15 families and a half, have been subject to Hezir, while 16 families depending on Shahin. For this dependence can saktësohemi specialists history of sociologists, if there was to do with economic or administrative side organization.

Also in the flow of religious conversions, with the correct documents, it confirmed that in 1825, residents of Kreshpan had returned completely, 100%, from Christian to Muslim. In my opinion, the main reason must have been: another opportunity for survival.

While it may require even more in the archives, but it had issued so far, kreshpanjakët should have been the main base of the 7,000 soldiers who were considered "Regular Army" under the command of Alush Frakulla, in the years 1830–1837, which raised rebelled against the Ottoman Empire. There is some doubt booth (Guard), who served in the Coast of Qarri, Pesujku hill, Coast of Muxhita etc., To ensure the protection of the garrison to self-determination of Alush Frakulla in Latifaj (Hanishte), which was connected by a long tunnel about 250–300 meters, with the main storage point at the top of Pesujku hill have been our ancestors, kreshpanjakët. So, there are many documents and facts that generations of ancestors of our village, have been involved in all Mallakastriote movements, or even national, in Ioannina, in the years 1912–1915, in 1920 in Vlora, 1922 -1924 with Fan Noli, 1935, with anti-Zogite movement, where many of them were sentenced to 101, during the National Liberation War, from 1939 to 1944, or even against gangs, organized by neighboring countries attempting the overthrow by force of power just set after liberation.

== Agriculture ==
Families Kreshpan gained ground most of Agrarian Reform. They began to reach high yields, in the first years of the fifties.

Even with the onset of collectivization, those who earlier of whom later joined by means of force in the Agricultural Cooperative of village. Even in this time of work trying to increase more and more yields in cereals and bread, farming and fruit growing. The best chance, in this period was that most areas of the hills, their mezhdurinave pages of Kreshpan, covered by bushes, was shpyllëzuan eu cultivated with olive orchards or vineyards others. One part, was cleaned of pine and oak ripyllëzuan. Other plots little selected were used as arable land.
