= Celticisation =

Historic process of conquering and assimilating by the ancient Celts

Celticisation, alternatively spelled Celticization, was historically the process of conquering and assimilating by the ancient Celts, or via cultural exchange driven by proximity and trade. Today, as the Celtic-inhabited areas significantly differ, the term still refers to making something Celtic, usually focusing around the Celtic nations and their languages.

== Ancient history ==
During the 1st millennium BC, the early Celts expanded from a core territory in Atlantic Europe to Iberia, the British Isles and later also the Balkans and Central Europe, and are assumed to have "Celticized" (Pre-Celtic) earlier populations such as Illyrians and Thracians in the Balkans and Basques elsewhere.

=== Illyria and Pannonia ===
The Celticization in Pannonia began as early as the 4th century BCE. La Tene type finds are characteristic in Pre-Roman Pannonia and are considered a marker to variations in the degree of Celticization. Among the Illyrian tribes some were Celticized to varying degrees (some completely) like the Pannoni and the Dalmatae. A type of wooden oblong shield with an iron boss was introduced to Illyria from the Celts. Illyrian chiefs and kings wore bronze torcs around their necks much as the Celts did.

The Celts had two settlements that later became cities in Illyria, namely Navissos and Segestica. In Thrace they had Serdica (modern Sofia, Bulgaria), Tylis, founded by Gauls, Dunonia, Singidunum and Taurunum.

Many Celtic tribes or parts of Celtic tribes migrated to Illyria, Thrace and Dacia.

The gradual Celticization of all of Pannonia took place in the 3rd century BCE. Names became Celtic, as seen in Roman times, and Celts had established control north of the Sava and south and west of the Danube. In the western half and west of Pannonia the Pre-Celtic language disappeared. By the first half of the 1st century BCE the language of the Illyrians in Northern Dalmatia was completely Celticized. There is an abundance of Celtic names in Illyria sometimes making the Illyrian ones seem few. (Note: "Pinnes and Tato are present, from the Japodes Diteio and Ve(n)do, and a few names are of Celtic origin, Kabaletus, Litus, Nantanius, Sarnus, Sinus, Sisimbrius and Vepus." (Wilkes, 1992, p. 76) "A few names which occur in the upper Neretva valley around Konjic appear to be of Celtic origin: Bolo, Bricussa, lacus, Mallaius ..." (Wilkes, 1992, p. 75) "The number of Illyrian names in that area, Genthena, Tatta, Dasius and Thana is small compared with the Celtic: Aioia, Andetia, Baeta, Bidna, Catta, Dussona, ..." (Wilkes, 1992, p. 82) "Four names are accepted as definitely Celtic: Nantia, Nonntio, Poia and Sicu. Mellito has a Greek and Celtic element, while the Celtic associations of Ammida, Matera and Seneca remain questionable." (Wilkes, 1992, p. 79) "The number of Illyrian names in that area, Genthena, Tatta, Dasius and Thana is small compared with the Celtic: Aioia, Andetia, Baeta, Bidna, Catta, Dussona, Enena, laca, Madusa, Matisa, Nindia, Sarnus, ..." (Wilkes, 1992, p. 82) "Apart from some names of Thracian origin, Bessus and Teres, and some Celtic names, Arvus, Belzeius, Cambrius, laritus, Lautus, Madussa and Argurianus (either Thracian or Celtic), the only name of south Illyrian origin is Plares." (p. 84)) Those parts of Pannonia that had not been conquered by the first Celtic invasion were already Celticized by the beginning of the 3rd century BCE. The Dalmatae had been Celticized by the 3rd century BCE. In the region of Pannonia as a Roman province Celticization had almost completely eradicated Illyrian culture.

=== Alps and Italy ===
In the Alpine region as a whole, there is evidence that the non-Celtic elements had, by the time of Augustus, been assimilated by the influx of Celtic tribes and had adopted Celtic speech. According to Livy, the "sound" of the Raeti's original tongue (sonum linguae) had become corrupted as a result of inhabiting the Alps. This may indicate that at least some of the tribes lost their ancestral Raetic tongue to Celtic. Celticisation also finds support in the Roman practice of twinning the Raeti with their neighbours to the North, the Vindelici, who are regarded by most historians to have been Celtic-speakers.

By the 4th century BCE the Veneti had been so Celticized that Polybius wrote that the Veneti of the 2nd century BCE were identical to the Celts except for language. The Greek historian Strabo (64 BCE–24 CE), on the other hand, conjectured that the Adriatic Veneti were descendant from Celts who in turn were related to later Celtic tribe of the same name who lived on the Belgian coast and fought against Julius Caesar.

At the beginning of the 13th century BC, a large body of Proto-Celts crossed the Alpine passes and settled in the western Po Valley, founding the Canegrate culture. These proto-Celts maintained their homogeneity for only a century, after which they assimilated the native Ligurian populations and from this union a new phase called the Golasecca culture emerged, which is nowadays identified with the Lepontii and other Celto-Ligurian tribes. Strabo wrote that in his time all the inhabitants of the Po Valley had been Celticized, with the exception of the Ligurians, and they are very similar to the Celts in their way of life. Later historians wrote that because of the strong Celtic influences on their language and culture, the Ligures became known in antiquity as Celto-Ligurians.

== Contemporary usage ==
=== Languages ===
In the modern era, there are attempts made to reverse the effects of centuries of Anglicisation and other assimilations and re-introduce Celtic languages. Most particularly in Wales, the Welsh language has seen a halt in its decline and even signs of revival, with approximately half a million fluent speakers. There have also been recent attempts to revive the Cornish language, and there are now several schools in Cornwall teaching in Cornish. The Breton language remains endangered as the number of its speakers continues to decline.

Gaelicisation is a sub-branch of celticisation, derived from Gaels, referring to modern-day Scotland, Ireland and Isle of Man.

== See also ==
- Pre-Celtic
- Goidelic substrate hypothesis
