= Gurëzezë =

Archaeological site in Albania

Gurëzezë is an archaeological site in western Albania.

== Location ==
Gurzezë is located at an elevation of 508 m above sea level near Cakran. The territory of Gurëzezë site includes two hills and a pass through them. It offers views of the entire area from the Cakran plain to the Gjanica valley, and is located at the road that connected Apollonia with Byllis and Antigonia. Another ancient road passing through Gurëzezë connected the Vjosa valley with the territory of the Amantes, Byllis and Dimale. The wider area has a rich variety of sites dating from the Neolithic to the Roman and Byzantine eras.

== Description ==
A precise chronology of the site has not been achieved yet. The earliest settlement is a proto-urban one with an area of 0.7 hectares. It is located on the higher part of the site in the northeast. It has walls of limestone blocks, without mortar, which are hewn on the supporting surfaces. The ancient city has an area of 23 hectares and is located at the southwest part of the site. The construction of the walls, 2100 m in length, took place in a period from the early 4th century BC to the late 3rd century BC. In Late Antiquity new walls were constructed in line with the proto-urban ones. Their purpose might have been to defend the rural population against attacks from Visigoths in the late 4th century.

== Identification ==
It has been suggested that the Gurëzezë site might be the location of ancient Eugenium. Gurëzezë is likely to have been part of the settlements of the Bylliones.
