= Balaites =

Ancient Illyrian tribe

The Balaites were an ancient tribe in southern Illyria, modern-day Albania. The tribe is known from a number of Greek inscriptions, otherwise unmentioned among ancient written sources.

== Location ==
It has been suggested that the Balaites probably were a subdivision or local district of Apollonia, located on the fringes of its territory, and that they were not one of its citizen communities. Neritan Ceka raised the likelihood that the ancient fortifications near the modern-day Gurëzeza or Klos might have been belonging to the Balaites. M.B. Hatzopoulos based on observations by N.G.L. Hammond proposes a location at Treport on the Bay of Vlorë.

== Organization and Onomastics ==
The political organization and institutions of the Balaites were inspired either from Apollonia or Corfu.

The most important archaeological finding related to them is a public memorial carved of chalkstone (so-called chalkoma) that conveys the thankful message to a certain poliperarchon Aristen of Parmenon on behalf of the koinon of the Balaites. The text provides a list of the Hellenistic political institutions of the Balaites, the ecclesia and the presbyters, whereas the prytaneis and the tamia (tax collector) are even mentioned by name. The social organization of the Balaites suggests a developed Hellenistic community which, according to the scholars, might have been located within the radius of cultural influence of Apollonia, most likely close to the territories of the Amantes or Bylliones territory. Neritan Ceka and Olgita Ceka (2017) concluded that the ethnic features of the Balaites were similar to the nearby Illyrian Bylliones, while some personal names were similar to the nearby Corinthian colony of Apollonia, suggesting an affiliation of the Balaites to a political community in the town of Gurëzeza. The honorary decree of the Balaites displays their onomastics, political institutions and calendar features which are written in the Greek language with the use of Greek technical terms (Epirote and Corinthian), perhaps under the influence of nearby Corinthian colony of Apollonia. Balaites formed a koinon (league). The offices of the Balaties were of mixed character and displayed Corinthian, Epirote and Macedonian features. Based on the specific inscriptions Hatzopoulos (1997) concluded that the koinon of the Balaites had a Greek identity.

The text of the decree includes two forms of ethnicons: Βαλαιειταί (Balaieitai) and Βαλαιιταί (Balaiitai). The latter are indicated as the recipients of Aristen's philanthropic actions and later of the thanksgivings of the peripolarchos, while the former are indicated as the political subject issuing the decrees and as the political community that was official recipient of the crown mutually conferred by Aristen. The difference between these two terms, the ethnos with its territory on one hand, and the tribal polis, which was the capital of the ethnos on the other hand, seems to be observed in other epigraphy and numismatic material of the area, including the cases of the Hellenized Illyrian city-states of Dimale (Dimallitan/Dimalla) and Byllis (Byllionon/Byllis).

== See also ==
- List of ancient tribes in Illyria

== General bibliography ==
- Cabanes, Pierre (1988). Les illyriens de Bardulis à Genthios (IVe–IIe siècles avant J.-C.) [The Illyrians from Bardylis to Gentius (4th–2nd centuries BC)] (in French). Paris: SEDES. ISBN 2718138416.
- Ceka, Neritan (2013). The Illyrians to the Albanians. Tirana: Migjeni. ISBN 9789928407467.
- Ceka, Neritan; Ceka, Olgita (2017). "A Peripolarchos inscription from the castle of Matohasanaj". In Luan Përzhita; Ilir Gjipali; Gëzim Hoxha; Belisa Muka (eds.). New archaeological discoveries in the Albanian regions: proceedings of the international conference 30–31 January, Tirana 2017. Vol. 1. Botimet Albanologjike. Academy for Albanian Studies, Institute of Archaeology. pp. 488–508. ISBN 978-9928-141-71-2.
- Hatzopoulos, M. B. (1997). "The boundaries of Helenism". Epirus, Four Thousand Years of Greek History and Civilization. Ekdotike Athenon. ISBN 960-213-377-5.
- Hatzopoulos, M.V. (1997b). "The Boundaries of Hellenism". In M. V. Sakellariou (ed.). Ηπειρος: 4000 χρόνια ελληνικής ιστορίας και πολιτισμού. Ekdotike Athenon. ISBN 9789602133712.
- Jaupaj, Lavdosh (2019). Etudes des interactions culturelles en aire Illyro-épirote du VII au III siècle av. J.-C (Thesis). Université de Lyon; Instituti i Arkeologjisë (Albanie).
- Lasagni, Chiara (2019). Cresci Marrone, Giovannella; Culasso Gastaldi, Enrica (eds.). Le realtà locali nel mondo greco: Ricerche su poleis ed ethne della Grecia occidentale. Studi e testi di epigrafia. Edizioni dell'Orso. ISBN 978-88-6274-962-6.
- Wees, Hans van (2008). Sécurité Collective Et Ordre Public Dans Les Sociétés Anciennes: Sept Exposés Suivis de Discussions Par Hans Van Wees ... [et Al.] : Vandoeuvres, Genève, 20-24 Août 2007. Librairie Droz. p. 134. ISBN 978-2-600-00754-2.
