= Tynteni =

Tynteni, or Tyntenoi (Ancient Greek: Τυντενοί) was the name of an Illyrian tribe, living in villages, or of a town named Tynte, that may be the same as Daton, a Greek colony in Thrace. The Tynteni and Tynte are only attested in coins. If an actual tribe, the Tynteni were located north of lake Ohrid. Their coins, whose minting stops in the early 5th century BC, have similarities to those of Ichnae, that was in the archaic age Paeonian but later became Greek. The coin legend is Greek: ΤΥΝΤΕΝΟΝ.

The Atintani seem to have originated from the obscure Tynteni.

== See also ==
- Paeonia (kingdom)
- List of ancient tribes in Thrace and Dacia
