= Sardiatae =

Illyrian tribe

The Sardiatae or Sardiates (alternatively: Sardeatae, Sardeates or Sardiotai) were an Illyrian tribe that lived in Dalmatia, in the Pliva valley around the area of Jajce and Šipovo, in present-day Bosnia and Herzegovina. They are mentioned by Pliny the Elder, who locates them in the conventus iuridicus of Salonae, and reports that they had 52 decuriae. They are also mentioned by Ptolemy, and in the Libri Coloniarum ("Book of Colonies") of the Gromatici Veteres (c. 5th century AD) along with the Tariotes.

The Sardiates are documented, along with other Illyrian tribes like the Pirustae and Baridustae, in the epigraphic material of Alburnus Maior in Roman Dacia, a mining town where several Illyrian peoples moved by the time of Roman emperor Trajan. A great number of inscriptions were recently found reporting the tribal name of the Sardiatae, which were produced after they moved to the new town in Dacia from their ancient tribal areas in Dalmatia. A collegium Sardiatensium/Sardiatarum is also attested in Alburnus Maior. The existence of collegia of the Sardiatae and of the Baridustae certainly suggests a location of those communities within or near the mining district.
