= List of ancient tribes in Illyria =

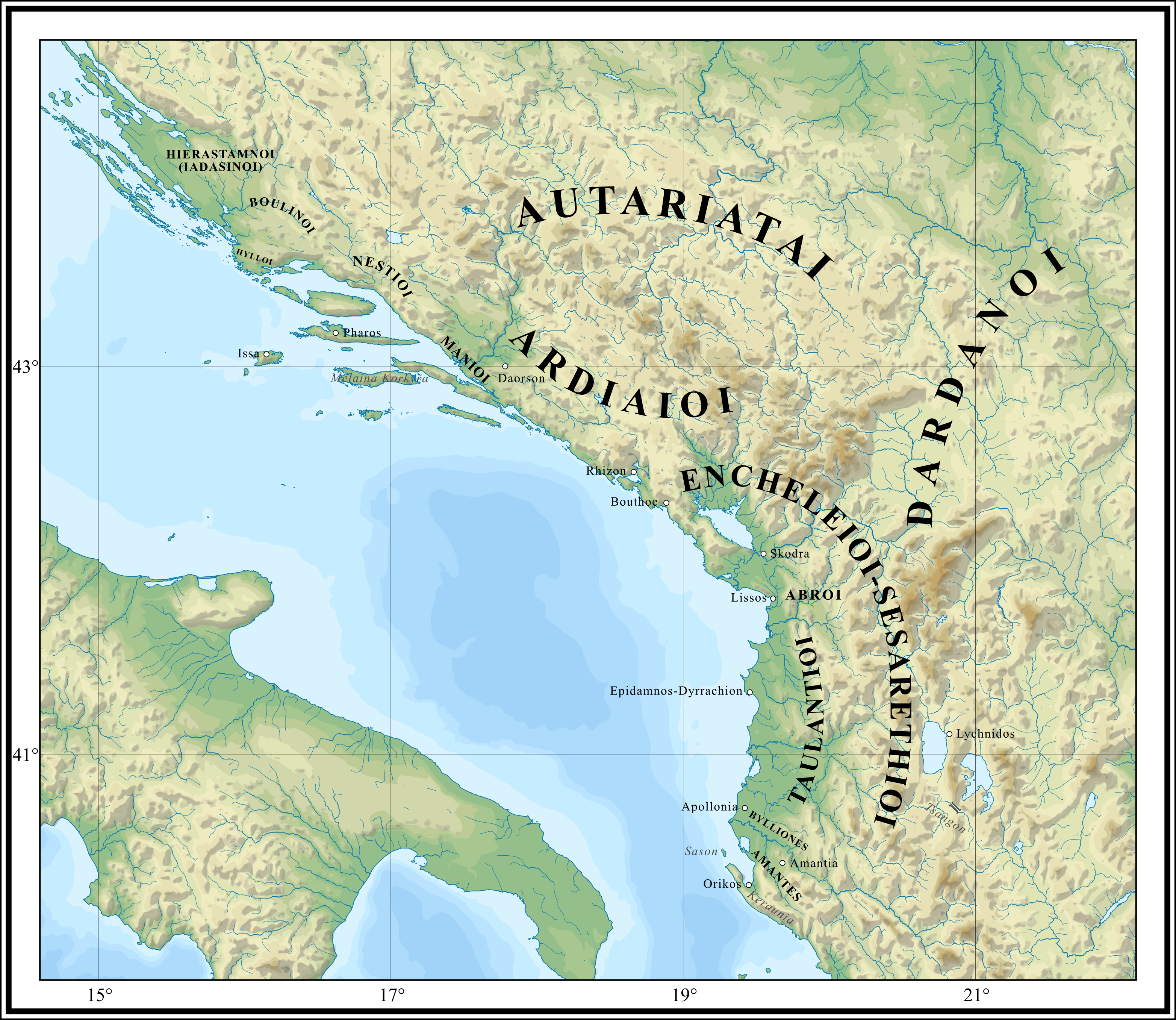
Illyrian tribes in the 7th–4th centuries BCE

This is a list of ancient tribes in the ancient territory of Illyria (Ancient Greek: Ἰλλυρία; Latin: Illyria). The name Illyrians seems to be the name of a single Illyrian tribe that was the first to come into contact with the ancient Greeks, causing the name Illyrians to be applied to all people of similar language and customs. The locations of Illyrian tribes/peoples prior to the Roman conquest are approximate, as sometimes many wholly different locations are given by ancient writers and modern authors (as in the case of the Enchelei).

After the Great Illyrian Revolt, the Romans deported, split, and resettled Illyrian tribes within Illyria itself and to Dacia, sometimes causing whole tribes to vanish and new ones to be formed from their remains, such as the Deraemestae and the Docleatae, some of them mixed with Celtic tribes (see Celticization). Many tribal names are known from Roman civitates and the number of their decuriae, formed of the dispersed tribes in Illyria.

== Illyrian ==
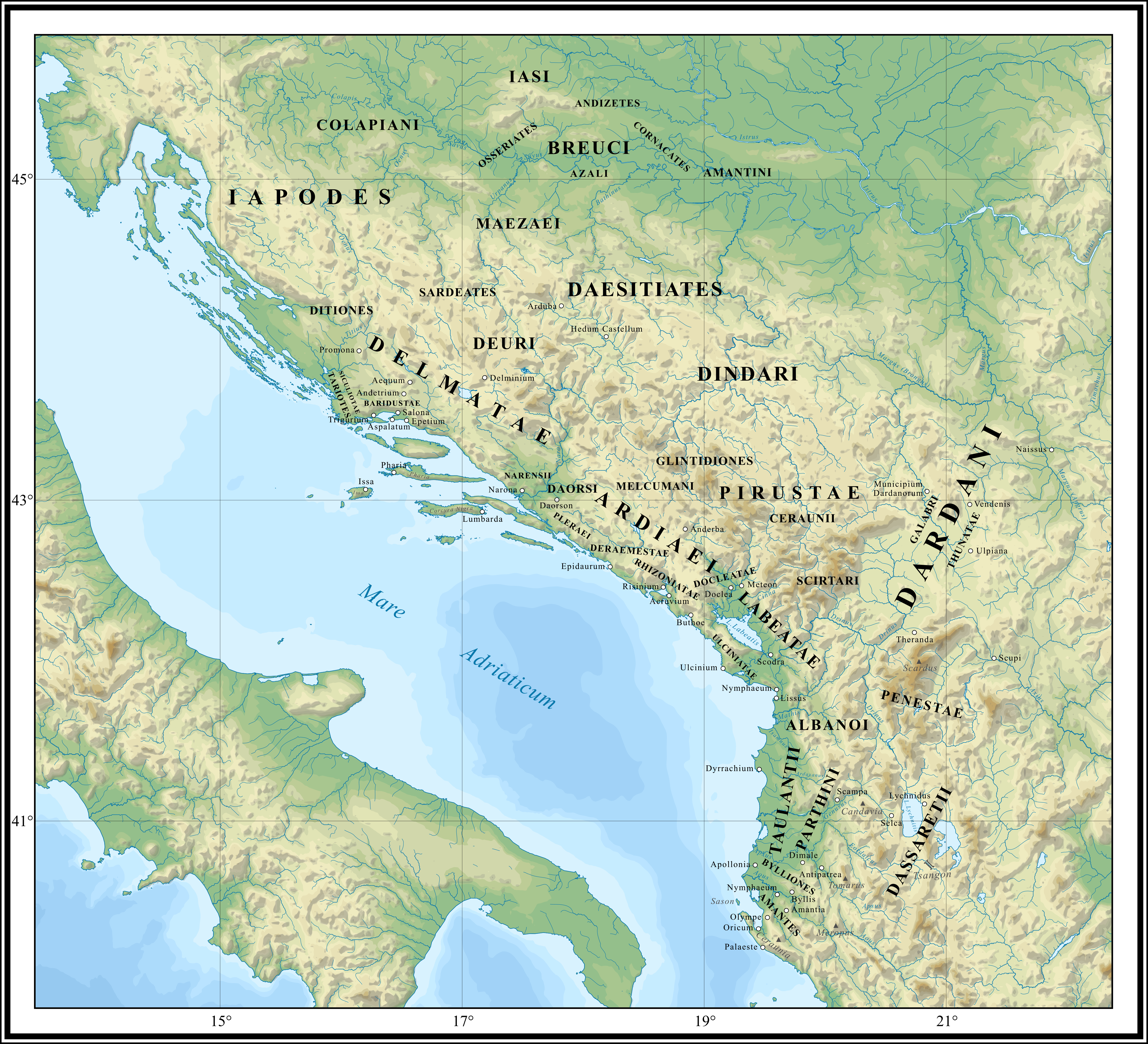
Illyrian tribes in the 1st–2nd centuries CE

=== Albani ===
The Albani (Latinized form of Ancient Greek: Ἀλβανοί, Albanoi) were an Illyrian tribe whose first historical account appears in a work of Ptolemy. They were the citizens of Albanopolis (Ἀλβανόπολις), located in the center of modern Albania, in the Zgërdhesh hill fort, near the city of Krujë. The national ethnonym of the Albanians is derived from this tribe.

=== Amantes ===
The Amantes lived in present-day south-western Albania. The site of Amantia has been identified with the location of their territory. The toponym has a connection with the modern Albanian term amë/ãmë ("river-bed, fountain, spring")

=== Ardiaei ===
The Ardiaei or Ouardaioi (Ancient Greek: Ἀρδιαῖοι, Οὐαρδαῖοι; Latin: Vardiaei, Vardaei) were an Illyrian people, originally residing inland, and eventually settling on the Adriatic coast. Strabo describes them as one of the three strongest Illyrian peoples, the other two being the Autariatae and Dardani. The political entity of the Ardiaei, which expanded in the south-eastern Adriatic, came to be identified with the Illyrian kingdom in the 3rd century BCE. Under the Ardiaean king Agron and his wife Teuta, the Illyrian kingdom reached its apex. It became a formidable power both on land and sea by assembling a great army and fleet, and directly ruling over a large area made up of different Illyrian tribes and cities that stretched from the Neretva River in the north to the borders of Epirus in the south, while its influence extended throughout Epirus and down into Acarnania. The Ardiaean realm became one of Rome's major enemies, and its primary threat in the Adriatic Sea. The dominant power of the Illyrian kingdom in the region ceased after its defeat in the Illyro-Roman Wars (229–168 BCE). In Roman times the Ardiaei had 20 decuriae

=== Autariatae ===
The Autariatae or Autariates (Ancient Greek: Αὐταριᾶται) were an Illyrian tribe that became prominent between the 6th and 4th centuries BCE. Strabo describes them as one of the three strongest Illyrian peoples, the other two being the Ardiaei and Dardani. After their defeat during the Celtic invasions of the Balkans in the 4th century, a part of the Autariatae who remained in Bosnia gradually adopted Celtic culture, while another part moved southwards and after an agreement with the Kingdom of Macedonia, 20,000 settled in the Parorbelian mountain range, in an area between modern south-eastern North Macedonia, northern Greece and south-western Bulgaria.

=== Balaites ===
The Balaites were an Illyrian tribe known from epigraphical findings only who were organizing themselves in a koinon, and it is likely that they lived in the vicinity of Apollonia.

=== Bathiatae ===
The Bathiatae were an Illyrian tribe.

=== Bylliones ===
The Bylliones (Βυλλίονες) were an Illyrian tribe. They were affected by a partial cultural Hellenisation. They constituted one of the most notable Illyrian koina of the Hellenistic period, with their territory featuring a network of several settlements. Byllis and Nikaia were their chief centres.

=== Cavii ===
The Cavii were an Illyrian tribe. They lived close to Lake Shkodër. Their main settlement was Epicaria. They are mentioned rarely by ancient writers.

=== Daorsi ===
The Daorsi or Duersi or Daorsii or Daorsei (Ancient Greek: Δαόριζοι, Δαούρσιοι) were an Illyrian tribe. Another name of the tribe was Daversi. The Daorsi had suffered attacks from the Delmatae that made them along with Issa seek the aid of the Roman state. The Daorsi fought on the Roman side, providing them with their strong navy abandoning Caravantius. After the Illyrian Wars, the Daorsi were given immunity. Their most important city was Daorson. They had 17 decuriae.

=== Dardani ===
The Dardani or Dardanians were a central Balkan people, among the oldest in the region. They were the most stable and conservative ethnic element among the peoples of the central Balkans, retaining an enduring presence in the region for several centuries. Ancient tradition considered the Dardani as an Illyrian people, and Strabo, in particular describes them as one of the three strongest Illyrian peoples, the other two being the Ardiaei and Autariatae. Their name is traditionally connected to the same root as dardhë, the Albanian word for 'pear', as well as Alb. dardhán, dardán, 'farmer'. The ethnonym Pirustae, which is attested since Roman times for a tribe close to the Dardani or living in Dardania, is considered to be the Latin translation of Dardani (cf. Latin pirus "pear"). Subgroups of the Dardani included the Galabri and the Thunatae, whose tribal names have been, respectively, connected to the Messapic Kalabroi/Calabri and Daunioi/Daunii in Apulia (south-eastern Italy), of Palaeo-Balkan provenance. In pre-Roman times the Dardani constituted their own Kingdom, often in conflict with their south-eastern neighbor—Macedon.

=== Dassaretii ===
The Dassaretii (Ancient Greek: Δασσαρῆται, Δασσαρήτιοι) were an Illyrian people who lived in the inlands of southern Illyria, between present-day south-eastern Albania and south-western North Macedonia. They were directly in contact with the regions of Orestis and Lynkestis of Upper Macedonia. The Dassaretii were one of the most prominent peoples of southern Illyria, forming an ethnic state. They made up the ancient Illyrian kingdom that was established in this region. Most scholars hold that the early 4th century BC Illyrian realm of Bardylis—the first attested Illyrian king—was centered along Lake Ohrid and east to the Prespa Lakes in Dassaretan territory, located on the border between Macedon and Epirus.

=== Deretini ===
The Deretini or Derriopes (Ancient Greek: Δερρίοπες) were an Illyrian tribe in Narona conventus with 14 decuriae.

=== Deuri ===
The Deuri or Derbanoi (Ancient Greek: Δερβανοί) were an Illyrian tribe. Other possible names are Derrioi. In a conventus held in Salona after the Roman conquest the Deuri had 25 decuriae.

=== Dyestes ===
The Dyestes or Dyestae (Ancient Greek: Δυέσται) were an Illyrian tribe located around the silver mines of Damastion. Only Strabo passingly mentions this tribe.

=== Enchelei ===
The Enchelei or Sesarethii (Ancient Greek: Ἐγχελεῖς, Σεσαρηθίους, accusative of *Σεσαρήθιοι) were an Illyrian tribe. Their name, given by the Greeks, meant "eel-men". In Greek mythology. According to E. Hamp, a connection with Albanian ngjalë makes it possible that the name Enchele was derived from the Illyrian term for eels Cadmus and Harmonia ruled over them. Several locations are hypothesized for the Encheleans: around Lake Ohrid; above Lake Ohrid, or in the region of Lynkestis south of the Taulantii.

=== Kinambroi ===
The Kinambroi (Ancient Greek: Κίναμβροι) were an Illyrian tribe. They surrendered to Octavian in 33 BCE.

=== Labeatae ===
The Labeatae or Labeates (Ancient Greek: Λαβεᾶται) were an Illyrian people that lived on the Adriatic coast of southern Illyria, around Lake Scodra (the ancient Lacus Labeatis). The dynasty of the last Illyrian kings (Scerdilaidas, Pleuratus, Gentius) was Labeatan. It is possible that the decline of the Ardiaean dynasty after Queen Teuta's defeat in the First Illyrian War against Rome caused the emergence of the Labeatan dynasty on the political scene. The last known Illyrian king, Gentius, was defeated in the Third Illyro-Roman war in 168. In Roman times the Labeatae minted coins bearing the inscription of their ethnicon.

=== Mazaei ===
The Mazaei or Maezaei (Ancient Greek: Μαζαῖοι, Μαιζαῖοι) were a tribal group, including 269 decuriae.

=== Melcumani ===
The Melcumani or Merromenoi or Melkomenioi (Ancient Greek: Μελκομένιοι) were an Illyrian tribe. The Melcumani had 24 decuriae.

=== Narensi ===
Narensi or Narensii or Narensioi (Ancient Greek: Ναρήνσιοι) or Naresioi or Naresii (Ancient Greek: Ναρήσιοι) was the name of a newly formed Illyrian tribe from various peoples living around the River Naron or Neretva, mostly in its lower course. The Narensi had 102 decuriae.

=== Parthini ===
The Parthini lived in southern Illyria.

=== Penestae ===
Penestae (Ancient Greek: Πενέσται) was the name of an Illyrian tribe. Their chief town was Uscana.

=== Selepitani ===
The Selepitani (Latin: Selepitani) were an Illyrian tribe located below the Lake Scutari.

=== Siculotae ===
The Siculotae or Sikoulotai were an Illyrian tribe. The Siculotae were part of the Pirustae. The Siculotae had 24 decuriae.

=== Dalmatae ===
The Dalmatae were an ancient Illyrian tribe. It is considered to be connected to the Albanian dele and its variants which include the Gheg form delmë, meaning "sheep", and to the Albanian term delmer, "shepherd". They were later Celticized. The Delmatae had 342 decuriae.

=== Iapydes ===
The Iapydes or Japodes (Ancient Greek: Ἰάποδες, romanized: Iapodes) were an ancient people who dwelt north of and inland from the Liburnians, off the Adriatic coast and eastwards of the Istrian peninsula. The first written mention of an Illyrian tribe known as "Iapydes" is by Hecataeus of Miletus.

=== Baridustae ===
The Baridustae were an Illyrian tribe that was later settled in Dacia along with Pirustae and Sardeates. The Baridustae were a Dalmatian tribe.

=== Tariotes ===
The Tariotes were a subtribe of the Dalmatae that lived on the eastern Adriatic coast.

=== Sardiatae ===
The Sardiatae or Sardiotai were an Illyrian tribe close to Jajce. Sardeates were later settled in Dacia. The Sardeates had 52 decuriae.

=== Docleatae ===
The Docleatae (Ancient Greek: Δοκλεᾶται, romanized: Dokleatai) were an Illyrian tribe that lived in what is now Montenegro. Their capital was Doclea (or Dioclea), and they are called after the town. They had settled west of the Morača river, up to Montenegro's present-day borders with Bosnia and Herzegovina. The Docleatae were prominent for their cheese, which was exported to various Roman provinces within the Roman Empire. They were composed of parts of the Taulantii, the Pleraei or Pyraei, Endirudini, Sasaei, Grabaei, Labeatae that came together after the Great Illyrian revolt. The Docleatae had 33 decuriae.

=== Pleraei ===
Pleraei, Plarioi, Pyraei, Pleraioi, Plaraioi or Palarioi (Ancient Greek: Παλάριοι) was the name of an Illyrian tribe.

=== Endirudini ===
Endirudini or Interphrourinoi (Ancient Greek: Ἰντερφρουρῖνοι) was the name of an Illyrian tribe that became part of the Docleatae.

=== Sasaei ===
Sasaei was the name of an Illyrian tribe that became part of the Docleatae.

=== Grabaei ===
The Grabaei or Kambaioi (Ancient Greek: Καμβαῖοι) were a minor Illyrian group that lived around Lake Scutari.

=== Deraemestae ===
Deraemestae or Deraemistae was the name of an Illyrian tribe. The Deraemestae were composed of parts of several other tribes such as the Ozuaei, Taulantii, Partheni, Hemasini, Arthitae and Armistae. The Deramestae had 30 decuriae.

=== Ozuaei ===
Ozuaei or Ozuaioi or Oxuaioi (Ancient Greek: Ὀξυαῖοι) was the name of one of the tribes comprising the Deramestae.

=== Hemasini ===
Hemasini or Hippasinoi (Ancient Greek: Ἱππασῖνοι) was the name of one of the tribes comprising the Deramestae.

=== Arthitae ===
Arthitae was the name of one of the tribes comprising the Deramestae.

=== Armistae ===
Armistae was the name of one of the tribes comprising the Deramestae.

=== Taulantii ===
Taulantii (Ancient Greek: Ταυλάντιοι) was the name of a cluster of Illyrian tribes. The term taulantii is connected with the Albanian word dallëndyshe, or tallandushe, meaning 'swallow'. The ethnonym Chelidonioi also reported by Hecateus as the name of a tribe neighboring the Taulantii is the translation of the name Taulantii as khelīdṓn (χελιδών) means "swallow" in Ancient Greek. According to Greek mythology Taulas (Tαύλας), one of the six sons of Illyrius, was the eponymous ancestor of the Taulantii. The Taulantii dominated at various times much of the plain between the rivers Drin (Drilon) and Vjosa (Aoös). Their central area was the hinterland of Epidamnos-Dyrrhachion, corresponding to present-day Tirana and the region between the valleys of Mat and Shkumbin (Genusus). This tribe played an important role in the Illyrian history of the 4th–3rd centuries BCE, when King Glaukias (ruled 335 – c. 302 BCE) ruled over them. Glaukias offered asylum to the infant Pyrrhus of Epirus and maintained ties with him after he became king of Epirus. The Abroi, a northern subgroup of the Taulantii, were known to the ancient Greek writers for their technique of preparing mead from honey.

==== Chelidonioi ====
The Chelidonioi lived in southern Illyria.

==== Abroi ====
The Abroi lived in southern Illyria.

=== Pannonian tribes ===
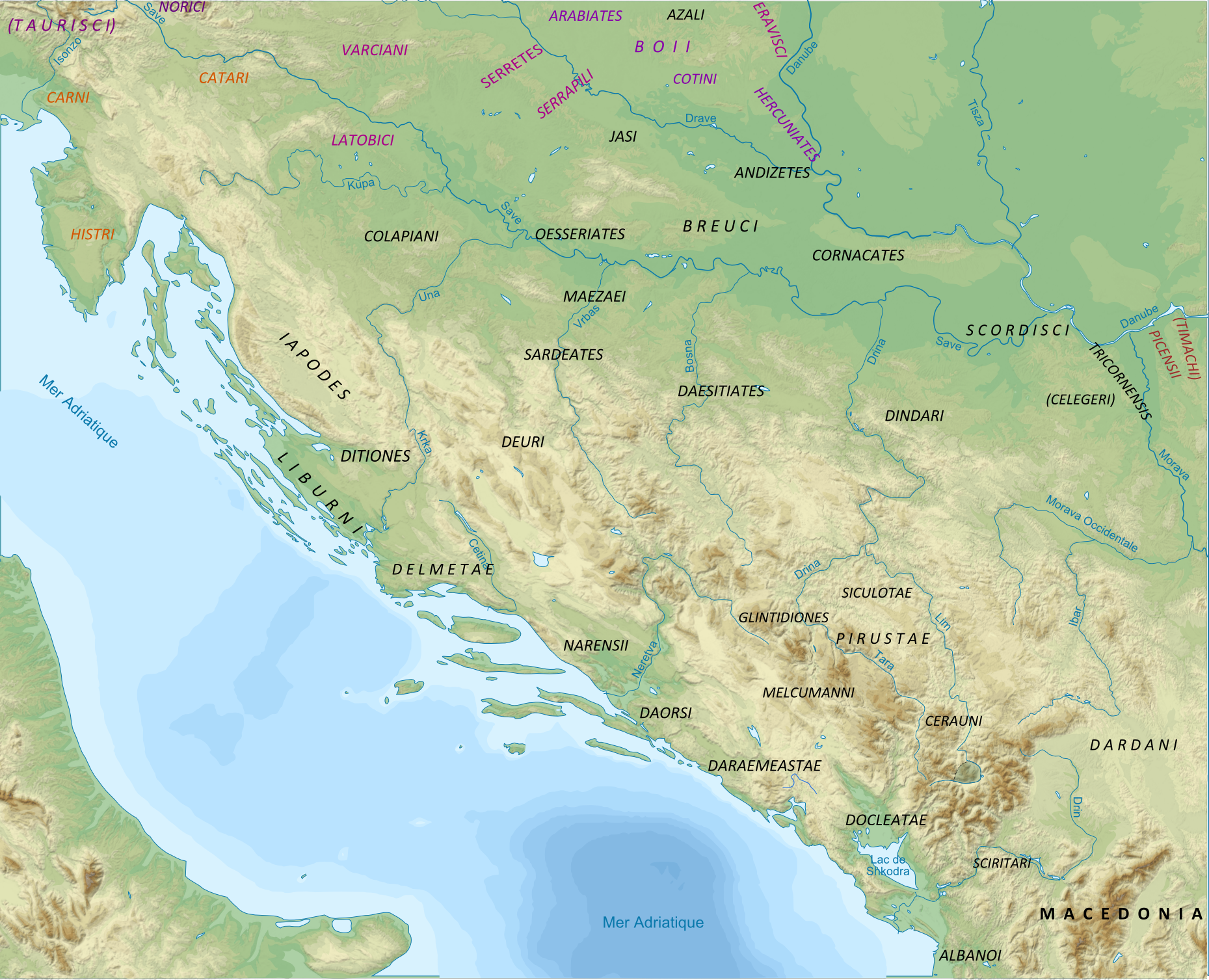
Dalmatians, Liburni, Venetic groups, Pannonian groups and Celts in Pannonia

The name Pannonians (Ancient Greek: Παννόνιοι, romanized: Pannonii) refers to Illyrian tribes, who originally inhabited the southern part of what was later known as Roman province of Pannonia, south of the river Drava (Dravus), and the northern part of the future Roman province of Dalmatia. In the Roman era, Pannonians settled in Dacia, the northern Pannonian plain and the eastern Alps. Some Pannonian tribes appear to have been Celticized.

Julius Pokorny believed the name Pannonia is derived from Illyrian, from the Proto-Indo-European root *pen-, "swamp, water, wet" (cf. English fen, "marsh"; Hindi pani, "water").

The Pannonian tribes inhabited the area between the river Drava and the Dalmatian coast. Early archaeology and onomastics show that they were culturally different from southern Illyrians, Iapodes, and the La Tène peoples commonly known as the Celts, though they were later Celticized. However, there are some cultural similarities between the Pannonians and Dalmatians. Many of the Pannonians lived in areas with rich iron ore deposits, so iron mining and production was an important part of their economy before and after the Roman conquest. Apart from Segestica, the Pannonians did not have settlements of importance in pre-Roman times that were actually Celtic. Ancient sources (Strabo, Pliny the Elder, Appian of Alexandria) mention a few of the Pannonian tribes by name, and historians and archaeologists have located some of them.

The Pannonians were not definitely subdued within the province of Illyricum until the Great Illyrian Revolt, which started in 6 AD when the Pannonians, together with the Dalmatians and other Illyrian tribes, revolted, and engaged the Roman Empire in a hard-fought campaign that lasted for three years, when they were finally overcome by the future emperor Tiberius and Germanicus in 9 AD. At that point, the province of Illyricum was dissolved, and its lands were divided between the new provinces of Pannonia in the north and Dalmatia in the south.

==== Amantini ====
Amantini (Ancient Greek: Ἄμαντες) was the name of a Pannonian Illyrian tribe. They greatly resisted the Romans but were sold as slaves after their defeat. The Amantini were close to Sirmium.

==== Breuci ====
The Breuci (Ancient Greek: Βρεῦκοι, romanized: Breukoi) were a Pannonian Illyrian tribe. They greatly resisted the Romans and some were sold as slaves after their defeat. They received Roman citizenship during Trajan's rule. It is likely that the name of the northern Bosnian city Brčko is derived from the name of this tribe. A number of Breuci settled in Dacia.

Bato the Breucian of the Breuci tribe and Pinnes from Pannonia were among the leaders of the Great Illyrian Revolt, together with Bato the Daesitiate of the Daesitiates from Province of Dalmatia (modern-day Central Bosnia).

==== Colapiani ====
Colapiani was the name of an Illyrian tribe. The Colapiani were created from the Pannonian Breuci along with the Osseriates and the Celtic Varciani. They lived in the central and southern White Carniola, along the Kupa river, and were mentioned by Pliny the Elder and Ptolemy. The archeologists Jaro Šašel and Dragan Božič have attributed the Vinica material culture to Colapiani, but opinions are divided.

==== Daesitiates ====
The Daesitiates were an Illyrian tribe that lived in what is today Central Bosnia in Bosnia and Herzegovina during the time of the Roman Republic. Along with the Maezaei, the Daesitiates were part of the western group of Pannonians in Roman Dalmatia. They were prominent from the end of the 4th century BCE up until the beginning of the 3rd century CE. Evidence of their daily activities can be found in literary sources, as well as in the rich material finds that belong to the Central Bosnian cultural group. After nearly three centuries of political independence, the Daesitiates (and their polity) were conquered by Roman Emperor Augustus. Afterwards, the Daesitiates were incorporated into the province of Illyricum with a low total of 103 decuriae.

==== Pirustae ====
The Pirustae or Pyrissaei (Ancient Greek: Πειροῦσται or Πυρισσαῖοι) were a Pannonian Illyrian tribe that lived in modern Montenegro. According to some sources, they had also lived in territories outside of modern-day Montenegro, but the majority of archaeologists, including the famous British archaeologist Sir Arthur Evans, say that the Pirustae had lived in northern Montenegro, around present-day Pljevlja and that they were prominent miners. Their prominence in mining has been seen in epigraphic monuments from Dacia's mining regions. Pirustae along with other Pannonians and Illyrians like the Sardeates were later settled in Dacia (modern-day Romania).

==== Scirtari ====
The Scirtari or Scirtones were an Illyrian tribe. The Scirtari were part of the Pirustae. The Scirtari had 72 decuriae.

==== Glintidiones ====
The Glintidiones (Ancient Greek: Γλιντιδίωνες) were an Illyrian tribe. The Glintidiones may have been part of the Pirustae. The Glintidiones had 44 decuriae.

==== Ceraunii ====
Ceraunii (Ancient Greek: Κεραύνιοι, romanized: Keraunioi) was the name of an Illyrian tribe that lived close to the Pirustae in modern Montenegro. The Ceraunii were part of the Pirustae. They had 24 decuriae. Their name seems to derive from the Greek word for 'thunderbolt'.

==== Segestani ====
The Segestani (Ancient Greek: Σεγεστανοί, romanized: Segestanoi) were a Pannonian Illyrian tribe who inhabited the area around Segestica, later known as Siscia (modern-day Sisak in Croatia).

In the 2nd century BCE, the Segestani were attacked without lasting success by consuls Lucius Aurelius Cotta and an unidentified Cornelius.

In 35 BCE, the Segestani were attacked by Augustus, who conquered and occupied Siscia.

==== Maezaei ====
Maezaei or Maizaioi or Mazaioi (Ancient Greek: Μαζαῖοι) were a Pannonian Illyrian tribe. The Maezaei had 269 decuriae.

==== Andizetes ====
The Andizetes, also referred to as Andisetes (Ancient Greek: Ἀνδιζήτιοι), were a small Pannonian tribe that lived in the territory of present-day Bosnia and Herzegovina. Not much is known about this tribe except that it is found on the list of Illyrian tribes that rose against the Roman Empire during the Great Illyrian Revolt. The personal name of 'Andes', a variant of the name 'Andis' popular among the Illyrians of southern Pannonia and much of northern Dalmatia (corresponding roughly with modern Bosnia and Herzegovina), may be derived from the name of this tribe. They started receiving Roman citizenship during Trajan's rule. The Andizetes are the earliest known inhabitants of Mursa (modern-day Croatian city of Osijek), which would be captured by the Celtic Scordisci around 350 BC.

==== Azali ====
The Azali (Ancient Greek: Ἄζαλοι) were a tribe that inhabited Brigetio (now Szőny) in Noricum, transported there during the Roman conquest from southern Pannonia. They had been deported after the 6–9 AD rebellion. They, along with the Eravisci, inhabited the Fejér County during the Marcomannic Wars (166–180). The civitas azaliorum included the Brigetio legionary fortress and surrounding settlements.

==== Ditiones ====
The Ditiones (Ancient Greek: Διτίωνες) were a Pannonian Illyrian tribe. The Ditiones had 239 decuriae.

==== Jasi ====
Jasi was the name of a Pannonian Illyrian tribe.

==== Osseriates ====
The Osseriates (also Oseriates), along with the Celtic Varciani and the Colapiani, were created from the Pannonian Breuci.

=== Illyrii proprie dicti ===
Illyrii proprie dicti were the Illyrians proper, so called by Pliny (23–79 CE) in his Natural History. They later formed the Docleatae. They were the Taulantii, the Pleraei or Pyraei, the Endirudini, Sasaei, Grabaei, Labeatae. Illyrians proper were also some of the native communities of Roman Dalmatia.

== Atintanii ==
Atintanii or Atintani or Atintanians were a tribe in Illyria, north of Via Egnatia. Appian (95–165 CE) mentions them close to Epidamnus. During the Illyrian Wars, the Atintani went over to the Romans and, according to Appian, Demetrius of Pharos tried to detach them from Roman authority. The Atintani seem to have originated from the obscure, perhaps Thracian Tynteni, only attested in coins. The Atintani were ruled by the Thracian dynasty of the Peresadyes.

== Greek ==
- See Greek colonies in Illyria

== Liburnians ==
In the early historical sources from the 8th century BCE, the Liburnians were recorded by name or as separate ethnic groups; and as early as the 6th century BCE, Hecateus noted that the Liburnians were also composed of Caulici, Mentores, Syopii and Hythmitae, probably narrow tribal communities. Later, in the 3rd century BCE, Callimachus mentioned Mentores, Hymanes, Enchealae and Peucetias as those who once had been a part of them, Ismeni were also recorded as one of their communities.

- Lopsi

== Iapygians/Messapians ==
Iapygians and Messapians did not dwell in Illyria, but in the heel of southern Italy. They could have had Illyrian origins or some sort of link with Illyria.

- Messapii
- Dauni
- Peucetii linked to the Liburnian Peucetias
- Iapyges linked to the Iapodes, who were sometimes also called Iapyges

== Adriatic Veneti ==
- Histri
- Catari
- Secusses

== See also ==
- List of ancient Celtic peoples and tribes
- List of ancient cities in Thrace and Dacia
- List of ancient tribes in Thrace and Dacia
- List of Illyrian peoples and tribes
- List of Illyrians
- List of kings of Thrace and Dacia
- List of settlements in Illyria

== Sources ==
- Wilkes, John J. (1992). The Illyrians. Wiley.
