= Peresadyes =

Ancient tribe in southeast Illyria

The Peresadyes (Ancient Greek: Περεσάδυες) were an ancient tribe that lived in southeast Illyria.

Some historians have suggested that they were a part of either the Enchelei, the Taulantii, or the Dardani. According to others their name is very close to that of the royal name Berisades in Thrace (in Ancient Greek: Bηρισάδης), which would suggest a possible Thracian origin.

In ancient literature they are recorded only by Strabo, who reported what most likely Hecataeus wrote about them, saying that they joined the dynasty of the Enchelei, also called Sessarethii.

== See also ==
- List of ancient tribes in Illyria
