= Caravantius =

Illyrian mercenary

Caravantius, an Illyrian, was half brother to Gentius, the last Illyrian king of the Ardiaean State. In 168 BC he fought with his brother against the Cavii.

== Bibliography ==
- The Illyrians by J. J. Wilkes, 1992 ISBN 0-631-19807-5
