= Mazaei =

Ancient Illyrian tribe

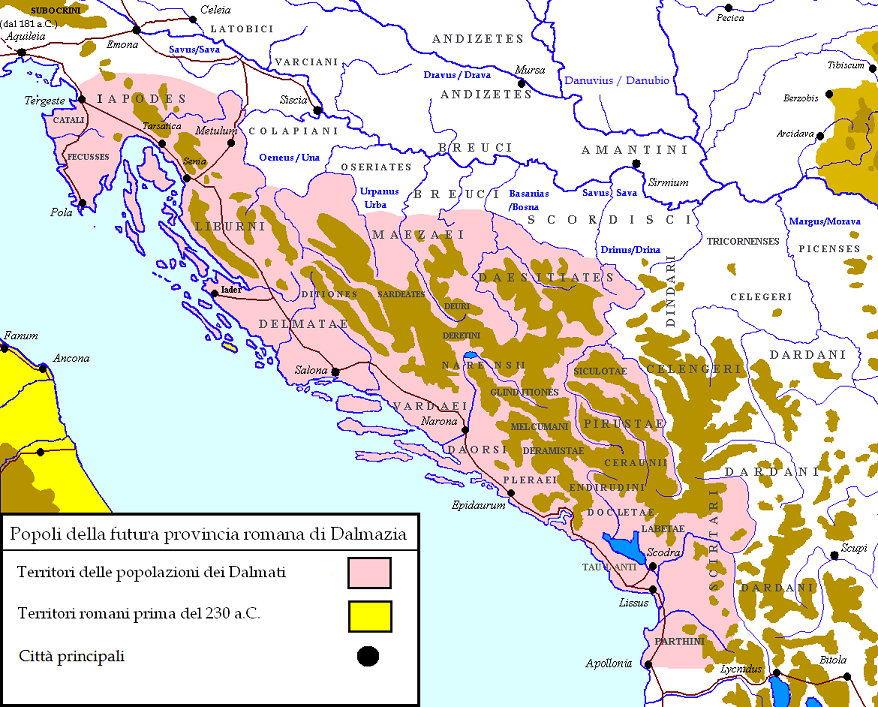
Illyrian tribes area, with the signed MAEZAEI

Mazaei or Maezaei (Ancient Greek: Μαζαῖοι/Μαιζαῖοι) were a sub-tribe of the Illyrians, autochthonous to the interior of today's Bosnia and Herzegovina, settled mainly in the Sana river basin, the middle course of Vrbas, and around the Vrbanja and Ugar rivers.

== Overview ==
Mazaei were a sub-tribe of the Illyrians, settled in what later became Roman province, the Pannonia. They settled in the Sana river basin, the middle course of Vrbas, and around the Vrbanja and Ugar rivers, and were bordered on the east by the Dardans, on the west by Iapodes, the Una river, Krka waterfalls, and Iasis, on the north by Sava – Drava – Danube, and on the south by Liburni, Delmatae, and Breuci on the north-east.

Like other Illyrians, Mazaei lived in fortified or semi-fortified settlements, subsisting on agriculture, hunting and fishing, and craftsmanship. Ancient writers like Herodian, Livy, Pliny, Strabo, Theophrastus and others described the Illyrians as tall, strong warriors, and heavy drinkers. And they lived in patriarchal communities. Every eight years they divided their lands according to each other's struggles and resistance to the enemy. Mazaei had 269 judges.

In 10 AD Roman administrators divided the province of Illyricum into the new provinces: Pannonia in the north and Dalmatia in the south. The term Illyria remained in use in Late Latin and throughout the medieval period.

== See also ==
- List of ancient tribes in Illyria
