= Osseriates =

Illyrian people

The Osseriates (also Oseriates) were an Illyrian tribe in Pannonia. The Osseriates along with the Celtic Varciani and the Colapiani were created from the Breuci.

== See also ==
- List of ancient tribes in Illyria
