= Baridustae =

Illyrian people

The Baridustae were an Illyrian tribe that lived in Dalmatia, around Bariduum, a settlement located between Salona and Servitium, more precisely 30 miles north of Salona, which has been identified with the site area of Livno, in present-day Bosnia and Herzegovina. They are attested only in epigraphic material.

The Baridustae are documented, along with other Illyrian tribes like the Pirustae and Sardiatae, in the epigraphic material of Alburnus Maior in Roman Dacia, a mining town where several Illyrian peoples moved by the time of Roman emperor Trajan. A great number of inscriptions were recently found reporting the tribal name of the Baridustae, which were produced after they moved to the new town in Dacia from their ancient tribal areas in Dalmatia. A k(astellum) Baridust(arum) is also attested in Alburnus Maior; its inhabitants formed a collegium. The existence of collegia of the Baridustae and of the Sardiatae certainly suggests a location of those communities within or near the mining district.

== Bibliography ==
- Hirt, Alfred Michael (2010). Imperial Mines and Quarries in the Roman World: Organizational Aspects 27 BC-AD 235. Oxford: Oxford University Press. ISBN 978-0-19-957287-8.
- Hirt, Alfred (2019). "Dalmatians and Dacians—Forms of Belonging and Displacement in the Roman Empire". Humanities. 8 (1). MDPI: 1–25. doi:10.3390/h8010001.
- Nemeti, Sorin (2004). "Bindus-Neptunus and Ianus Geminus at Alburnus Maior (Dacia)". Studia Historica. Historia Antigua. 22. Ediciones Universidad de Salamanca: 91–101. ISSN 0213-2052.
- Nemeti, Irina; Nemeti, Sorin (2010). "The Barbarians Within. Illyrian Colonists in Roman Dacia". Studia Historica. Historia Antigua. 28. Ediciones Universidad de Salamanca: 109–133. ISSN 0213-2052.
- Piso, Ioan (2004). "Gli Illiri ad Alburnus Maior". In Urso, Gianpaolo (ed.). Dall'Adriatico al Danubio: l'Illirico nell'età greca e romana : atti del convegno internazionale, Cividale del Friuli, 25-27 settembre 2003. I convegni della Fondazione Niccolò Canussio (in Italian). ETS. pp. 271–308. ISBN 884671069X.
