= Varciani =

Ancient people of Pannonia

The Varciani were an ancient people of southern Pannonia, settled in the upper valley of the Sava around Andautonia (Ščitarjevo, near Zagreb in present-day Croatia). They are recorded only in the Roman period, by Pliny, Ptolemy and Latin inscriptions of the 1st and 2nd centuries AD. The personal names of their members are Celtic, and they are generally regarded as a Celtic or strongly Celticised community, although it is disputed whether they formed a people before the Roman conquest or emerged as a civitas organised by Rome. Their tribal centre was raised to the rank of a Flavian municipium as Andautonia.

== Name ==
The Varciani are listed among the principal peoples (populorum capita) of Pannonia by Pliny, and placed by Ptolemy in the south of Upper Pannonia, east of the Latobici. The ethnic Varcianus recurs in inscriptions, including those of the cavalryman Vercaius, son of Medius (domo Varcianus), of Iantumarus, son of Andedunis (Varcianus), and of an eques singularis Augusti described as natione Varcianus.

András Mócsy derived the name from a place called Varceia, otherwise recorded but impossible to locate, and counted the Varciani among the communities of the Sava valley whose names are formed from geographic terms, which he took as a sign that they were administrative groups organised by Rome rather than inherited tribes. Péter Kovács likewise lists the name among these geographically derived formations, though with reservation.

The personal names borne by attested Varciani are Celtic. On the strength of the onomastics, Ivan Radman-Livaja and Hana Ivezić class the Varciani as a Celtic people, one of the few communities of southern Pannonia for which the surviving names point to a clear dominant tradition.

== Geography ==
The Varciani held the upper valley of the Sava above Siscia (modern Sisak), with their tribal centre at Andautonia, on the site of Ščitarjevo near Zagreb. Their western neighbours were the Celtic Latobici. To the south, in the valley of the Kupa (the ancient Colapis), lay the Colapiani, and the territory of the Varciani bordered that of Siscia. Alka Domić Kunić places the Iasi along their northern and eastern side and extends the land of the Varciani to the southern slopes of the Žumberak and Medvednica ranges.

== History ==
Before the Roman conquest the upper Sava valley lay within the sphere of the Celtic Taurisci, who were predominant over several Pannonian communities of the region. Whether the Varciani already formed a distinct group at this date is uncertain: on one view they, the Latobici and other neighbouring communities belonged to a wider Tauriscan territory that Rome later broke up into smaller units. Alka Domić Kunić has suggested that the Varciani, as the Sava-valley people then dependent on the Taurisci, may already have been reached by the campaign of the consul Tuditanus in 129 BC.

Pannonia was conquered between 12 BC and AD 9. After the suppression of the great Pannonian–Dalmatian revolt of AD 6–9, the larger native groupings of the Sava and Drava valleys were broken up into smaller civitates, a number of which, the Varciani among them, are first recorded only in the imperial period. In the same years auxiliary units were levied from the pacified communities of the upper Sava, including the cohortes Latobicorum and Varcianorum.

The civitas of the Varciani is attested through the 1st century AD, and its centre, Andautonia, was raised to municipal rank under the Flavians, enrolled in the tribus Quirina. Soldiers continued to identify themselves as Varciani into the 2nd century. A detachment styling itself cives Sisciani et Varciani et Latobici set up a dedication in Samaria, probably during the Jewish revolt under Hadrian, (Note: Mócsy connected the same inscription with a vexillation serving in Syria under Trajan.) and the cohors II Varcianorum equitata served abroad, its veterans returning home on discharge.
