= Tariotes =

Illyrian people

The Tariotes or Tariotae were an Illyrian tribe that lived on the Adriatic coast of Dalmatia, in modern-day Croatia. They are considered part of the Dalmatae. The Tariotes are mentioned in the Classical literature by Roman author Pliny the Elder alone. In Pliny's Natural History the territory of the Tariotes is called Tariota and is mentioned as an ancient region (Tariotarum antiqua regio), while their city is called Tariona, and described as a castellum, i.e. a stronghold. Tariona was located between the Krka River in the north and Cape Ploča in the south, along the coastal area. Tariote territory is also testified by two boundary inscriptions dating back to Roman Imperial times, which were found in the area of Marina. Those inscriptions refer to the boundaries of pastures used by the tribe of the Tariotes. A passage in the Libri Coloniarum ("Book of Colonies") of the Gromatici Veteres, probably dating back to the 5th century AD, is also considered to report the name of the tribe, along with that of the Sardeates.

== Geography ==
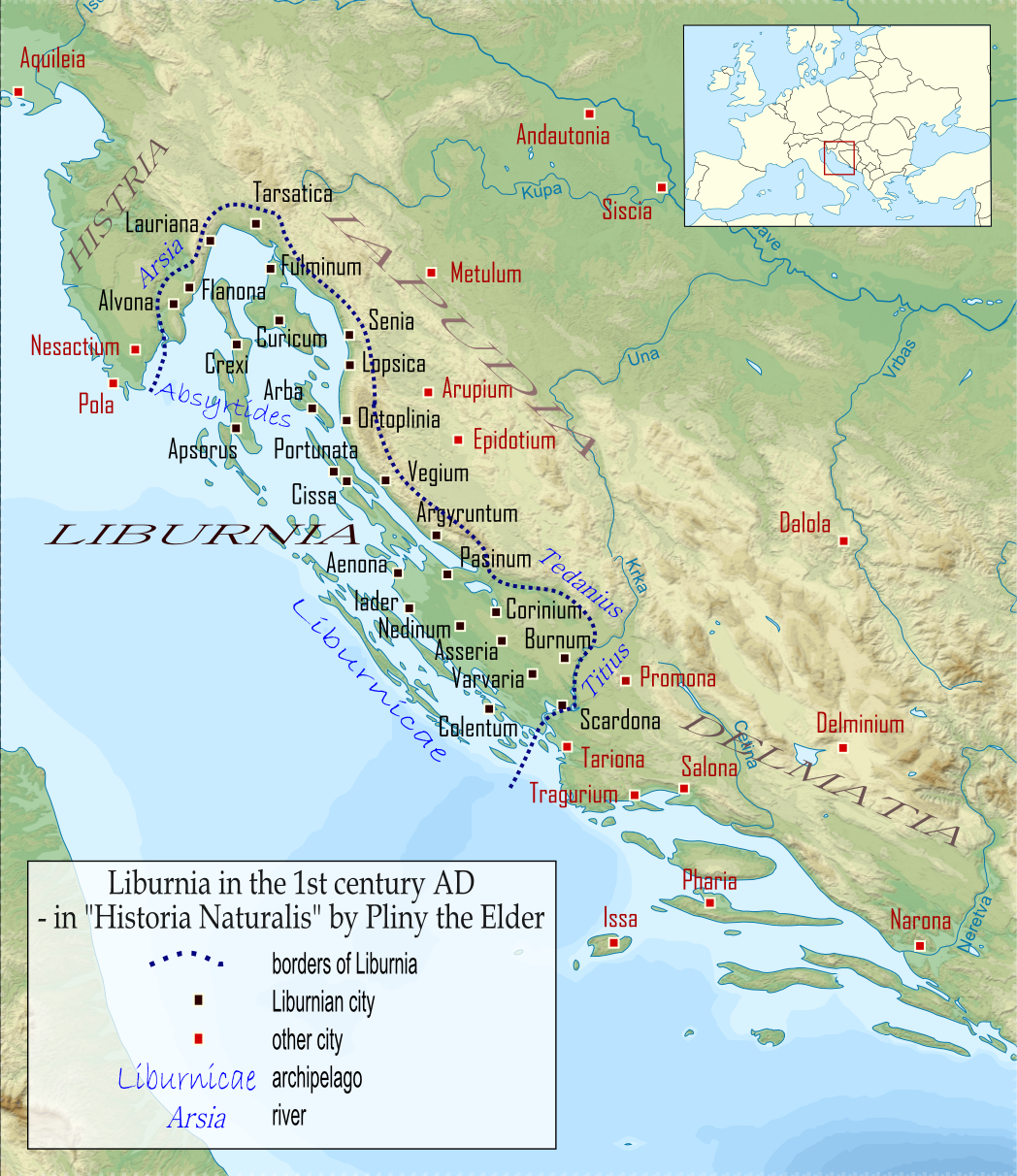
The territory of the Tariotes, which was called Tariota in classical antiquity, was located in the coastal area of Dalmatia, directly to the south of Liburnian territory.

The Tariotes inhabited Tariota, a region that began after Liburnian Scardona (Skradin), spreading directly to the south of Liburnia. Tariotan border ran roughly through the middle of the peninsula which Roman sources called Hyllus. This westernmost promontory of the ancient Dalmatian coast lies between Morinje Bay (near Šibenik) in the north-west and Kaštela Bay in the south-east, sheltered in its hinterland by the hills.

Numerous hillforts and their tumuli were found in the Hyllus Peninsula, and most of it were more intensely settled from the end of the second to the middle of the first millennium BC, while evidences point to the settlement of the peninsula during the Late Bronze Age and the Early Iron Age. From north to the south of the peninsula large fortified settlements (modern: Grad, Domazeti, Kosmač, Drid and Oriovščak) dominate over a short length, surrounded with a series of smaller hillforts placed on more prominent elevations, and fortified with dry-stone ramparts, all visually connected. They were usually raised to control maritime and overland communications, and to enable also the control over individual pastures, as indicated by their spatial distribution, same as the neighboring Liburnian hillforts.

== Economy ==
The economy of the Tariotes, like that of other similar coastal Delmatae tribal communities, was mainly based on livestock husbandry, which was suitable for the hillfort lifestyle that would last even after the beginning of Roman domination in Dalmatia. Historical circumstances and therefore the role of the hillforts changed with the arrival of the Romans in Dalmatia. They were no longer defensive fortifications from the attacks of hostile local tribes, nor strongholds to resist the Roman army. In that time Rome intervened in the disputes between local tribes and these hillforts lost their military role, although they retained their economical role primary as sites for livestock safeguarding.

Unlike the Liburnian settlements, the hillfort centres in the old territory of the Tariotes would not continue to exist throughout Antiquity. In Liburnia, centres such as Nedinium (Nadin), Asseria (Podgrađe, near Benkovac), Iader (Zadar) continued to exist in Roman times, and the Liburnians retained their ethnic distinct character under Rome, while the same did not take place on the neighbouring Hyllus Peninsula. However, individual Tariote hillforts lived on during the 1st century AD, and a lot of Roman materials were found in them, mostly vessels that indicate intense trade between the indigenous Tariotes and the newly arrived Romans who settled in Pretorium (Grebaštica), Marina and Tragurium (Trogir). Even though Tariote hillforts experienced architectural innovations during the 1st centuries BC and AD, they retained mainly an economic role already during the 2nd century AD, as the pax Romana rendered strongholds superficial. In that time life gradually became oriented toward Pretorium and other Roman centres, while the hillforts would be used as shelters for the livestock and people against predators. Even today some of them serve this function.

== See also ==
- List of ancient Illyrian peoples and tribes

== Bibliography ==
- Brunet, Claude; Conso, Danièle; Gonzales, Antonio; Guard, Thomas; Guillaumin, Jean-Yves; Sensal, Catherine (2008). "Libri Coloniarum (Livre des Colonies)" [Book of Colonies]. Corpus Agrimensorum Romanorum. « ISTA », 1102. VII. Besançon: Institut des Sciences et Techniques de l'Antiquité: 5–116. doi:10.3406/ista.2008.2896. ISBN 9782848672298.
- Catani, Lorenzo (2008). "Arheološko-povijesne bilješke o Castellum Tariona u rimsko doba" [Archaeological and historical notes on the Castellum Tariona in the Roman Era]. Vjesnik Za Arheologiju I Povijest Dalmatinsku (in Croatian and English). 101 (1). Split: 75–86.
- Miletić, Alen (2008a). "Saltus Tariotarum". Opvscvla Archaeologica (in Croatian and English). 32 (1): 7–20.
- Miletić, Alen (2008b). "Castellum Tariona" [The Castellum Tariona]. Vjesnik Za Arheologiju I Povijest Dalmatinsku (in Croatian and English). 101 (1). Split: 59–74.
