= Siculotae =

Ancient Illyrian people

The Siculotae (also Sikoulotai) were an Illyrian people in antiquity.

The name of the Siculotae is related to the name of the Sicels, a pre-Roman people of Sicily. The toponym Sicily derives from their name. The Sicels themselves seem to have settled from the Balkans to Italy in the same trans-Adriatic movements of the LBA which created the Iapygian region in southern Italy. The toponym Shikjë (proposed older form: *Shikëlë) in northern Albania may preserve the name. The fort Siklai placed by Procopius in Macedonia was likely located in this area of Epirus Nova.

Pliny the Elder records a civitatum of the Siculotae with 24 decuriae among the indigenous Illyrian communities in the region of Narona. The civitatum of the Siculotae was created by the Roman after the Great Illyrian Revolt by breaking up larger Illyrian communities into smaller ones. Before the creation of the Roman civitatum, the Siculotae may have been part of the Delmatae and also the Pirustae, who lived further south. As such they may have been moved from Dalmatia to northern Montenegro around Plevlja with other Delmatae. Other communities which were part of the people known as Pirustae as far south as northern Macedonia were the Glintidiones and the Scirtari. A settlement named Siculi which has been identified with Bijaći (Resnik) near Trogir became a military colony in the Roman era. In the Tabula Peutingeriana, the settlement is mentioned as Siclis.

== Sources ==
- Baldi, Philip (2002). The foundations of Latin. Berlin: Mouton de Gruyter. ISBN 9783110807110.
- Dzino, Danijel (2010). Illyricum in Roman Politics, 229 BC-AD 68. Cambridge University Press. ISBN 978-0521194198.
- Kuzmanovska, Jasminka (20 December 2017). "Ranobizantska tvrđava Σικλαι: etimološka analiza toponima" [Early Byzantine fort Siklai: Etymological Analysis of the Toponym]. Miscellanea Hadriatica et Mediterranea. 4: 99–110. doi:10.15291/misc.1361.
- Wilkes, John (1962). "Studies in the roman province of Dalmatia" (PDF). Durham University.
- Wilkes, J. J. (8 February 1996). "The Danubian and Balkan provinces". In Bowman, A.; Champlin, E.; Lintott, A. (eds.). The Cambridge Ancient History. Vol. 10 The Augustan Empire, 43 BC-AD 69. Cambridge University Press. pp. 545–585. doi:10.1017/chol9780521264303.021. ISBN 9781139054386.
