= Bathiatae (tribe) =

Illyrian tribe

The Bathiatae (also Bathiatai) were an Illyrian people who possibly lived in modern Bosnia along the Bosna river.

They are mentioned by Appian in which he states "Octavian overcame the Oxyaei, the Perthoneatae, the Bathiatae, the Taulantii, the Cambaei, the Cinambri, the Meromenni, and the Pyrissaei, the Docleatae, the Carui, the Interphrurini, the Naresii, the Glintidiones, the Taurisci, the Hippasini and the Bessi".

They were located along today's modern Bosna River which was once known as Bathinus flumen and the river was named after them.

== See also ==
- Bato (Illyrian name)
