= Epicaria =

Former settlement in ancient Illyria

Epicaria (Ancient Greek: Ἐπικάρια) or Durnium was a settlement in ancient Illyria, of the Illyrian tribe called the Cavii. It was close to Bassania.

Distribution of cities in antiquity in the border of southern Illyria with Greeks and Thracians

== See also ==
- List of ancient cities in Illyria
