= Decury =

Roman term for a group of ten people

In Ancient Rome, a decury (Latin decuria, plural: decuriae) was a group of ten people, ranged under one chief, or commander, called a decurio.

In Roman cavalry a turma was divided into three decuries.

According to legend, Romulus divided the whole Roman people into three tribes, over each of which he appointed a tribune. Each tribe he subdivided into ten centuries, with centurions at their heads, and each century he subdivided further into ten decuries, over each of which a decurio commanded.

In the interregnum after the death of Romulus the Roman Senate, comprised at that time of 100 men, arranged itself into ten decuries, and each decuria governed Rome for five days. In a rotating manner, each man within a decuria reigned for 12 hours, six by day and six by night, as interrex. The decuriae continued to rotate the government amongst themselves for a year until the election and accession of Numa Pompilius.

Decuria was also a Roman unit of measurement applied to civitas of native peoples. (Note: Decuriae was a Roman term used by Elder Pliny in his Natural History completed in 70 AD based on official registers. Each civitas had a number of decuriae assigned to it as an indication of its size. A Roman division of native peoples.) It had been mentioned by Pliny the Elder at 70 AD in his work, Natural History.

== Etymology ==
From *dek- 'ten' plus *-ur-yo-, a Common Italic formation, judging from the related Umbrian dequrier, tekuries 'decurial'; and compare Oscan dekkviarim.
