= Cakran =

- Administrative unit
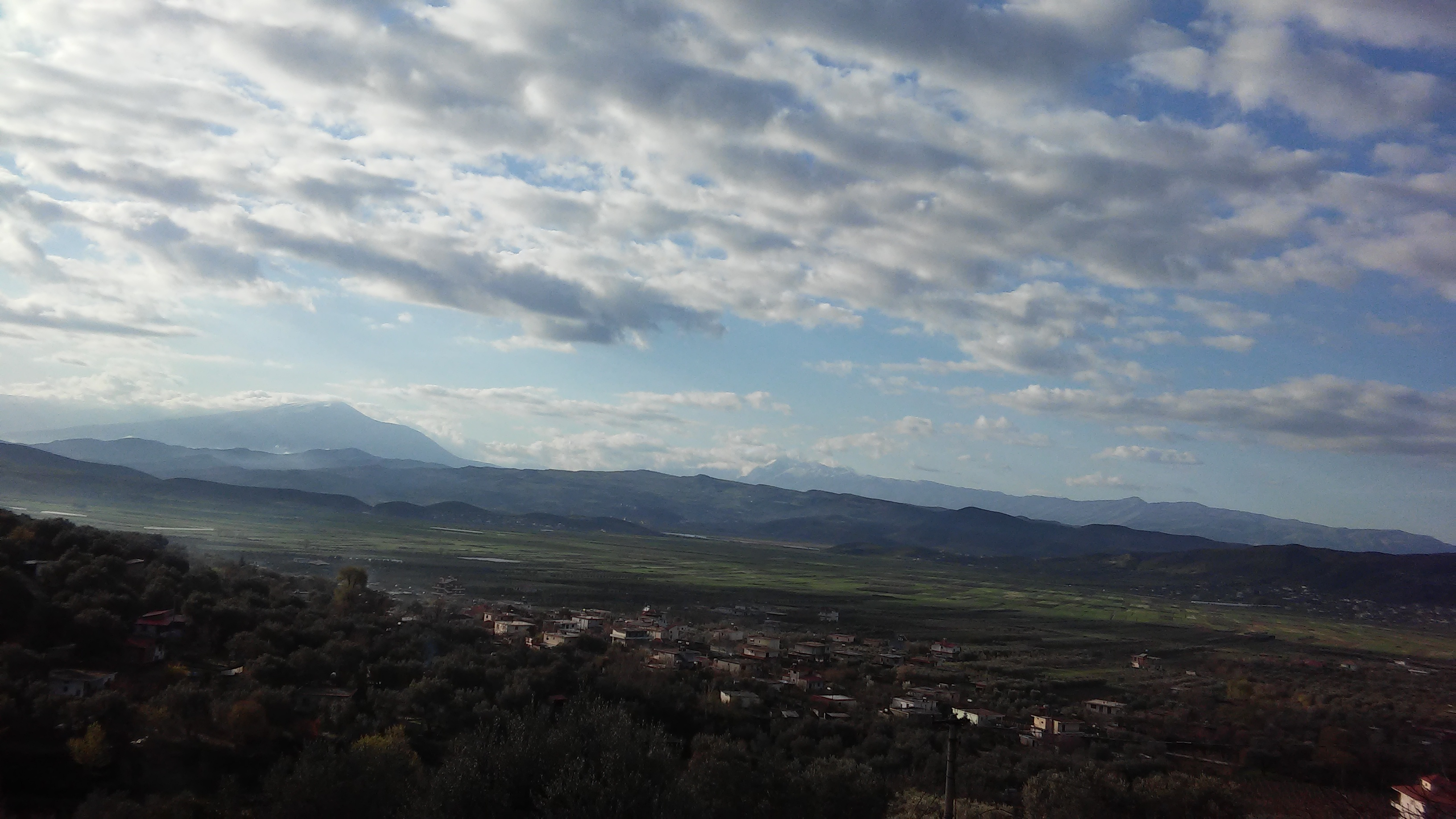
- The small village of Cakran in Fier

- Location within Albania
- Coordinates: 40°36′N 19°37′E
- Country: Albania
- County: Fier
- Municipality: Fier

Population (2011)
  - Administrative unit: 11,722
- Time zone: UTC+1 (CET)
  - Summer (DST): UTC+2 (CEST)

Cakran is a village and a former municipality in Fier County, southwestern Albania. At the 2015 local government reform it became a subdivision of the municipality Fier. The population at the 2011 census was 11,722.
