= Battle of the Volcaean Marshes =

7 CE battle in Illyria

- Part of the Illyrian revolt of 6–9 AD
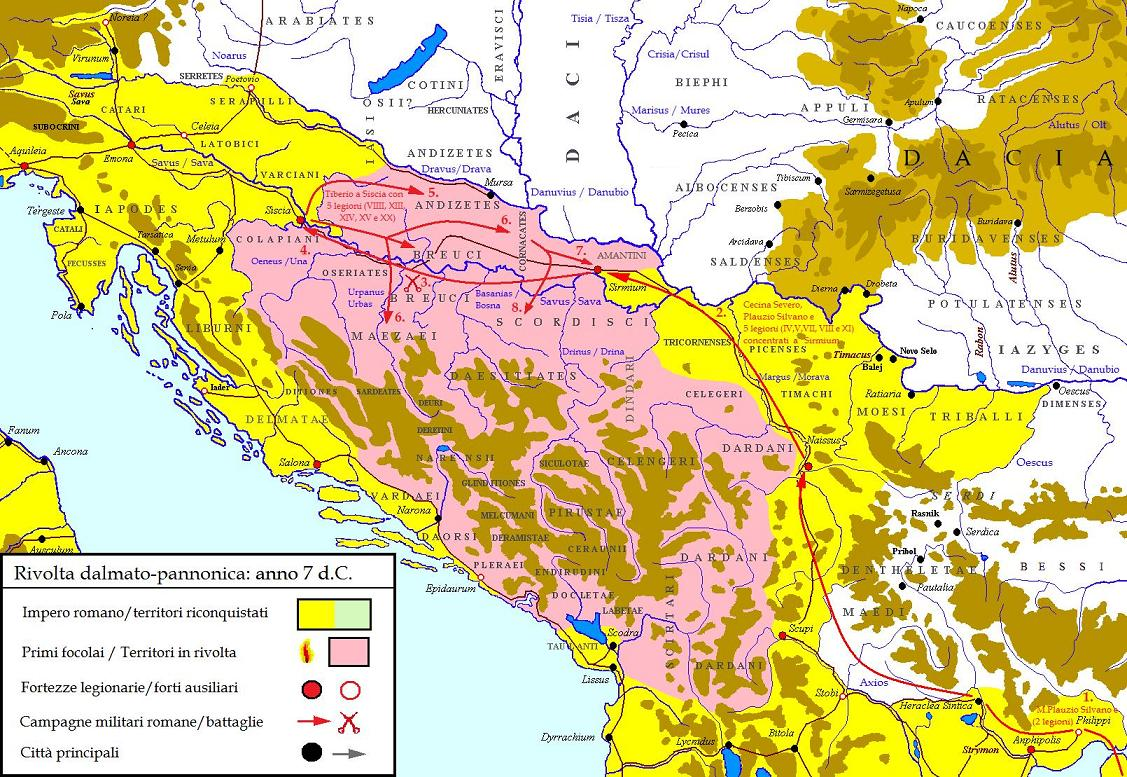
- The second year of the war: Tiberius concentrates his troops at Siscia (Sisak, Croatia, a roman colony), with as many as 10 legions, and began the Roman offensive.
Date	7 AD
Location	Volcaean Marshes, Illyricum (See section)
Result	Roman victory

Belligerents
Roman Empire; Odrysian Kingdom	Illyrian rebels

Commanders and leaders
Aulus Caecina Severus; Marcus Plautius Silvanus; Rhoemetalces I	Bato the Dalmatian; Bato the Breucian

Units involved
Legio VII Claudia; Legio VIII Augusta; Legio XI Claudia; Legio V Macedonica; Legio IIII Scythica; Thracian cavalry Classis Pannonica	Segestans (from Siscia); Pannonian infantry Breuci; Dalmatae; Daesitiates; Germanic cavalry contingent (led by Arminius)

Strength
Around 70 cohorts (est. 35,000 men)	20,000 men

Casualties and losses
Heavy	"Nearly fatal to all"

The Battle of the Volcaean Marshes took place in the year 7 AD as part of the Dalmatian-Pannonian revolt of 6–9 between the legions of the Roman army, led by Aulus Caecina Severus, and the Pannonian-Dalmatian rebel forces, led by Bato the Dalmatian and (possibly) Bato the Breucian.

== Ancient sources ==
Although the period of Augustus' principate is generally well documented, few sources deal with the events of the Illyrian revolt and even fewer speak about the years 7, 8 and 9 AD, with the exception of the conclusion of the war and the triumph of Tiberius, which occurred in conjunction with the clades Variana ("Varian defeat", Battle of the Teutoburg Forest).

The direct sources that report the events of the battle, although not very detailed, are two: Cassius Dio and Velleius Paterculus. The two versions give the same account of the clash but differ in some details:

- Velleius reports a battle but does not present its name (contrary to Cassius Dio), and states that only one of the two groups of rebels was actually present, while the other was barricaded on Mons Claudius, as well as attesting to the presence of Marcus Plautius Silvanus among the Roman ranks alongside Caecina;
- Cassius Dio states that both leaders of the Ribetti (Bato the Breucian and Bato the Dalmatian) were present but only mentions Caecina as commander of the Roman legions.

== Historical context ==
=== Background ===
By 5 AD, after the Immensum bellum broke out in Germany, the Romans were trying to reconquer lands before the Elbe river. Tiberius was busy preparing for the upcoming invasion of the Marcomannic kingdom of Maroboduus that would complete the conquest of Germany. According to Velleius, there was "nothing more to defeat in Germania than the people of the Marcomanni". However, due to the Pannonian uprising in 6 AD, this expedition was abandoned. The governor of Illyricum, Marcus Valerius Messalla Messallinus, planned to join the campaign with his own legions and requested the local population to send auxiliary troops to accompany the army. Once gathered, these troops rebelled against the Roman forces, under the command of an Illyrian warrior, Bato the Dalmatian, later joined by two members of the Pannoniam tribes, Pinnes and Bato the Breucian.

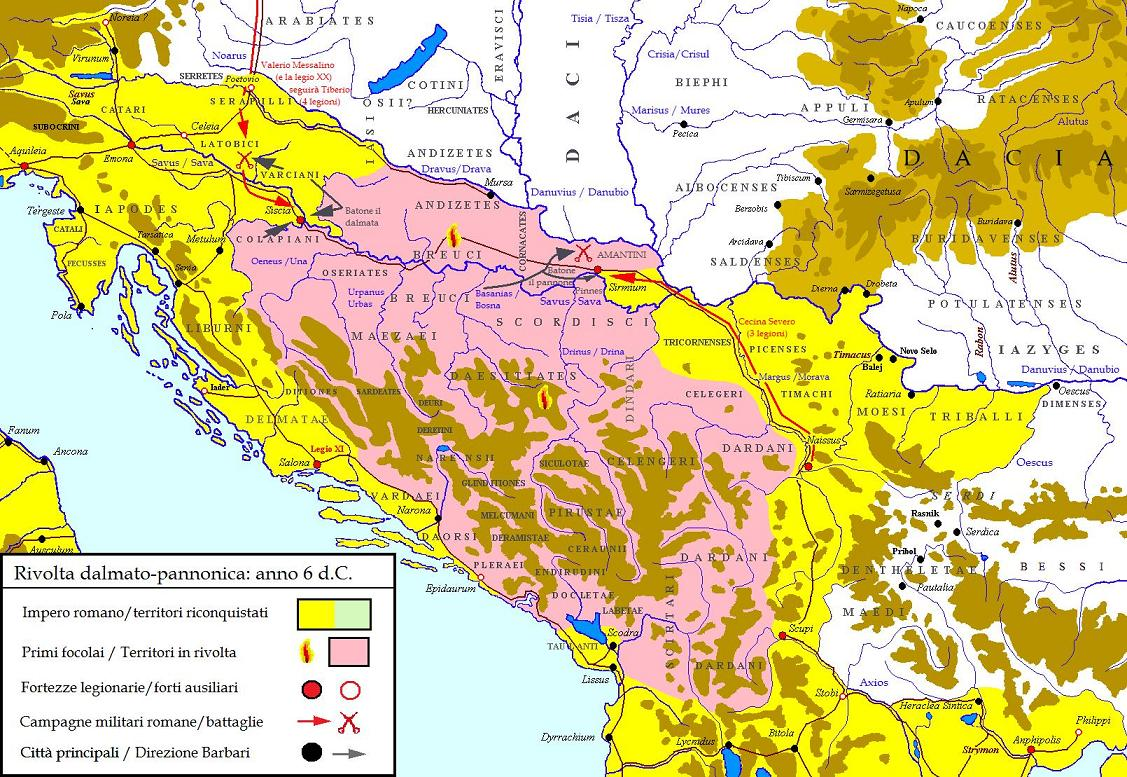
Illyrian Revolt, year 6 AD.

The revolt soon spread, until it involved the entire region of Illyricum. The alarming speed with which the rebels were increasing in number (up to a million rebels are thought) or around 209,000 rebels (according to Velleius), and their relative proximity to Rome greatly worried the emperor Augustus, who ordered that all available legions be diverted to quell the revolt. The troops were placed under the emperor's adopted son, Tiberius, later joined by Germanicus as legate. A large group of auxiliary troops, including a large contingent of Thracian cavalry, led by Rhoemetalces I of the Odrysian Kingdom, joined the imperial army. While Tiberius was descending with his legions from the north, Aulus Caecina Severus marched with his three legions (Legio VII Claudia, Legio VIII Augusta, Legio XI Claudia) from Moesia towards the fortress of Sirmium, a Roman stronghold under direct threat from the rebels, managing to block their advance with a victory near the Drava river, suffering considerable losses.

Having emptied Moesia of its legions, the Dacians and Sarmatians took advantage of the situation to carry out numerous raids, forcing Caecina to return early and leave the stronghold of Sirmium in the hands of Rhoemetalces.

=== Prelude ===
Tiberius' plan was as simple as it was effective: capture and hold the strongholds of Siscia (Sisak, Croatia) and Sirmium (Sremska Mitrovica, Serbia), take control of the territory between them (following the course of the Sava river), and separate the Dalmatian and Pannonian forces to defeat them separately, one at a time. Unfortunately, the two groups of rebels had already come into contact and had entrenched themselves on Mount Almus, which they managed to hold despite Rhoemetalces having defeated them in battle. The groups of rebels were not sufficiently disciplined to be able to defeat the Roman legions in the open field, but, together, with a clear numerical superiority, they could have faced the three legions of Moesia and destroyed them. However, with the ensuing battle, the rebels were defeated and forced to withdraw to mountain fortresses from which they launched raids whenever they could.

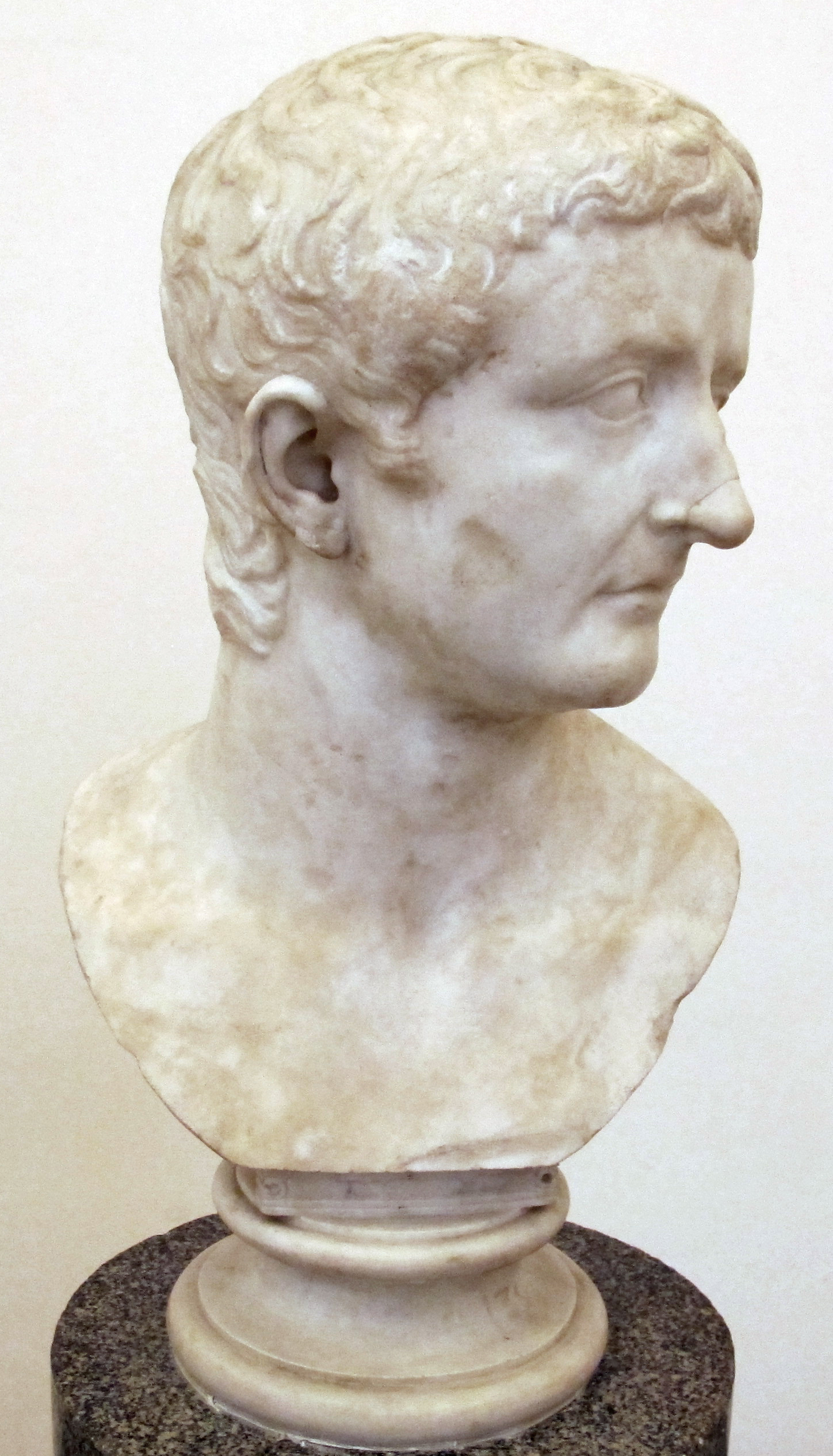
Bust of Tiberius belonging to the first portrait type of Tiberius, created perhaps around 19 BC (National Archaeological Museum of Naples).

With the problems in Moesia resolved, operations on the Illyrian front resumed, starting from the southern front. Under the command of Caecina, the governor of Galatia and Pamphylia, and Marcus Plautius Silvanus, and his two legions, the Legio IV Scythica and the Legio V Macedonica, would join them, bringing the number of legions under the general's command to five, adequately reinforced by auxiliaries and Thracian cavalry. The purpose of this new group was to reach the fortress of Siscia, where Tiberius' forces were stationed, as quickly as possible, so as to be able to continue the established plan with maximum speed.

== Location of the battle ==
Neither Velleius Paterculus nor Cassius Dio provide specific information regarding the location of the Volcaean Marshes within the province of Illyricum. However, modern scholarship has suggested that the location of the conflict should be the ancient center of Cibalae, in the vicinity of the present-day Croatian town of Vinkovci. The identification of this location as the likely theater of the battle is supported by the following evidence:

- Cibalae is not far from the three major rivers of the region (Drava, Sava, Danube), making the city a point of considerable strategic importance (so it is plausible that Caecina intended to head towards the city);
- Findings of amphorae dating back to the 1st century AD confirm the presence of a commercial road that crossed the area (therefore a route suitable for the movement of marching legions);
- It is reported that Sirmium was the starting point of Caecina' armies, that Tiberius' troops were in control of Siscia and that the two Roman armies came into contact some time after the battle. Cibalae is located between the two cities, in the area that was controlled by the rebels at the time (the massif of Fruska Gora, or Mount Almus at the time, is about 50 kilometres (31 mi) from the city and another 30 kilometres (19 mi) from Sirmium).

Velleius also presents on how the insurgents established themselves on Claudius Mountain (probably today's Central Slavonian hilly – Psunj massif – Papuk – Krndija – Dilj).

Both narratives do not contain contradictions, but complement each other, with Velleius's narrative giving significantly more details. We do not know the sources for the origin of Velleius's and Dio's narratives. Velleius Paterculus was in Illyricum at the time of this battle, but situated on the western front, in the wider area of roman stronghold and town Siscia, and was not a direct eyewitness or participant in the battle. He received possible information about the battle from contemporaries, other participants in the battle or because he read official reports about it, and perhaps someone also compiled a historical work with a description of the battle. Dio's narrative is more general, more concise without Velleius's rhetorical figures and criticism of the roman commanders-in-chief in that battle with the inevitable praise of Tiberius, but essentially does not call into question any specific Velleius's information. Cassius Dio used some already published literary source for information about the battle „near Volcaean marshes“, but apparently it was not Velleius's narrative about this battle because he did not mention it.

On the Tabula Peutingeriana there is a recorded locality of Pont Ulcae, between Ad Basante (somewhere on river Bosut in today's region of Western Syrmia) and Mursa Major (actually on the way to this settlement, east or rather southeast of it by about 18 kilometres (11 mi)). This would place the battle „near Volcaean marshes“ further to the east, and in that case it would take place at the very beginning of the movement of the troops of Caecina and Silvanus. This would in some way confirm the determination position of Pont Ulcae, because judging by the distances presented on the Tabula Peutingeriana, Pont Ulcae was 67 kilometres (42 mi) west of town of Sirmium, which would then correspond to middle courses of the rivers Bosut and Vuka (in today's Croatian part of region Syrmia). The unknown author of the Epitome de Caesaribus mentions a lake called Hiulca, also near the town of Cibalae, which would correspond exactly to the mentioned middle courses of the rivers Bosut and Vuka. River Vuka was known in antiquity as Volcos.

There is also a linguistic coincidence between Dio's Volcaean Marshes and the Celtic nation of the Volcae, according to Julius Caesar. It would not be impossible to assume that the Volcaean Marshes are a linguistic testimony to the fact that some branch of this great Celtic people settled at late iron age in southeast Pannonia, or that it at least dominated for some time. Perhaps these marshes were also the site of battles between Constantine and Licinius a little more than 300 years later, Zosimus reports. All this would suggest that these wetlands were situated in an important geographical, perhaps even traffic position.

== The battle ==
We have only two accounts of the battle available, both of which are quite scant in information on various points (description of the location, quantity of enemies, duration of the battle and losses suffered).

=== Velleius Paterculus ===
After leaving the stronghold of Sirmium with the five legions previously under his command and gathering Rhoemetalces' cavalry, Caecina Severus headed northwest, seeking to reunite his army with that of Tiberius. On the way, his troops camped along a road that ran through the Volcaean Marshes.

Velleius reports that Caecina sent out some scouts, probably some of the available cavalry, to reconnoitre and that he did not know the actual position of the enemy until the beginning of the battle itself.

While the construction of the camp was in progress, a massive horde of rebels emerged from the marshes surrounding the road, attacking the cavalry (both Thracian and imperial), causing them to immediately rout and flee from the battle zone. The same fate befell the auxiliaries, who were sent fleeing by the enemy forces. The strength and speed of the attack pushed the legionaries engaged in defending the camp to progressively lose ground, until they were forced to return to the camp itself and defend the position from the assault of the Illyrians. At that point in the battle, numerous officers, including several military tribunes and the camp prefect, had already fallen under enemy fire, while many centurions had been wounded and just as many killed. Nevertheless, the legionaries, although in a critical situation, showed surprising discipline, managing to regroup without receiving direct orders from their superiors and repel the enemy before counterattacking, breaking their ranks and obtaining a miraculous victory.

In fact, the following comment is reported regarding the battle, giving credit to the legionaries for having resisted the enemy:

«Sed Romani virtus militis plus eo tempore vindicavit gloriae quam ducibus reliquit, qui multum a more imperatoris sui discrepantes ante in hostem inciderunt. [...] Iam igitur in dubiis rebus semet ipsae legiones adhortatae,[...] invasere hostes nec sustinuisse contenti perrupta eorum acie ex insperato victoriam vindicaverunt.»

«But on this occasion, the valor of the Roman soldiers shone more than that of the commanders. […] these brave legions, spurring themselves on in such uncertain circumstances, […] fell upon the enemy and, not content with sustaining their onslaught, broke their ranks and won an unexpected victory.»

— Velleius Paterculus, II, 112.

=== Cassius Dio ===
In his story, it is reported that the rebels suddenly arrived in front of the camp, making the guards posted at the entrances inside the camp itself flee. It was at this point that the legionaries would have given proof of their value, repelling the assault attempts of the troops of the two Bato and forcing them to abandon the enterprise.

«After Germanicus reached Pannonia and armies were assembling there from many sides, the two Batos waited until Severus approached from Moesia and then fell upon him unexpectedly, while he was encamped near the Volcaean marshes. They frightened the pickets outside the ramparts and drove them back inside, but when the men in the camp stood their ground, the attackers were defeated.»

— Cassius Dio, LV, 32.

== Battle analysis ==
In both cases, the authors confirm that the Volcean Marshes ambush was a mass ambush, probably caused by the poor quality of the reconnaissance carried out by the Roman cavalry, in some ways similar to what happened in the Battle of Lake Trasimene against Hannibal during the Second Punic War.

The fact that Velleius reports that Severus and Plautius were unaware of the enemy's actual proximity introduces three possible scenarios:

- The reconnaissance forces ran into the enemy and were completely overwhelmed, unable to communicate the location and size of the rebel army;
- Indeed, some groups of rebels were sighted but they were few in number and therefore did not represent a threat to the marching army;
- The reconnaissance itself was hasty or carried out with few forces, perhaps due to the position of the camp itself and the roughness caused by the marshy ground.

Furthermore, we can note that one of the factors that contributed to both the ambush and the final salvation of the Roman legions was the geography of the place. On the one hand, the very nature of the marshes complicated Roman reconnaissance and greatly facilitated enemy ambushes; on the other hand, it was almost impossible for the rebels to storm a fortified Roman camp, where the defenders enjoyed the advantage of height (given by the certain presence of the walls and the probable presence of a moat surrounding the camp) combined with the presence of drier terrain, more suited to their characteristics as soldiers (considering the experience of the legionaries, it is reasonable to assume that they chose terrain ideal for construction and not marshy terrain).

Finally, it should be considered that the presence in the area of Tiberius' army, although about a hundred kilometers away, made a prolonged siege of the Roman camp by the rebels particularly risky, who in the worst case scenario would have had to face about ten regular legions and the same number of auxiliaries and cavalry. In that case, nothing could have prevented the irremediable defeat of the rebel forces and the subsequent end of the revolt.

== Consequences ==
We have no information regarding the actual losses suffered by the Romans during the battle, but assuming that the risk of losing the entire army was real, we can assume that Caecina's legionaries suffered considerable losses.

After saving his troops from the massacre, Caecina resumed his march, going against Tiberius and handing over his five legions to him. From a strategic point of view, the battle did not have great consequences for the continuation of the campaign in Illyricum. Indeed, the year was stingy with great progress and great battles, with this one exception.

There has long been speculation about the possibility that Arminius drew inspiration from the episode of the Volcaean Marshes to plan in detail his masterpiece at the Teutoburg : the similarity between the two battles is remarkable, with the only difference that in the first case, the readiness of the legions prevented the defeat. We know in fact that Arminius himself was an auxiliary of the Roman army, in particular a cavalry commander who served during the Illyrian revolt. It is therefore very likely that he was closely aware of what had happened, realistically for having heard it from other legionaries rather than for having participated in the event in person, even if this is not completely excluded.

The experience of the Volcaean Marshes was probably what prevented Caecina Severus from suffering a tragic defeat, similar to what happened to Publius Quinctillius Varus in the Battle of the Teutoburg Forest. The battle is similar to the Battle at the Pontes Longi about ten years later, in 15 AD, against Arminius.

== Legacy ==
The episode of the Volcanic Marshes is mentioned, although not explicitly named, in an episode of the German television series Barbaren, alluding that this was the source of inspiration for the German leader in planning his ambush in the Teutoburg Forests.

== Sources ==
- Velleius Paterculus. Historiae Romanae ad M. Vinicium consulem libri duo [Two books of Roman history to the consul Marcus Vinicius] (in Latin).
- Cassius Dio. Historiae Romanae [Roman history] (in Ancient Greek). (English translation here).
- Suetonius. De vita Caesarum [Lives of the Caesars] (in Latin). (Italian translation here).

== Literature ==
- Johne, Klaus-Peter (2006). Die Römer an der Elbe. Das Stromgebiet der Elbe im geographischen Weltbild und im politischen Bewusstsein der griechisch-römischen Antike (in German). Berlin.
- Goetz, Hans-Werner; Welwei, Karl-Wilhelm (1995). Altes Germanien. Auszüge aus den antiken Quellen über die Germanen und ihre Beziehungen zum römischen Reich (in German). Darmstadt.
