= Illyrian coastal and Macedonian raids =

- Part of the Bellum Batonianum
Date	Winter AD 6–7
Location	Eastern Adriatic coast to Apollonia and Roman Macedonia
Result	Initial Illyrian tactical successes

Belligerents
Illyrian rebels (Daesitiatae and Pannonians and other allies)	Roman Empire	Odrysian kingdom (Roman client)

Commanders and leaders
Bato the Daesitiate (WIA)	Tiberius; Valerius Messallinus; Rhoemetalces	

Units involved
Light infantry	Local garrisons, legionary vexillationes	

Strength
Unknown	Unknown	
- Part of the opening phase of the Great Illyrian Revolt, eventual Roman victory came through scorched earth and blockade in AD 8–9

The Illyrian coastal and Macedonian raids were a series of plundering expeditions conducted by the Dalmatian rebels during the winter of AD 6–7, as part of the opening phase of the Great Illyrian Revolt (AD 6–9).

== Background ==
The Bellum Batonianum (Latin for War of the Batos) or Great Illyrian Revolt was a military conflict fought in the Roman province of Illyricum in the 1st century AD, in which an alliance of native peoples of the two regions of Illyricum, Dalmatia and Pannonia, revolted against the Romans. The Roman historian Suetonius described the uprising as the most difficult conflict faced by Rome since the Punic Wars two centuries earlier.

The rebellion began among native peoples who had been recruited as auxiliary troops for the Roman army. They were led by Bato the Daesitiate, a chieftain of the Daesitiatae in the central part of present-day Bosnia and Herzegovina, and were later joined by the Breuci, a tribe in Pannonia led by Bato the Breucian. Many other tribes in Illyria also joined the revolt.

In AD 6, when governor Marcus Valerius Messalla Messallinus ordered the tribes to provide a contingent for Tiberius's second campaign against the Marcomanni, the warriors assembled and revolted under Bato.

== The raids ==
After failing to take Salona, the rebels avoided pitched battles with Tiberius and resorted to mobile raiding with very light weaponry, exploiting their knowledge of the terrain.

=== Raid along the coast to Apollonia ===
Following his wound at Salonae, Bato the Daesitiate sent detachments southward along the Adriatic coast. According to Cassius Dio, these forces "wrought havoc along the whole sea-coast as far as Apollonia". Although initially defeated by local Roman forces, the raiders subsequently won a battle in turn. This corresponds to modern scholarship which notes that raiders "continued pillaging along the coast all the way to Apollonia" after abandoning the siege of Salona.

=== Invasion of Macedonia ===
During the winter of AD 6–7, the rebels expanded operations southward into Roman Macedonia. Dio records that "when winter set in they did much greater damage, for they even invaded Macedonia again".

=== Roman response ===
Tiberius, fearing an invasion of Italy, returned from Germania and established his headquarters at Siscia. The Macedonian incursion was checked not by legions but by the Thracian client kings Rhoemetalces and his brother Rhascyporis.

The rebels then refused to defend their homeland when it was ravaged, taking refuge in mountain fortresses from which they made raiding expeditions whenever the chance offered.

== Aftermath ==
The raids were tactical successes but failed to achieve a strategic breakthrough. In AD 7–8 Tiberius adopted a counter-insurgency and scorched earth strategy, systematically ravaging settlements and crops to induce famine. Afflicted first by famine and then by disease, the Pannonians surrendered at the River Bathinus in AD 8, followed by the Dalmatians at Andetrium in AD 9.
