= Bato (Illyrian name) =

Bato (see alternatives below) is an Illyrian name.

== History ==
Bato is one of the most characteristic Illyrian names. It appears both as a male (Bato, Batas, Baton, Batun) and a female (Bateia, Batuia, Batea) name. It is attested from the southern Illyrian to the northern Illyrian (Delmato-Pannonian) region. Outside Illyria, it is found among Roman Illyrians soldiers from the Balkans in Europe, the Illyrian community in Alburnus Maior (Dacia), the Iapygian lands of southern Italy and the wider Hellenistic Mediterranean. In the form Baton (Βάτων) it must have reached Hellenistic Greece quite early, as it is already embedded in typically local anthroponymy in that era.

The female name Batea appears twice in Greek mythology: as the name of Batea of Troad, daughter of Teucer and wife of Dardanus and as the name of a nymph who married Oebalus of Sparta. Pausanias (2nd century CE) mentions a sanctuary to Baton near ancient Argos. His depiction of Baton is that of the charioteer of Amphiaraus. Stephanus of Byzantium names Baton as the cup-bearer of the mythical hero Amphiaraus. Baton was buried in Harpyia, a city in Illyria in the territory of the Enchelei. Indo-Europeanist Radoslav Katičić proposes that the name spread in Illyria and ancient Greece as a nomen sacrum used in cults and religious practices of the ancient Balkan peninsula.

== People ==
- Bato (Breucian chieftain) (fl. 8 CE), chieftain of the Breuci in the Bellum Batonianum (war of the Batos)
- Bato (Daesitiate chieftain) (fl. 35 BCE – 9 CE), chieftain of the Daesitiates in the Bellum Batonianum
- Bato (Dardanian chieftain) (fl. 206–176 BCE), chieftain of the Dardani

== Sources ==
- Katičić, Radoslav (1995). Illyricum mythologicum (in Croatian). Zagreb: Antibarbarus. ISBN 9789536160327.
