= Cornacates =

Ancient people of Pannonia

The Cornacates were a minor people of the Roman period, settled on the Danube in the south-east of the later province of Pannonia, around the fort of Cornacum (modern Sotin, Croatia). Most scholars regard them as a small community of the Roman period rather than an old tribe, and several identify them with a detached part of the Breuci. Their district was absorbed into the territory of the municipium of Cibalae under Hadrian.

== Name ==
The people are named by Pliny the Elder, who lists the Cornacates among the peoples of Pannonia. The form is also transmitted with the variants Carnacates and Corneates. It also recurs in two inscriptions: a pair of dedications set up in 102 AD by the civitas Cornacatium, and a military diploma of 54 AD recording a discharged auxiliary described as a Cornacatus. Ptolemy, whose account of Pannonia otherwise runs close to Pliny's, does not name them, most probably because their district had by then been taken into a municipal territory.

The ethnonym is formed from the place-name Cornacum (modern Sotin) and means 'the people of Cornacum'. The place-name derives from corno- with the suffix -āko-. Alexander Falileyev derives it from corno- with the suffix -āko- and notes that this would be a straightforwardly Celtic derivation were it attested in Gaul or Britain, but that in the central Balkans the base corno- may belong to another language. Péter Kovács takes the name as Celtic and renders it 'horn-like', a reference to the bend of the Danube at this point. Cornacum has also at times been classed as Illyrian. Alka Domić Kunić argues that Cornacates should be read as an oikonym meaning 'inhabitant of Cornacum' rather than as a wider ethnic name, comparing the Segestani, the inhabitants of Segestica who were otherwise Colapiani, and the Sirmienses, the inhabitants of Sirmium who were otherwise Amantini.

The personal names of the people themselves are of a different stamp. The recipient of the diploma of 54 AD, Dases son of Dasmenus, and the women named alongside him carry names of Illyrian-Pannonian type, the one possible exception being Turuna, which may be Celtic.

== Geography ==
The Cornacates lived along the Danube in the south-east of Pannonia, in the angle of the river between Vukovar and Ilok, in what is now eastern Croatia. Their name ties them to Cornacum, the auxiliary fort and settlement on the Danube identified with modern Sotin. The Barrington Atlas locates their territory in the area of Cornacum and Cibalae (modern Vinkovci).

In the list of Pannonian civitates that can be read off from Pliny, taken downstream along the Danube, the Cornacates fall between the Andizetes to the north-west and the Amantini towards Sirmium to the south-east. Alka Domić Kunić observes that a separate Cornacate territory would be strikingly small, confined to the neighbourhood of Sotin, and would overlap with the Danubian part of the land of the Breuci.

== History ==
=== Origins ===
The Cornacates are first recorded in the imperial period and carry a name taken from a place. András Mócsy regarded the Pannonian peoples with names of this kind as in large part new units organised by Rome, the Cornacates being called after Cornacum. On this view they were a small community formed when the larger pre-Roman tribal territories of southern Pannonia were broken up, with their centre at Cornacum. The dismantling of the larger native alliances into smaller civitates is linked to the suppression of the Pannonian revolt of 6–9 AD, although firm proof is wanting. The land once held by the Scordisci is taken to have passed in this way to the Andizetes, Cornacates and Amantini.

The character of the community is disputed. Ivan Radman-Livaja and Hana Ivezić regard the Cornacates as a minor group ethnically related to the Breuci. Alka Domić Kunić and Marin Zaninović deny that they formed a distinct people at all and identify them with a part of the Breuci that Rome detached for strategic reasons after the revolt. Miroslava Mirković instead links them with the Amantini. The wider assumption that Rome created communities of this kind has itself been questioned by Maurizio Colombo.

=== Under Roman rule ===
After the conquest the young men of the Pannonian communities were levied into the Roman auxiliary forces, and the Cornacates are among the few southern Pannonian peoples actually attested as supplying men to the Pannonian army. The earliest firm evidence is the diploma of 54 AD granted to a Cornacate veteran, which implies that conscription from the group had begun under Tiberius.

Under the Principate the people made up a civitas peregrina, the civitas Cornacatium. In 102 AD this civitas set up two inscriptions in honour of a serving governor of Pannonia, a dedication that places its territory within Pannonia and not, as had been proposed, within Moesia Superior. Grants of Roman citizenship followed under Trajan, and natives bearing the emperor's nomen Ulpius are attested among the Cornacates. The civitas is last documented at the beginning of the 2nd century and came to an end when Hadrian founded the municipium of Cibalae, whose territory absorbed the former Cornacate district, Cornacum itself lying not far from Cibalae on the Danube. (Note: The fort and settlement of Cornacum outlasted the civitas. It remained a garrison on the Danube and is still listed in late Roman sources, including the Notitia Dignitatum and the Ravenna Cosmography.)
