= Bato =

Bato may refer to:

== People ==
=== Given name ===
- Bato (Illyrian name)
  - Bato (Dardanian chieftain) (fl. 206–176 BCE), chieftain of the Dardani in Illyria
  - Bato the Daesitiate (fl. 35 BCE–9 CE), chieftain of the Daesitiates in Illyria
  - Bato the Breucian (fl. 8 CE), chieftain of the Breuci in Illyria

=== Surname ===
- István Bató (1812–1890), Hungarian businessman
- Joseph Bato (1888–1966), Hungarian artist, film art director and costume designer
- Mohammad Zainoden Bato (1944 or 1945–2021), Filipino Moro revolutionary and politician

=== Nickname ===
- Bahrudin Čengić (1931–2007), Bosnian screenwriter and film director
- Ronald dela Rosa (born 1962), Filipino politician and former Director General of the Philippine National Police
- Bato Govedarica (1928–2006), Serbian-American National Basketball Association player

== Places ==
=== Philippines ===
- Bato, Camarines Sur, a 3rd class municipality
  - Bato station, a railway station
- Bato, Catanduanes, a 5th class municipality
- Bato, Leyte, a 4th class municipality
- Lake Bato, Camarines Sur

=== Elsewhere ===
- Bato or Vato, a small mountain town in Burma, site of a battle in the Burma Campaign
- Bato, Tochigi, Japan, a former town, now part of Nakagawa

== Arts and entertainment ==
- Bato: The General Ronald dela Rosa Story, a 2019 Filipino biographical film
- Bato, a character from the TV series Avatar: The Last Airbender
- "Bato", lead track of the 1994 album Circus by Eraserheads

== Other uses ==
- Bato (culture), pre-Columbian culture of the present Central Chile; for example, see El Quisco
- Dutch ship Staaten Generaal, renamed Bato in 1798
- Bato (website), an illegal manga piracy website operating from 2014 to 2026

== See also ==
- Bato, Bato, a 1984 studio album by Bosnian singer Lepa Brena
