= Aulus Caecina Severus =

Roman politician and general during the reigns of Augustus and Tiberius

Consul of Rome of 1 BC
- In office July 1 BC – December 1 BC Serving with Aulus Plautius
- Preceded by: Cossus Cornelius Lentulus Gaetulicus with Lucius Calpurnius Piso the Augur
- Succeeded by: Gaius Caesar with Lucius Aemilius Paullus

Personal details
- Born: Unknown
- Died: Unknown
- Children: 6

Military service
- Allegiance: Roman Empire

Aulus Caecina Severus was a Roman politician and general who was consul in 1 BC. He was Emperor Augustus' representative in Moesia when the Great Illyrian Revolt broke out. As a result, he spent 4 years in heavy fighting against the Illyrian tribes before the revolt was suppressed by the Romans. In 14 AD he was in charge of several legions on the lower Rhine which mutinied on the death of Augustus. He was recorded as having handled this poorly, with the situation only being salvaged by the intervention of his commander-in-chief, Germanicus.

Over the next two years, while campaigning in Germany, Caecina led his legions with skill and verve. At the conclusion of one hard-fought battle he famously routed the army of Arminius, who seven years earlier had destroyed three Roman legions. He was eulogised by the chroniclers for his exploits. On his return to Rome he was awarded triumph honours.

== Biography ==
Aulus Caecina Severus was descended from a distinguished Volaterran family of Etruscan origin. He made his name as a military man and was appointed consul by emperor Augustus in 1 BC. Becoming a consul was considered the highest honour of the Roman state and the emperor would have chosen candidates to fill it carefully.

=== Illyrian revolt ===
In 6 AD he was the envoy of the emperor in Moesia when the Great Illyrian Revolt erupted. Severus was called upon to take his legions south to suppress the revolt. In Illyria he was joined by the forces of Marcus Plautius Silvanus. In 7 AD their combined armies met the Daesitiates and the Breuci at the Battle of Sirmium. The Romans won a hard-fought victory, but their losses were so heavy that they could not follow it up. Caecina was then forced to quickly return to Moesia, as Dacian and Sarmatian raiders were causing havoc in the province. For the next two years he continued to fight the rebels in Illyricum, inflicting another defeat on them in 8 AD as they attempted to prevent him from marching to link up in Pannonia with Germanicus, the heir of Augustus' successor, Tiberius. The revolt was finally put down in 9 AD.

=== The Rhine revolt ===
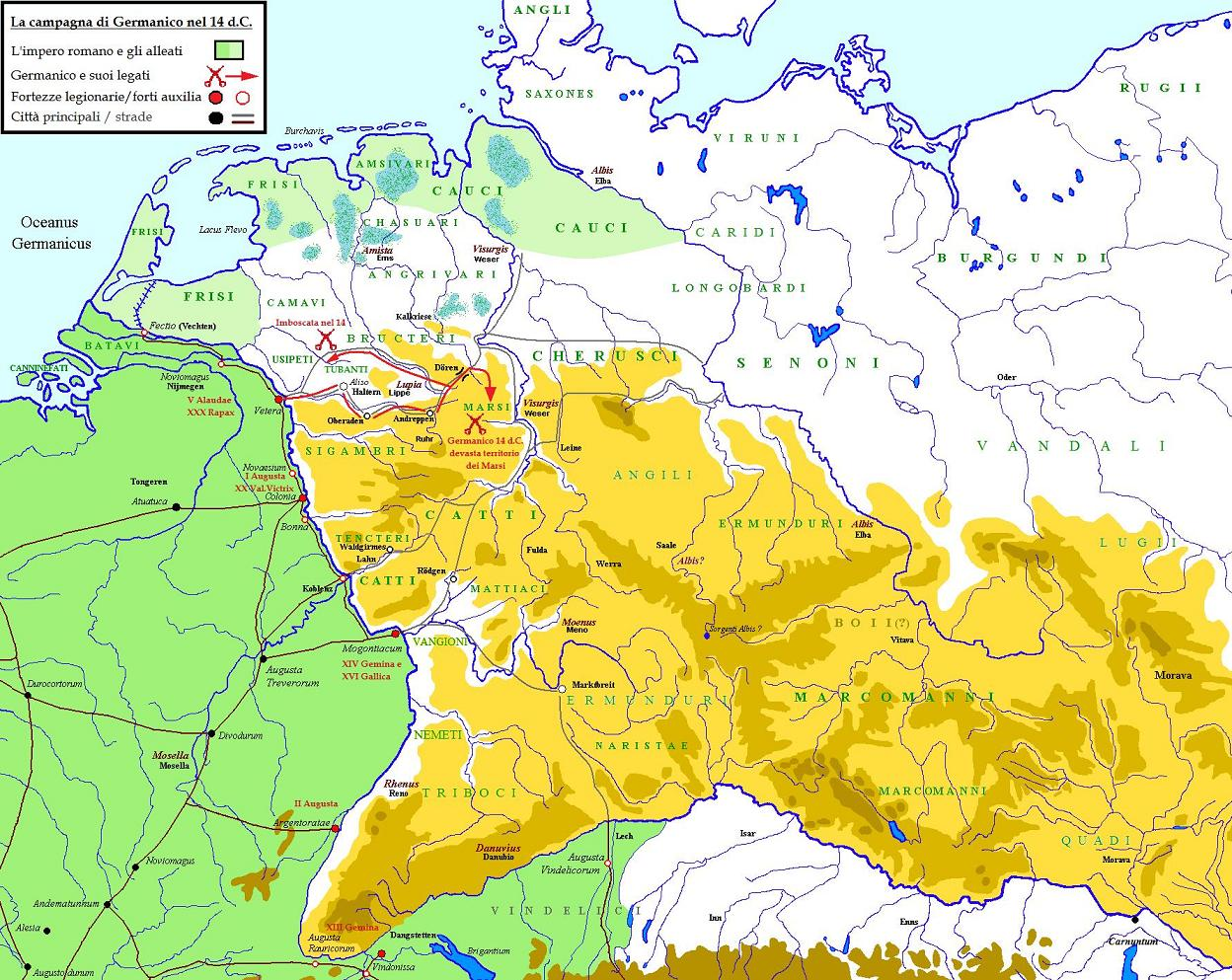
Germanicus' campaign of 14 AD

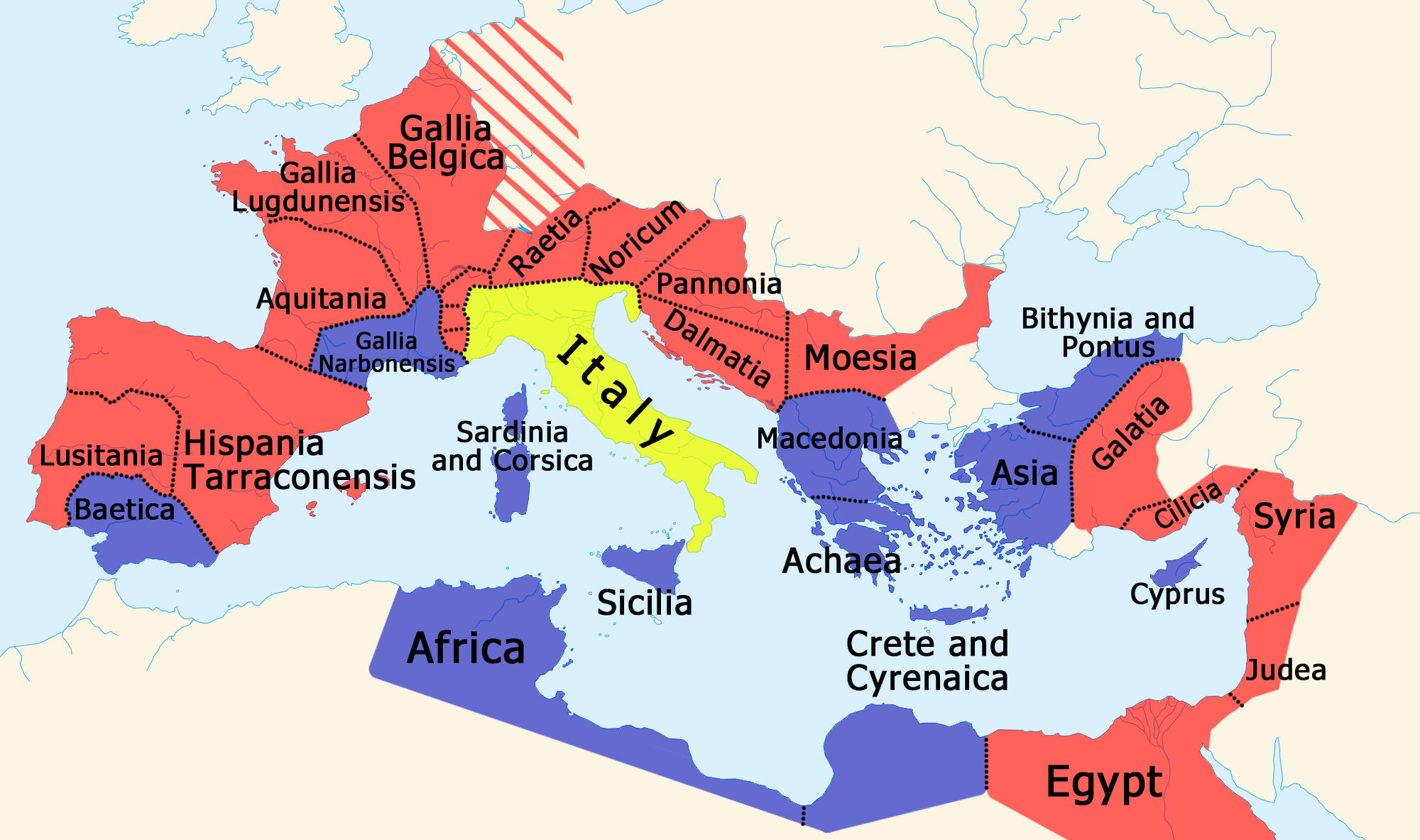
Roman provinces at the time of Caecina Imperial provinces Senatorial provinces Italy

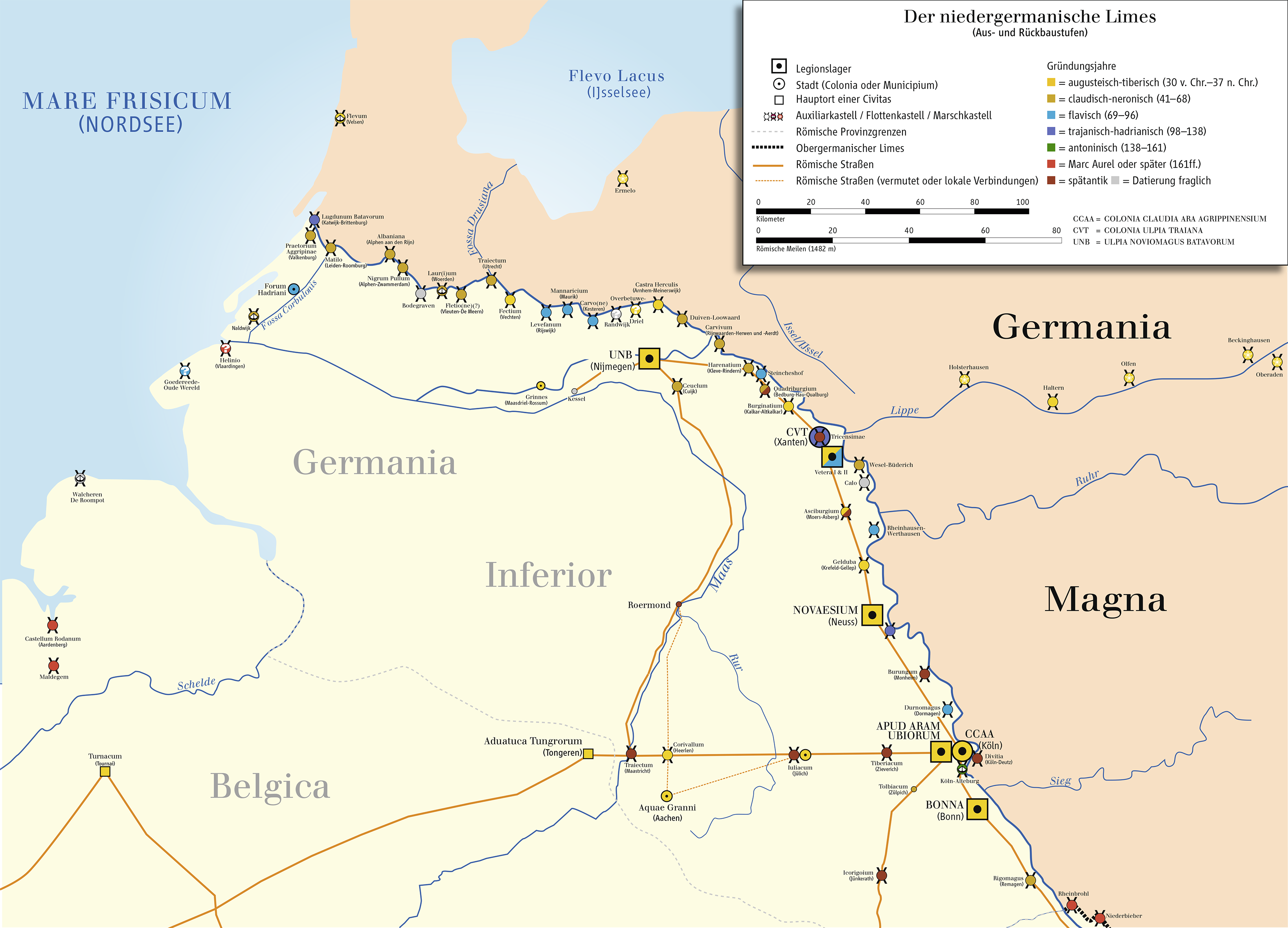
Map of the Lower (northern) Germanic limes showing the legionary camps and forts in Germania Inferior.

Around 14 AD, Caecina was the legate in charge of the legions along the lower Rhine frontier in Gallia Belgica (what would later become Germania Inferior), under the overall command of Germanicus. When the Rhine legions rebelled following the death of Augustus, the men under Caecina were at the forefront, demanding the demobilisation of men who had served an excessive number of campaigns, and an increase in pay for the rest. Caecina apparently lost his nerve over the mutiny. He initially made no move to stop the disorder from spreading, and when centurions sought his protection, he agreed, albeit reluctantly, to hand them over to the legionaries to be tortured and killed. Germanicus was forced to intervene. When he arrived he eventually agreed to the troops' demands. He managed to come up with the money to pay some of the legions and ordered Caecina to take the First and Twentieth legions back to Oppidum Ubiorum (Cologne), together with the depleted treasury.

When Germanicus arrived at Oppidum Ubiorum, he sent Caecina to Castra Vetera (Xanten), where the mutinous legions V Alaudae and XXI Rapax were stationed. Determined to make an example of them, he ordered Caecina to announce to the troops that unless they punished the principal troublemakers, he would come in with a larger army and execute a large number of soldiers at random. Caecina discussed the situation with men he could trust, and they agreed to obey his orders and kill the mutiny's ringleaders before Germanicus arrived.

=== German wars ===
The following year (15 AD) Caecina was involved in the campaign against Arminius, the leader of the Germans who had famously defeated Publius Quinctilius Varus at the Battle of the Teutoburg Forest and destroyed three legions, not including a large number of auxiliaries and camp followers. Germanicus, who first proceeded to attack the Chatti, left him in command of four legions on the Rhine. Caecina was soon forced to turn back a Cherusci advance. He then followed this up with a successful battle against the Marsi. Hearing that Arminius had gathered together a large coalition of forces, Germanicus sent Caecina with forty cohorts towards the Ems as a diversionary tactic, ravaging the countryside as he marched. Rejoining Germanicus, they pushed towards the Teutoburg Forest. Caecina was sent in advance to scout the route, as well as build bridges and causeways so that the army could cross the numerous areas of marshland.

After fighting an indecisive battle with Arminius, Germanicus ordered Caecina to take his original forces and march back to the Rhine. Arriving at a spot referred to as Pontes Longi, or "long causeways," and finding it impassable, Caecina began repairs to the causeways so that he could continue his march towards the Rhine. However, he was attacked by Arminius who just managed to hold him off when night fell. The next day, the two armies joined in battle again. The Roman legions became separated and were again almost defeated. Caecina, trying to hold the front line against the Germans, had his horse killed under him, and he only survived due to the timely intervention of the First Legion. When Caecina saw many of the Germans turning from fighting to plundering the baggage carts and pack mules, he gave orders for the baggage to be abandoned. This was the key reason the First and Twentieth legions were able to withdraw and rejoin the Fifth and Twenty-First legions on dry land by nightfall.

During the night a rumour spread that the Germans had broken into the camp, causing the troops to rush the gates in an attempt to escape. Caecina, unsuccessful in attempting to convince the soldiers that there was no attack underway, was forced to throw himself on the ground under the gateway to persuade the soldiers to stop and listen.

During the night Arminius counselled in favour of letting the Romans leave their camp in the morning and resume their march to the Rhine. Arminius explained that once the legionaries were in the open and clear of the camp, the Cheruscans could wipe them out. But Arminius’ uncle, Inguiomerus, did not want to give the Romans a chance to escape. He advised attacking their camp at dawn and over-running it. Other chiefs concurred. So Arminius, outvoted, agreed to lead a dawn attack on the Roman camp.

In the morning, with Caecina having stiffened his army's morale, the Romans managed to defeat the Germans attacking the camp and caused them to flee the battlefield. Caecina was then able to complete the repairs to the Long Bridge and return to the Rhine. As a result of this victory, he was awarded triumphal honours. (Note: After 14 BC, it became the policy of the founder-emperor Augustus, and of his successors, to grant full Triumphs only to members of their own ruling Julio-Claudian dynasty. As a substitute, victorious generals who were unrelated to the imperial house were awarded insignia (or ornamenta) triumphalia. That is, the dress and privileges traditionally granted to a triumphator, without the elaborate triumphal procession through Rome at the head of his troops. Maxfield, Valerie A. (1981). The Military Decorations of the Roman Army. Berkeley: University of California Press. p. 105. ISBN 978-0-520-04499-9.) (Note: Tacitus claims that the Romans won the battle at pontes longi; however, Wells says the battle was inconclusive (Wells 2003, p 206).)

The next year, 16 AD, still on campaign with Germanicus in Germania, Caecina was entrusted with the task of building a fleet of 1,000 ships to transport the Roman armies from the North Sea into the interior of Germany via the River Ems, a task which he completed. It is assumed that he marched alongside Germanicus during this campaign, and returned with Germanicus to Rome at the end of the year.

=== Later career ===
Taking his place in the Senate, Caecina put forward a motion in 20 AD that an altar be erected to the goddess of vengeance giving thanks for what was termed the righteous death of Gnaeus Calpurnius Piso, who was widely believed to be responsible for the death of Germanicus in 19 AD. The emperor Tiberius vetoed the motion. In 21 AD Caecina moved another motion in the Senate during a debate over the post of proconsular governor of Africa, this time to prohibit the governors of provinces taking their wives with them when they began their term in office. His speech was frequently interrupted by other senators, who observed that this was not the point of the current debate, and that Caecina was not qualified to act in the role of censor in such a matter. His motion was opposed by Marcus Valerius Messalla Messallinus and Drusus Julius Caesar, after which it failed to be carried.

== Family ==
Caecina was married and had six children. His brother was Gaius Caecina Largus, suffect consul in 13.

== Notes ==
Political offices
Preceded by Cossus Cornelius Lentulus Gaetulicus; Lucius Calpurnius Piso the Augur	Consul suffectus of the Roman Empire; 1 BC; With: Aulus Plautius	Succeeded by Gaius Caesar; Lucius Aemilius Paullus
