= Pinnes (Pannonian chieftain) =

Pannonian chieftain

Pinnes or Pinnetes was a Pannonian chieftain, who led a rebellion alongside Breucian chieftain Bato (part of the wider bellum Batonianum) until Bato betrayed him and handed him over to the Romans, thus securing the rule over the Breuci.

== See also ==
- Illyrian warfare
- List of rulers of Illyria
