= Legio XX Valeria Victrix =

Roman legion

Map of the Roman Empire in AD 125, under emperor Hadrian, showing the Legio XX Valeria Victrix, stationed at Deva Victrix (Chester, England), in the province of Britannia. They were stationed there from AD 88 until at least the late 3rd century.

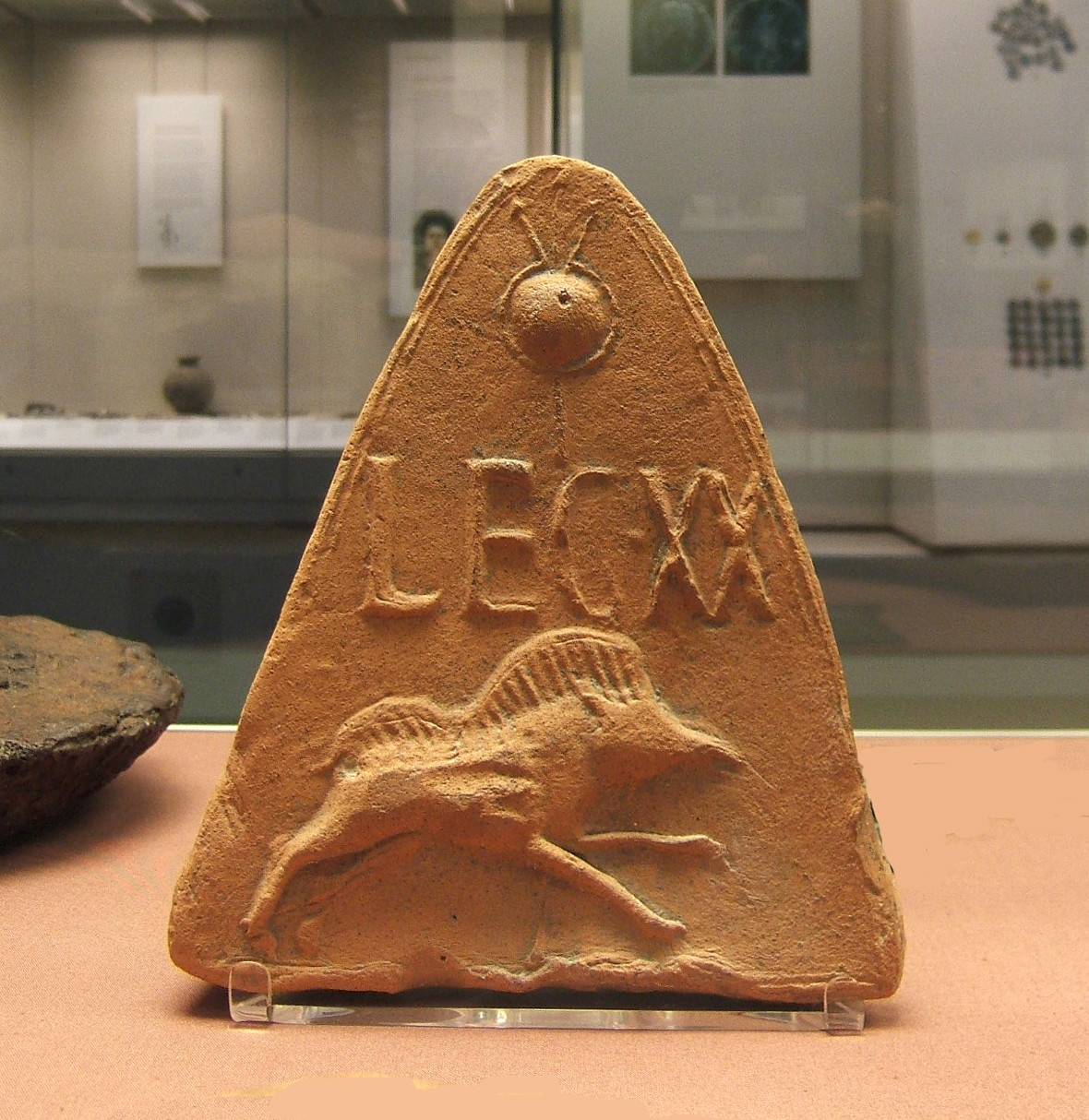
Moulded antefix roof tile showing the badge and standard of Legion XX, from Holt, Clwyd, Wales

Legio XX Valeria Victrix, in English the Twentieth Victorious Valeria Legion, was a legion of the Imperial Roman army.

The origin of the Legion's name is unclear and there are various theories, but the legion may have gained its title Valeria Victrix from a victory it achieved during the Great Illyrian revolt under the command of the general Marcus Valerius Messalla Messallinus. The legion had a boar as its emblem.

== History ==
The legion was probably founded shortly after 31 BC by the emperor Augustus.

XX Valeria victrix was probably part of the large Roman force that fought in the Cantabrian Wars in Hispania from 25 to 19 BC.

The legion then moved to Burnum in Illyricum at the beginning of the Great Illyrian revolt (Bellum Batonianum) in AD 6. It is recorded operating against the Marcomanni in AD 6 in the army of Tiberius.

In Illyria they were led by the governor of Illyricum, Marcus Valerius Messalla Messallinus, who may have given his clan (gens) name Valeria to the legion. Although understrength, they managed to defeat the rebels led by Bato of the Daesitiates. In one battle the legion cut through the enemy lines, was surrounded, and cut its way out again.

After the disaster of Varus in AD 9, XX Valeria Victrix moved to Germania Inferior and was based at Oppidum Ubiorum, then moved to Novaesium at the site of modern Neuss during Tiberius' reign.

The legion was one of the four with which Claudius invaded Britain in 43 AD. It was also one of the legions that defeated Caratacus at the Battle of Caer Caradoc, after which, from the AD 50s, it was encamped at Camulodunum, with a few units at Kingsholm in Gloucester.

Around AD 55 under the command of Manlius Valens it moved to Usk, in an unsuccessful attempt to pacify the Silures, a tribe very resistant to the imposition of Roman rule in Wales. But the legion suffered defeat, resulting in Valens’ replacement as legate In AD 60 or 61 the Twentieth helped put down the revolt of queen Boudica, after outflanking the Ordovices it took part in the second Roman invasion of Anglesey which destroyed the Celtic Druids and their religious practices. In AD 66, the legion was transferred to the much more passive Viroconium (Wroxeter). It may also have occupied Gloucester (Glevum) at this time.

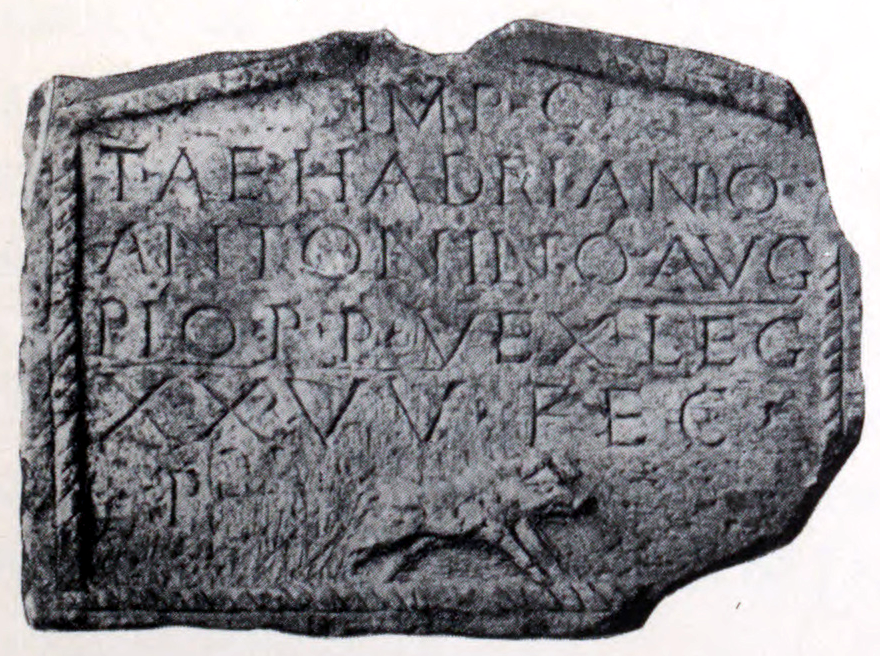
RIB 2199. Distance Slab of the Twentieth Legion Valeria Victrix George MacDonald calls in no. 13 in the 2nd edition of his book The Roman Wall in Scotland. It was found near Cleddans, close to Duntocher. It may have been a "waster" and lacks distance data. It has been scanned and a video produced.

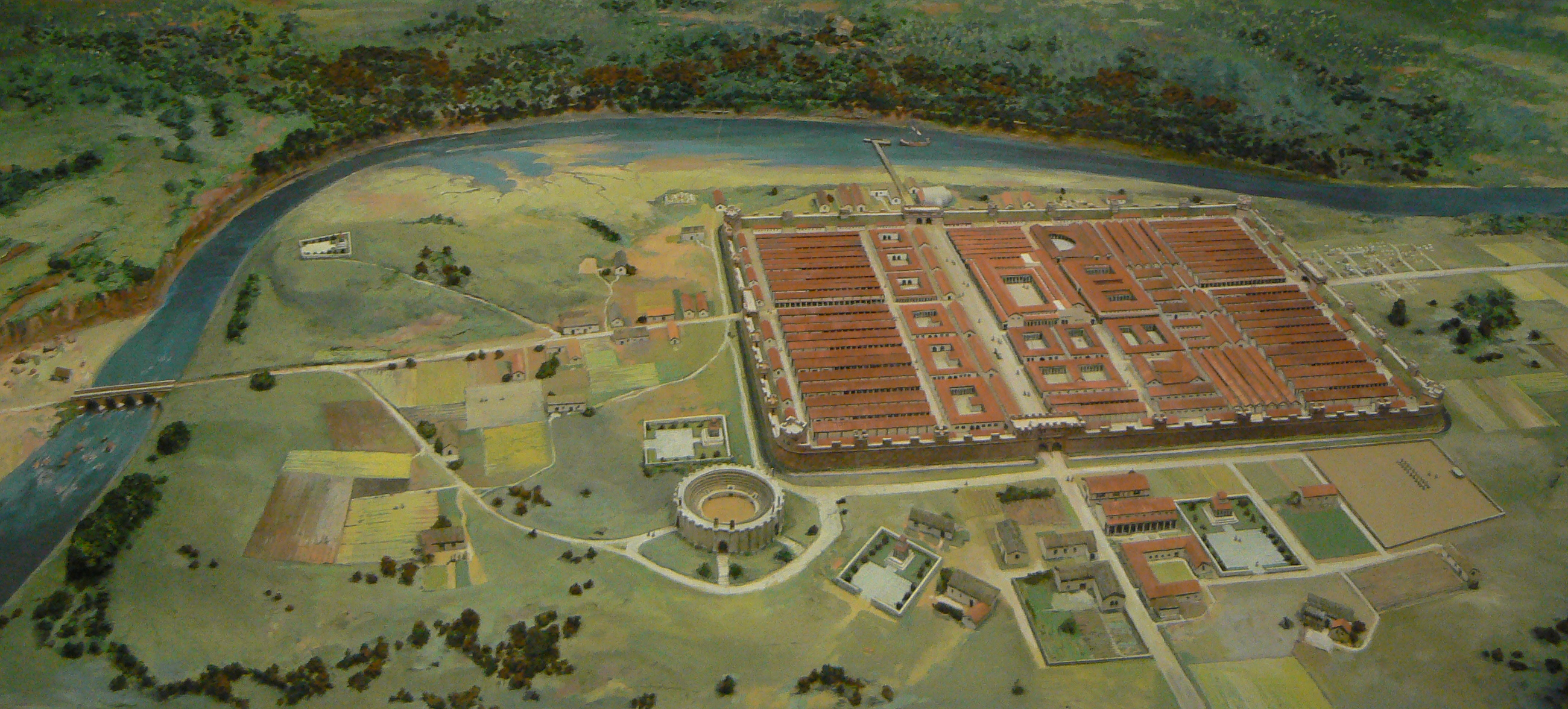
Legio XX built Deva Victrix (now Chester), a Roman castrum shown in the figure. The Legio was stationed in Roman Britain until the beginning of the fifth century

In the year of the four emperors, the legion sided with Vitellius. Some units went with him to Rome. In AD 78–84, the legion was part of Gnaeus Julius Agricola's campaigns in northern Britannia and Caledonia, and built the base at Inchtuthill. In AD 88 the legion returned south and occupied Castra Deva (Deva Victrix), where it remained based for at least two centuries.

The Twentieth was among the legions involved with the construction of Hadrian's Wall, and the discovery of stone altars commemorating their work in Caledonia suggests that they had some role in building the Antonine Wall.

The legion probably went on campaign in 196 under Decimus Clodius Albinus into Gaul, and would have suffered heavy losses in Gaul before returning to Britain.

During the Carausian Revolt, which established the Britannic Empire under Carausius and Allectus in the 280s and 290s, the XX Valeria Victrix was still active. No further information is known after this period and scholars believe Legio XX was still stationed in Britain when Constantine III pulled the bulk of the military forces from there in the year 407 for his doomed campaign on the continent.

This legion has been much studied; at least 250 members of the legion have been identified in surviving inscriptions.

== Attested members ==
Name	Rank	Time frame	Province	Source
Marcus Roscius Coelius	legatus legionis	69-70	Britannia	Tacitus, Histories, I.60
Gnaeus Julius Agricola	legatus legionis	70-73	Britannia	Tacitus, Agricola 7.3
Lucius Pomponius Mamilianus	legatus legionis	early 90s	Britannia	CIL VII, 164
Julius Vitalis	fabriciensis	between 71 and 100	Britannia	CIL VII, 49
Marcus Aemilius Papus	legatus legionis	c. 128	Britannia	CIL II, 1371
Gaius Curtius Justus	legatus legionis	between 140 and 145	Britannia	CIL III, 1458
Lucius Cestius Gallus	legatus legionis	between 160 and 180	Britannia	CIL X, 3722
Tiberius Claudius Balbilus	military tribune	c. 43	Britannia	
Marcus Accenna Helvius Agrippa	tribunus laticlavius	2nd century	Britannia	CIL II, 1262
Lucius Aemilius Naso Fabullinus	tribunus laticlavus	2nd century	Britannia	CIL VI, 29683CIL VI, 29684
Marcus Caelius Flavius Proculus	tribunus laticlavus	2nd century	Britannia	CIL XI, 3883
Sextus Flavius Quietus	centurion primus pilus	2nd century	Britannia	AE 1960, 28

== Fiction ==
Legio XX Valeria Victrix and their final days in Deva (Chester) in the early AD 400s form the backdrop to the Tom Stevens mythic fiction genre novel The Cauldron (special edition) with the story's protagonist Valerian—the Praefectus and Chief Centurion—defending the city with the rump of the legion against the incursions of Hibernian pirates as the "Dark Ages" settle on Britannia. The movie Victrix! The Valiant of Albion is in production and features an adaptation of Stevens' novel.

Legio XX Valeria Victrix was the legion featured in the novel Eagle in the Snow; author Wallace Breem postulates that they were annihilated by the Germanic invasion of 406.

Several of the main characters in the early novels of Jack Whyte's A Dream of Eagles series were former members of Legio XX Valeria Victrix.

Gaius Petreius Ruso, protagonist of Medicus by Ruth Downie, is a military doctor in Britannia attached to Legio XX.

Legio XX Valeria Victrix lends its name to the character Valeria Matuchek in Poul Anderson's Operation Chaos and its sequel Operation Luna; her mother is said to describe this legion as the last to leave Britain—"the last that stood against Chaos".

The first person narrator of Stephen Vincent Benét's short story "The Last of the Legions" is the senior centurion of the Valeria Victrix, who recounts the events and the impressions of soldiers and populace surrounding the departure of the legion from Britain.

Legion Company of the U.S. Army's 1st battalion, 503rd Infantry Regiment, 173rd Airborne Brigade stationed in Vicenza, Italy is named after Legio XX. They chose this name for the paratroopers' ability to fight fiercely behind enemy lines.

Legio XX Valeria Victrix features in the six-novel series Soldier of Rome: The Artorian Chronicles by James Mace.

Legio XX Valeria Victrix is mentioned in Sir Arthur Conan Doyle’s short story "Through the Veil".

== See also ==
- List of Roman legions
