= Battle at Pontes Longi =

Inconclusive battle in Germania between the Romans and Germanic tribes

- Part of the Roman campaigns in Germania (12 BC – AD 16)
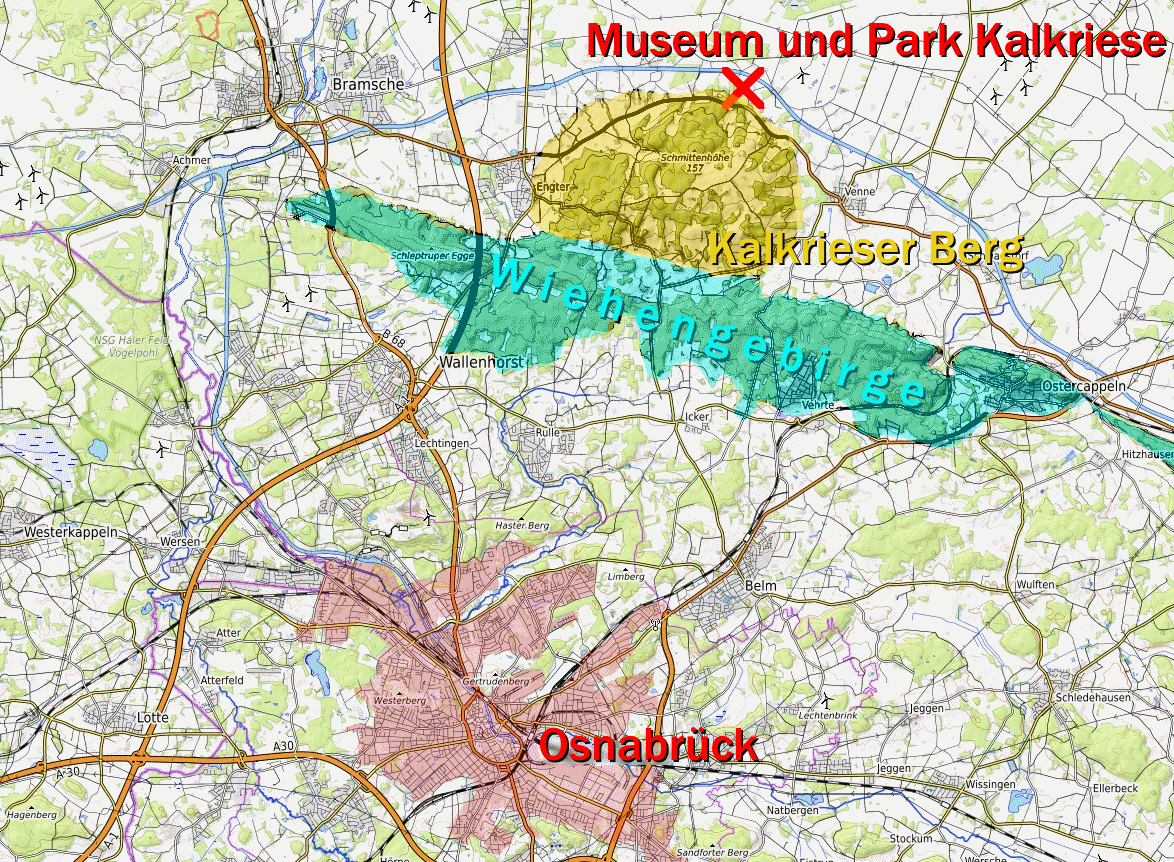
- Location of Kalkriese archeological site
Date	15 AD
Location	Near Bramsche, Germany
Result	Roman victory (Tacitus); Inconclusive (modern historians)

Belligerents
Roman Empire	Germanic tribes: Cherusci; Chatti; Bructeri; Chauci; Other tribes

Commanders and leaders
Aulus Caecina Severus	Arminius

Strength
Legio I Germanica; Legio V Alaudae; Legio XX Valeria Victrix; Legio XXI Rapax; Total: 28,000–30,000	Unknown

Casualties and losses
Unknown	Unknown

The Battle at Pontes Longi was fought near Bramsche, Germany in 15 AD between the Roman general Aulus Caecina Severus and an alliance of Germanic peoples commanded by Arminius. It was part of a three-year series of campaigns by Germanicus in Germania. According to Tacitus, the battle ended with a Roman victory.

After fighting an indecisive battle with Arminius, Germanicus ordered Caecina to take his original forces and march back to the Rhine. Arriving at a spot referred to as the "long causeways" and finding it impassable, Caecina began repairs to the causeways so he could continue his march towards the Rhine. However, he was attacked by Arminius and just managed to hold him off when night fell. The next day, the two armies joined in battle again. The Roman legions became separated and were again almost defeated. Caecina, trying to hold the front line against the Germans, had his horse killed under him. He only survived due to the timely intervention of the First Legion. When Caecina saw many of the Germans turning from the fighting to plunder the baggage carts and pack mules, he gave orders for the baggage to be abandoned. This was the key reason the First and Twentieth legions were able to withdraw and rejoin the Fifth and Twenty-First legions on dry land by nightfall.

During the night a rumor spread that the Germans had broken into the camp, causing the troops to rush the gates in an attempt to escape. Caecina, unsuccessful in attempting to convince the soldiers that there was no attack underway, was forced to throw himself on the ground under the gateway to persuade the soldiers to stop and listen.

During the night Arminius counseled in favor of letting the Romans leave their camp in the morning and resume their march to the Rhine. Arminius explained that once the legionaries were in the open and clear of the camp, the Cheruscans could wipe them out. But Arminius’ uncle, Inguiomerus, did not want to give the Romans a chance to escape. He advised attacking their camp at dawn and over-running it. Other chiefs concurred. So Arminius, outvoted, agreed to lead a dawn attack on the Roman camp.

In the morning, with Caecina having stiffened his army’s morale, the Romans managed to defeat the Germans attacking the camp and caused them to flee the battlefield. Caecina was then able to complete the repairs to the Long Bridge and return to the Rhine. As a result of this victory, he was awarded triumphal honours.

== Research ==
The actual location of the battle is unknown but many scholars have argued that the Kalkriese excavations actually point to the campaign of Germanicus instead of Varus. As such it may show a victorious battle of Arminius where the Romans suffered heavy losses cancelling the campaign early. The Roman sources do only tell of an inconclusive outcome but the writings of Tacitus indicate that the Romans returned without their cavalry. As such the legions were split early after the battle. In the vicinity of Kalkriese an ancient log road was found near Bramsche about 10 km away from Kalkriese. The dendrological examinations of the logs point to the year 15 AD which matches with the construction works reported to be done by the retreating legions. Accompanying finds of wooden swords and clubs support the idea of a battle at that site. However other scholars have argued that the site is too far away from the Rhine to be a road created by the Romans as the sources suggest. It would be just a typical German log road that may have been reconstructed for the battle by the Germans. The real 'long bridges' would be probably further southwest with the region between modern Münster and Coesfeld to be most likely, as it is closer to the roads between the legion's main garrison at Xanten and its known outpost near Haltern.
