= Breuci =

Ancient Illyrian-Pannonian people

The Breuci (Ancient Greek: Βρεῦκοι) were an ancient Illyrian-Pannonian people who inhabited the middle and lower valley of the Sava (the Posavina), in a region corresponding to modern Slavonia in Croatia and northern Bosnia. They were among the most powerful communities of southern Pannonia at the time of the Roman conquest, and they led the Pannonian side of the great Pannonian–Dalmatian revolt of AD 6 to 9 under their leader Bato. After their subjugation the Roman army raised an exceptional number of auxiliary units from among them, and Breucian soldiers are recorded in inscriptions across the Empire, which makes the Breuci the best represented of the southern Pannonian peoples in the epigraphic record. They are mentioned by Strabo, Pliny the Elder, Ptolemy and Cassius Dio.

== Name ==
The Breuci are recorded by Strabo as Breukoi (Βρεῦκοι), as Breuci by Pliny the Elder, who lists them among the peoples along the Sava, and by Ptolemy. Cassius Dio names them in his account of the revolt of 6 to 9 AD. The ethnonym is also widely attested in inscriptions and military diplomas, both in the names of auxiliary units and in soldiers who identified themselves as Breuci. The same form Breucus was used as a personal name among the Breuci and other Pannonians.

The ethnonym is generally taken to be of Pannonian formation. Patrizia de Bernardo Stempel has proposed instead a Celtic etymology with the sense 'grinders'.

== Ethnic identity ==
The Breuci are classed by most scholars as Illyrian-Pannonian, although a few of their recorded names could be read as Celtic or Celticised Illyrian. Maurizio Colombo has argued that they were rather a Celto-Illyrian population.

== Geography ==
The Breuci occupied the middle and lower Sava valley, in the Posavina, south and south-east of the Požega Valley. Their neighbours were the Andizetes to the north towards the Drava, the Oseriates to the west, and the Amantini to the east. Alka Domić Kunić places their territory from the mouth of the Orljava eastwards along both banks of the Sava as far as the Danube near Vukovar, with principal centres at Cibalae (Vinkovci) and Marsonia (Slavonski Brod). The minor community of the Cornacates, organised under Roman rule as a separate civitas around Cornacum, is thought to have been of Breucian stock. A boundary set up under the governor of Dalmatia, Cornelius Dolabella, the so-called Tabulae Dolabellae, records the river Bathinus, identified with the Bosna, as dividing the Breuci from the Oseriates.

The territory the Breuci held before the conquest was considerably larger than the later civitas Breucorum. After the revolt of AD 6 to 9 Rome broke up the extensive lands they had once dominated, and the wide tribal territory they had shared with the Amantini was dismembered.

== History ==
=== Background and Roman conquest ===
By the Iron Age the Breuci had become one of the most powerful peoples of southern Pannonia, with a separate identity and a political importance that is documented in the sources describing the Roman conquest. In the decades before that conquest the power of the Taurisci and the Scordisci, who had earlier dominated the region, had been much reduced by pressure from the Dacians and from the Pannonians themselves.

Under Tiberius the Sava valley was brought under Roman control during the Pannonian War. (Note: The chronology of the conquest is debated. Alka Domić Kunić places the decisive subjugation of southern Pannonia in 12 to 11 BC, within the wider bellum Pannonicum that is more traditionally dated to between 13 and 9 BC.) The army reached the Danube between the mouths of the Drava and the Sava, and the Breuci, with their centres at Cibalae and Marsonia, were subdued together with the Amantini, while the Scordisci sided with Rome. After his victory Tiberius sold many of the young Pannonians into slavery..

=== Pannonian–Dalmatian revolt ===
In 6 AD, as Tiberius prepared to march against Maroboduus, king of the Marcomanni, the Pannonians and Dalmatians rose in revolt. The rising was provoked by the demand to levy auxiliary troops for the German campaign and by the burden of Roman taxation, and it was led by Bato of the Daesitiates together with another Bato who commanded the Breuci, alongside Pinnes. Among the peoples between the Sava and the Drava, only the Breuci joined the revolt.

The Pannonians attacked Sirmium and the Dalmatians Salona. The Breucian Bato advanced on Sirmium but was driven off by Caecina Severus, who came up with troops from Moesia, while the Daesitiate Bato, after a defeat by Messalla, joined forces with him. In AD 7 a Roman army was almost destroyed in the marshes of the Hiulca palus. Tiberius massed a large army at Siscia and campaigned against the Breuci in the region of the mons Claudius, laying the country waste.

Exhausted by hunger and disease, the Breuci surrendered on the river Bathinus on 3 August AD 8, a date preserved in the Fasti Antiates. Tiberius made their leader Bato a king, and Bato in turn seized Pinnes and handed him over to the Romans. The arrangement did not hold. The Daesitiate Bato attacked the Breucian Bato, the Breuci rose again and gave up their king to be killed, and this renewed revolt was crushed by Plautius Silvanus in AD 8, while the war in Dalmatia continued until AD 9.

=== Aftermath ===
The Tiberian settlement that followed the revolt was severe and broke up the former dominance of the Breuci. Their wide territory was dismembered, and the units into which it was divided were renamed after places and rivers rather than after the tribe. The Breuci were reorganised as a civitas peregrina under their own principes.

In the Julio-Claudian period the Breuci supplied very many auxiliaries. Their civitas was never raised to municipal rank, even under Hadrian, when municipia were founded in the territories of many Pannonian peoples, and, unlike the Azali or the Eravisci, no second-century military diplomas were issued to Breuci. The spread of Roman citizenship among them is first attested under Trajan, with members of the Ulpii of native origin.

== Auxiliary units ==
The scale of recruitment from the Breuci after the conquest was exceptional. No fewer than eight cohorts (cohortes I–VIII Breucorum) were raised, in addition to infantry and cavalry units that bore the name of the tribe. This heavy military service left the Breuci by far the best represented of the southern Pannonian peoples in the surviving inscriptions, even though only a few epigraphic monuments come from their own territory. Breucian soldiers are attested in places as far apart as the Rhineland, North Africa, southern Gaul and Dacia, where one appears on a wax tablet.
