= Amantini =

Illyrian tribe

The Amantini (Ancient Greek: Ἄμαντες; Latin: Amantinii) was the name of a Pannonian Illyrian tribe.

== Name ==
An inscription found in Bassianae which mentions the death of the ten-year old boy Scemaes is the only inscription which directly refers to the Amantini. Scemaes, son of Liccaus from the Undia family of the Amantini has been taken hostage by the Romans most probably during the Pannonian War. Young Scemaes drowned in a river near Emona by accident. His father Liccaus and his kinsmen Loriqus and Licaios dedicated an inscription and a cenotaph to his memory.

== Geography ==
The Amantini have been located between the rivers Drava and Sava, close to Sirmium.

== History ==
They remained outside the Roman sphere of influence before the Pannonian War (12–9 BCE) in which they fought against the Romans in alliance with other Illyrian peoples of Dalmatia and Pannonia. After the war and the Bellum Batonianum (6–9 CE) many of the youths of the leading Amantini families were taken hostages and many young males were sold as slaves in Italy.

== Bibliography ==
- Mesihović, Salmedin; Šačić, Amra (2015). Historija Ilira [History of Illyrians] (in Bosnian). Sarajevo: Univerzitet u Sarajevu [University of Sarajevo]. ISBN 978-9958-600-65-4.
- Šašel Kos, Marjeta (2005). Appian and Illyricum. Narodni Muzej Slovenije. ISBN 978-961-6169-36-3.
- Parat, Josip (2020). "Augustus and the Introduction of Epigraphic Habit to Pannonia" (PDF). Augustus immortalis. Aktuelle Forschungen zum Princeps im interdisziplinären Diskurs, Beiträge des interdisziplinären Symposions an der Humboldt-Universität zu Berlin, 25.–27. Oktober 2019.
- Wilkes, John J. (1992). The Illyrians. Oxford, United Kingdom: Blackwell Publishing. ISBN 0-631-19807-5.
