= Sotin =

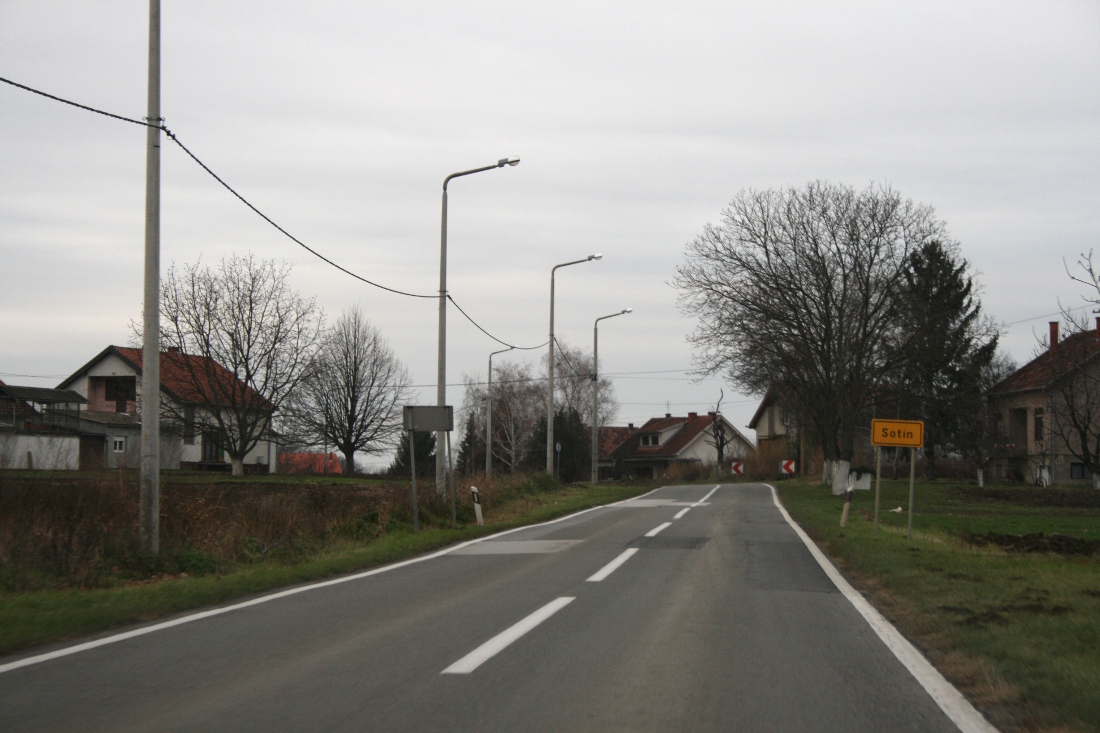

- Location of Sotin in Croatia Sotin (Croatia) Sotin (Europe)
- Coordinates: 45.295°N 19.097°E
- Country: Croatia
- County: Vukovar-Syrmia County

Area
  - Total: 23.0 km^{2} (8.9 sq mi)

Population (2021)
  - Total: 597
  - Density: 26.0/km^{2} (67.2/sq mi)
- Demonym(s): Sotinjanin (♂) Sotinjanka (♀) (per grammatical gender)

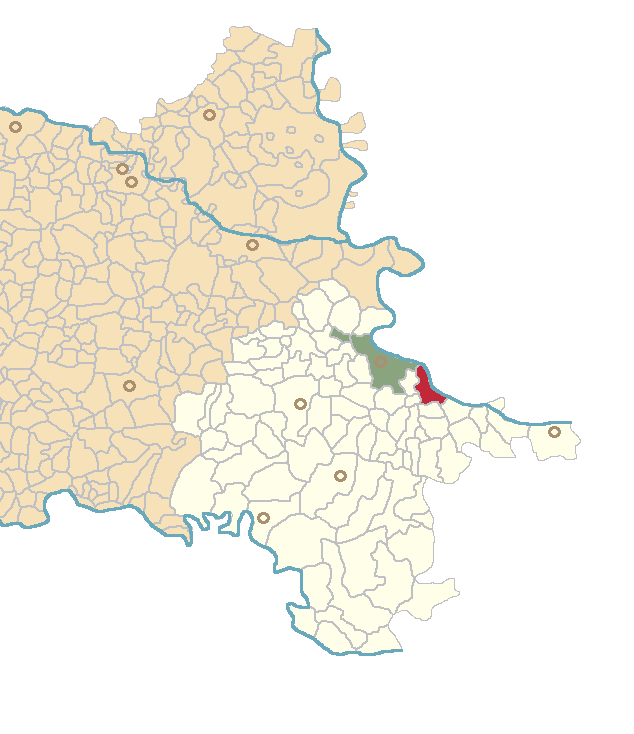
Sotin map

Sotin is a village in eastern Croatia, located a few kilometers southeast of Vukovar by the Danube. It is administratively part of the city of Vukovar, and its population is 597 (census 2021). The post code for Sotin is 32232 Sotin.

== History ==
One Scordisci archaeological site dating back to late La Tène culture was excavated in the 1970s and 1980s as a part of rescue excavations in eastern Croatia.

Sotin (German Sotting, Hungarian Szottin) was first mentioned in 1289 as a fortress of the Vukovar jobagions. In Sotin, there is an archaeological site with a settlement of the Pannonian Kornakata tribe. Archaeological finds speak of life in the Sotin area from the Copper Age to the Younger Iron Age and the Celtic Skordisks.

Following Ottoman retreat from the region, the Lordship of Vukovar was established, and the village became part of its domain.

=== Croatian War of Independence ===
During the Croatian War of Independence, 32 residents of Sotin were killed and another 32 are missing as of 2013. A mass grave containing three bodies was discovered near the village through information obtained by Serbian authorities conducting a criminal inquest of war crimes—killing of 16 Croatian civilians in Sotin—committed by the Croatian Serb militia and Territorial Defense Forces in late 1991. In April 2013, the second mass grave was found in the village. It contained ten bodies transferred from the mass grave containing the three other bodies to a village slaughterhouse pit where animal bones were disposed of at the time. The move was made in 1997 in order to hide the bodies better. All thirteen, whose remains were found in the two graves, were killed on 26 December 1991. Two other mass graves were found previously, one at the Catholic graveyard in the village and the other in nearby vineyards.
