= Marcus Valerius Messalla Messallinus =

Roman senator

- Spouse: Claudia Marcella Minor (possibly)
- Children: Valeria Messallia
- Parents: Marcus Valerius Messalla Corvinus (father); Calpurnia (mother)

Marcus Valerius Messalla Messallinus (also spelled as Messalinus, c. 36 BC – after AD 21) was a Roman senator who was elected consul for 3 BC.

== Early life ==
Messallinus was born and raised in Rome. He was the oldest son of the senator, orator and literary patron Marcus Valerius Messalla Corvinus (whom he resembled in character) and his wife Calpurnia. Messallinus is known to have had at least one sister, Valeria, who married the senator Titus Statilius Taurus. From his father's second marriage, his younger paternal half-brother was the senator Marcus Aurelius Cotta Maximus Messalinus. Messallinus was the great-uncle of Lollia Paulina, the third wife of Caligula, and a relation to Statilia Messalina, the third wife of Nero.

== Career ==
The poet Albius Tibullus mentions that Messallinus was admitted into the quindecimviri sacris faciundis, the collegium in charge of the Sibylline Books. Syme notes that the date of Messallinus' admission was before the poet's death in 19 BC, and argues the admission was in 21 BC. He served as a consul in 3 BC.

In AD 6, Messallinus served as a governor in Illyricum. During his time in Illyricum, he served with Tiberius with distinction in a campaign against the Pannonians and Dalmatians in the uprising of the Great Illyrian Revolt with the half-strength Legio XX Valeria Victrix. Messallinus defeated the Pannonii, led by Bato the Daesitiate, and prevented the spreading of the uprising. For his defeat over Bato, Messallinus was rewarded with a triumphal decoration (ornamenta triumphalia) and a place in the procession during Tiberius’ Pannonian triumph in AD 12, four years after the death of his father.

In the first session of the Senate after Tiberius ascended to the imperial throne in AD 14, Messallinus suggested that an oath of allegiance should be sworn to the emperor yearly. Tiberius declined this offer, then asked if this motion was his own idea. Messallinus replied that it was a spontaneous suggestion, meant to show public spirit, even at the risk of his own safety. He next appears in history six years later, in AD 20, as part of the outcome of the trial and execution of Gnaeus Calpurnius Piso. Tacitus notes that Messallinus, along with Caecina Severus, proposed a golden statue be placed in the temple of Mars the Avenger, and an altar dedicated to Vengeance, in celebration of the execution of Piso. Emperor Tiberius blocked the motion, pointing out that victories over foreign powers were commemorated with such acts, but domestic conflicts should be shrouded in silent grief. Messallinus was recorded as also proposing that public thanks be given to Tiberius and other individuals for having avenged Germanicus. When Lucius Nonius Asprenas pointedly asked if Messallinus had intentionally omitted all mention of Claudius in his proposal, the future emperor was then added. Messallinus also appears as one of seven witnesses of the Senatus consultum de Cn. Pisone patre, the Roman Senate's official act concerning the trial and punishment of Piso.

The last time Tacitus mentions Messallinus is in his account of AD 21, when he spoke against a motion before the Senate to forbid senators from bringing their wives with them when leaving to govern a province. Syme hints that Messallinus died not long after, noting that Tacitus provided no obituary notice for the senator, concluding that "the oration did service as a conspicuous exit."

== Literature ==
Tibullus is not the only poet to mention Messallinus. From his exile at Tomis, the poet Ovid addressed as many as three poems to him. Ovid's Tristia comprises poems written during his travel into exile, and his first years at Tomis, none of which mention names. Syme explains this omission "ostensibly to avoid embarrassment". Despite this, Syme is confident that one of the poems in Tristia (IV.4) is addressed to Messalinus. After beginning with a compliment to noble birth, to noble character, and to eloquence inherited from his father, Ovid pleads with Messalinus to intervene with Augustus to recall him from exile.

The next other two poems are part of his three-book collection titled Epistulae ex Ponto ("Letters from the Black Sea"), in elegiacs like Tristia, but providing the names of the addressees of the poems unlike Tristia. Syme dates the first poem (I.7) to AD 12, and the second (II.2) to the following year. Both repeat Ovid's pleas for help to be recalled from Tomis. "The three pieces to his address fail to disclose any close personal relationship, common acquaintances, or liking for poetry," Syme observes, and contrasts this to Ovid's relationship with Messalinus' brother Cotta Maximus. "Ovid knew him from the cradle (Ex P. II.3.72), he mentions in 11 his wife and new-born son (Tr. IV.5.27ff)."

== Family ==
Messallinus' daughter Valeria Messallia was born c. 10 BC (her mother might have been Claudia Marcella Minor) and later married the praetor of AD 17, Lucius Vipstanus Gallus. In the next generation two Vipstani are known, with the cognomina "Messalla" and "Poplicola". This led Ronald Syme to observe that either Lucius or Marcus Vipstanus Gallus married a daughter of Marcus Valerius Messalla Messallinus and Claudia Marcella Minor, who is named (for convenience) Valeria Messallia. This alliance with the gens Valeria led to the prominence of the family during the first centuries of the Roman Empire. According to the French historian Christian Settipani, after the death of her husband Paullus Aemilius Lepidus, Marcella married the Roman Senator Marcus Valerius Messalla Messallinus. Marcella bore Messallinus a daughter called Valeria Messallia, born ca. 10 BC, who later married the praetor of 17, Lucius Vipstanus Gallus. However, Messallinus (son of Corvinus) was younger than Marcella. That fact does not prevent the marriage, but makes it unlikely, given Roman tradition.

== Sources ==
- Marcus Velleius Paterculus - 2.112.1-2
- Tacitus - The Annals of Imperial Rome
- Suetonius - The Lives of the Twelve Caesars
- Cassius Dio, 55.30.1-5.
- A. Tibullus, The Complete Poems of Tibullus: An En Face Bilingual Edition, University of California Press, 2012
- A. M. Juster, Elegies: With parallel Latin text (Google eBook), Oxford University Press, 2012
- Velleius Paterculus – Translated with Introduction and Notes by J.C. Yardley & A.A. Barrett, The Roman History, Hackett Publishing, 2011
- M. Gagarin & E. Fantham, The Oxford Encyclopedia of Ancient Greece and Rome: Academy Bible, Oxford University Press, 2009
- V. Paterculus, Paterculus: The Tiberian Narrative, Cambridge University Press, 2004
- Ronald Syme, The Augustan Aristocracy, Oxford University Press, 1989

Political offices
| Preceded by Gaius Calvisius Sabinus; Lucius Passienus Rufus; Gaius Caelius; Galus Sulpicius | Roman consul 3 BC with Lucius Cornelius Lentulus | Succeeded by Augustus XIII; M. Plautius Silvanus |
