= Bellum Batonianum =

AD 6–9 revolt in Roman province of Illyricum

Bellum Batonianum (Illyrian revolt)
- Map of the uprising
| Date | AD 6–9 |
| Location | Illyricum |
| Result | Roman victory; Illyrian surrender in 9 AD |
| Territorial changes | Status quo ante bellum |

Belligerents
| Illyrian Tribes: Daesitiates; Breuci; Dalmatae; Andizetes; Pannonians; Pirustae; Liburnians; Iapydes | Roman Empire; Odrysian Kingdom |

Commanders and leaders
| Bato the Daesitiate; Bato the Breucian (executed); Pinnes | Augustus; Tiberius; Valerius Messallinus; Aulus Caecina Severus; Germanicus; Marcus Plautius Silvanus; Marcus Aemilius Lepidus; Rhoemetalces I |

Strength
| Total: 209,000 200,000 infantry 9,000 cavalry | Total: 100,000 10–15 legions 70 auxiliary cohorts 15 alae Thracian allied cavalry Veterans, freedmen and volunteers from Italy; Classis Pannonica |

Casualties and losses
| over half of the army either killed or captured | Heavy |

The Bellum Batonianum (Latin for War of the Batos) or Great Illyrian Revolt was a military conflict fought in the Roman province of Illyricum in the 1st century AD, in which an alliance of native peoples of the two regions of Illyricum, Dalmatia and Pannonia, revolted against the Romans. The Roman historian Suetonius described the uprising as the most difficult conflict faced by Rome since the Punic Wars two centuries earlier.

The rebellion began among native peoples who had been recruited as auxiliary troops for the Roman army. They were led by Bato the Daesitiate, a chieftain of the Daesitiatae in the central part of present-day Bosnia and Herzegovina, and were later joined by the Breuci, a tribe in Pannonia led by Bato the Breucian. Many other tribes in Illyria also joined the revolt.

Velleius Paterculus called it the Pannonian and Dalmatian War because it involved both regions of Illyricum.

The four-year war lasted from AD 6 to AD 9 and witnessed a large deployment of Roman forces in the province, with whole armies operating across the western Balkans and fighting on more than one front. In AD 8, the Breuci of the Sava valley surrendered, but it took a winter blockade and another season of fighting before the surrender in Dalmatia in AD 9.

Bato the Breucian betrayed Pinnes which later became the Ruler of the Breucians by the Romans.

== Background ==
Illyricum had seen some fighting during the Great Roman Civil War between Julius Caesar and the forces of the Senate led by Pompey several decades earlier. The Romans who lived in some of the coastal towns supported Caesar, while the native peoples largely supported Pompey. Quintus Cornificius, a Caesarian, repulsed Quintus Octavius, a Pompeian. The Dalmatians routed Aulus Gabinius, a Caesarian who had been ordered by Caesar to join Cornificius in Illyricum. The Dalmatians later asked Caesar for a pardon. Caesar demanded a tribute and hostages as compensation, which was standard practice, and sent Publius Vatinius with three legions to enforce this. After Caesar was assassinated in 44 BC, the Dalmatians ignored these demands and routed five of Vatinius' cohorts. With the disruptions caused by further Roman civil wars in the years following, Dalmatian piracy in the Adriatic Sea became a problem again.

In 35 BC, the Iapydes, the northernmost tribe of Dalmatia, carried out raids into northeastern Italy. They attacked Aquileia, and plundered Tergestus (Trieste). From 35 to 33 BC Octavian (who would soon become the emperor Augustus) undertook military campaigns in the region. He defeated the Iapydes and then pushed into southern Pannonia, where he seized the city of Segesta (which later, as a Roman town, was called Siscia). He then turned on the Dalmatians and captured Promona (to the northeast of modern Drniš, Croatia) on the coast, the main city of the Liburnians, which had been seized by the Dalmatians. After that he took the Dalmatian cities of Sunodium and Setovia. He then moved upon the Derbani, who sued for peace. He also destroyed the settlements on the islands of Melite (Mljet) and Melaina Corcyra (Korčula), and deprived the Liburnians of their ships, because all were involved in piracy. Octavian's lieutenants conducted various other operations in the region. Octavian temporarily restored Roman authority in Dalmatia and pushed into southern Pannonia, which had never before been reached by Roman armies.

In 27 BC, the first settlement between Octavian and the Roman Senate formalised Octavian's absolute rule, bestowing the title of Augustus on him and making him the first Roman emperor. It also made arrangements about the provinces of the empire. Most provinces remained senatorial provinces, whose governors were chosen by the Senate from among the senators, while the frontier provinces became imperial provinces, whose governors were appointed by Augustus. The province of Illyricum was constituted out of both Dalmatia and the newly conquered southern Pannonia, and, despite being a frontier province, was designated as a senatorial province.

From 14 BC to 10 BC there were a series of rebellions in southern Pannonia and northern Dalmatia which Roman writers referred to as Bellum Pannonicum (the "Pannonian War"). What little is known about these events comes chiefly from brief accounts by Cassius Dio and a few references by other authors, though there is no information about the causes. The Roman sources had little interest in events in Illyria from the campaigns of Augustus in 35–33 BC to 16 BC. Cassius Dio wrote that in that year the governor of Illyria for 17–16 BC, Publius Silius Nerva, went to fight in the Italian Alps because there were no troops there. Some Pannonians and Noricans entered Istria and pillaged it. Silius Nerva quickly brought the situation under control. At the same time there was a small rebellion in Dalmatia. The Dentheletae, together with the Scordisci, who lived in present-day Serbia at the confluence of the Rivers Savus (Sava), Dravus (Drava), and Danube, attacked the Roman province of Macedonia. A civil war broke out in Thrace. In 15 BC the Romans conquered the Scordisci and annexed Noricum and conducted other operations in other parts of the Alps against the Rhaeti and Vindelici. In 13 BC, Augustus gave Marcus Vipsanius Agrippa, his most important ally, the supreme command in Illyricum. Agrippa found a negotiated solution; however, he died suddenly and the treaty was ignored. Command was then given to Tiberius, who finally defeated the Illyrians. Roman military operations in Illyricum might have started by the time of Marcus Vinicius' governorship in 14–13 BC. The Pannonian War led to Illyricum being redesignated an imperial province.

== The war ==
=== Indigenous alliance and Roman forces ===
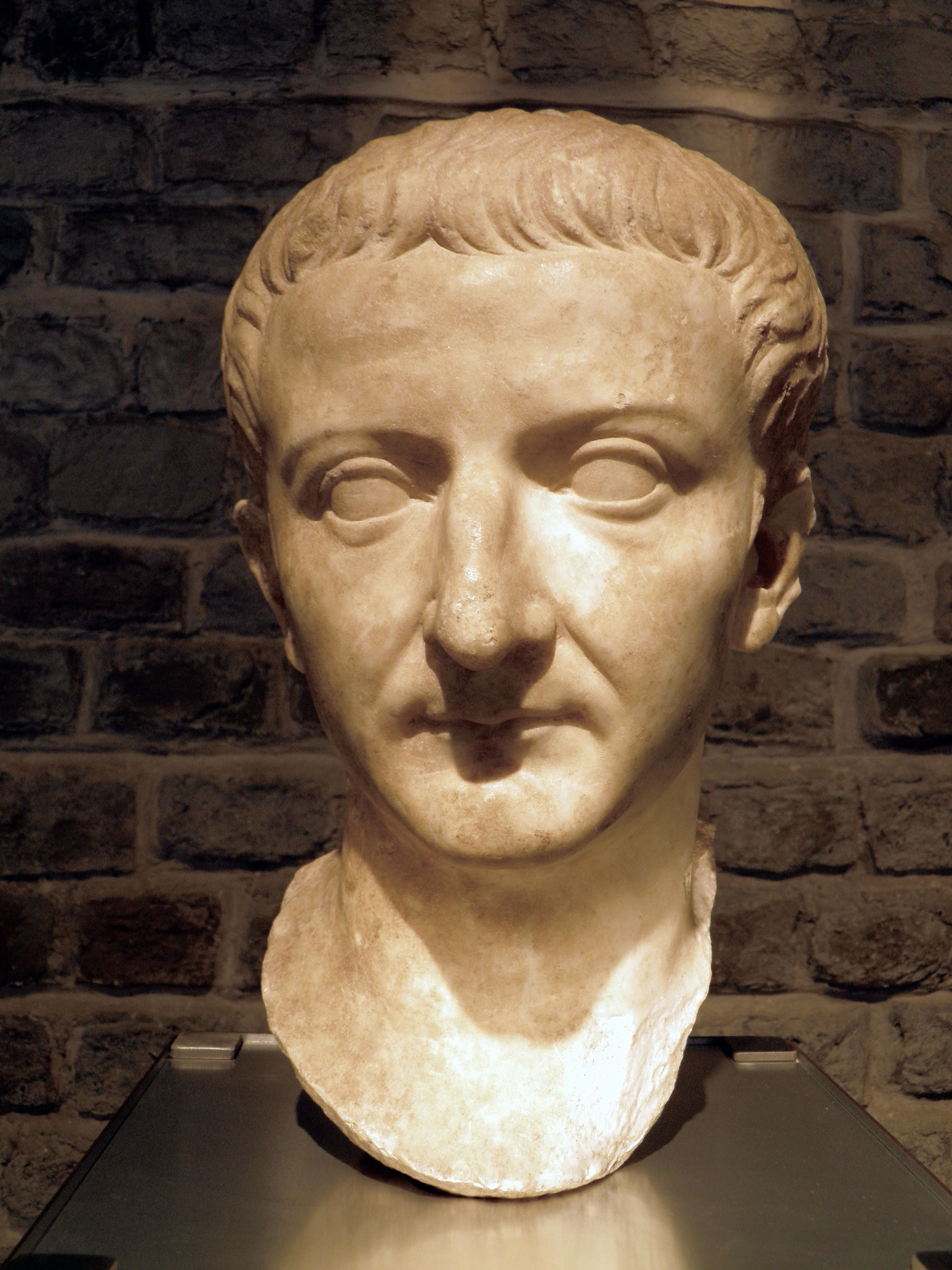
Tiberius

The Great Illyrian Revolt of AD 6–9 was the only occasion on which the different peoples in the province of Illyricum united against the Romans. The main tribes which contributed to the alliance were the Daesitiatae, Breuci, Dalmatae, Andizetes, Pannonians, Pirustae, Liburnians, and Iapydes (the latter two fighting under an unknown leader). The Dalmatians were led by Bato the Daesitiate, while the Breuci were led by Bato the Breucian, their army commander, and Pinnes, their king. The primary sources of this information are Cassius Dio and Velleius Paterculus. The latter participated in the war but supplied limited information. Suetonius also gave a description of the war: "the most serious of all foreign wars since those with Carthage, which [Tiberius] carried on for three years with fifteen legions and a corresponding force of auxiliaries, amid great difficulties of every kind and the utmost scarcity of supplies."

Suetonius' claim about fifteen legions is known to be incorrect. At one point there were ten legions assembled in Illyricum, but five of them were sent back because this would have created an oversized army. On three occasions the three legions from the Roman province of Moesia were involved in the fighting and on one occasion two legions from the Roman province of Asia were also involved. Through most of the war it was the five legions stationed in Illyricum (three in Pannonia and two in Dalmatia) which were engaged in this war, which covered a very large area. In addition, there were irregular emergency units levied in Italy. The rebels had an efficient military organisation which paralleled that of the Romans, given that they had previously served in Roman-trained auxiliary military units. However, they did not have a regular army and relied largely upon guerrilla tactics, avoiding pitched battles. There were only three major battles in the area of Sirmium (Sremska Mitrovica, in modern Serbia), in nearby northern Moesia, and a number of minor battles in Dalmatia. Much of the Roman war effort instead involved counter-insurgency operations.

=== AD 6: Outbreak of the rebellion and first year of the war ===
In AD 6, Tiberius was about to launch the second campaign against the Marcomanni in Germania. Marcus Valerius Messalla Messallinus, the governor of Illyricum, had planned to join him with most of his army, and ordered the local tribes to provide auxiliary contingents. However, when these troops gathered, they rebelled under the leadership of a Daesitiate tribal chieftain named Bato and defeated a Roman force sent against them. Although this war is sometimes described as having been fought by the Daesitiatae and the Breuci only, Cassius Dio identified the forces led by Bato the Daesitiate as Dalmatian, indicating a broader composition. According to Velleius Paterculus, the population of the tribes which rebelled was more than 800,000, and they fielded 200,000 infantry and 9,000 cavalry. Modern scholars cannot be certain of how trustworthy this information is, as ancient historians tended to exaggerate figures. Velleius Paterculus also wrote that the rebels knew Roman military tactics and spoke Latin.

The rebels divided their forces into three parts. One was to invade Italy, which was not far from Nauportus (a Roman fort in present-day Slovenia); one had already entered the Roman province of Macedonia (present-day Greece); and the third fought in their home territories. They executed their plan swiftly, massacring Roman civilians and a sizable veteran contingent who were helpless in this remote area. They seized and pillaged Macedonia, creating general panic in Rome. Augustus, also alarmed, ordered a general levy, and recalled veterans. Rich families were ordered to supply freedmen in proportion to their income, which had not been done since the aftermath of the Battle of Cannae two centuries earlier. Augustus warned that the rebels could reach Rome in ten days if drastic action was not taken. He assigned command of the war to Tiberius. The Roman army was organized into several divisions to evade the united forces of the rebels. Outposts were placed to prevent them from breaking through to Rome, as well as to disrupt their supply lines.

In Cassius Dio's version, at first, Bato the Daesitiate had very few followers. However, once he defeated the Roman force sent against him, more rebels joined him. Then the Breuci, the largest tribe in southern Pannonia, led by a commander also named Bato, marched on Sirmium. Aulus Caecina Severus, the governor of the neighbouring province of Moesia (in modern Serbia, south of the River Sava and west of the River Danube) quickly advanced against them and defeated them near the River Dravus (Drava), but suffered many casualties. Hoping to renew the struggle soon because many Romans had fallen, the Breuci called on their allies to join them. Cassius Dio did not specify whether Severus broke a siege of the city or prevented the enemy from reaching it. The Drava was to the northwest of Sirmium and the Romans from Moesia must have come from the east or the south. Thus, if Caecina Severus did break a siege of Sirmium, he would have pursued the retreating Breuci until they made a last stand. The Dalmatians marched on Salona (in Dalmatia, on the Adriatic coast) but there Bato was defeated and wounded. He sent other men forward who ravaged the coast down to Apollonia. They were defeated in one battle, but won another. Tiberius came from Germania, fearing an invasion of Italy, and sent Valerius Messallinus ahead. Even though Bato was not well, he engaged Tiberius. Tiberius was stronger in open battle, but he was defeated in an ambush. Velleius Paterculus wrote that Messallinus was surrounded by 20,000 men and had only one legion at only half its normal strength (roughly 2,500 men), yet he routed the enemy and was awarded a triumphal decoration (ornamenta triumphalia) and a place in the procession during Tiberius’ Pannonian triumph. Presumably Valerius Messallinus was then sent to defend Salona.

According to Cassius Dio, Bato the Daesitiate went east to the other Bato and made an alliance with him. This contrasts with the picture given by Velleius Paterculus, in which the rebellion seemed to have a plan and the Dalmatians and the Breuci seemed to have acted in concert from the beginning. In Dio's account the two Batos occupied Mount Alma (Mount Fruška Gora, Serbia, just north of Sirmium); here they were defeated by the Thracian cavalry of Rhoemetalces (the king of the Odrysian Kingdom in Thrace, an ally of the Romans) which had been sent ahead against them by Caecina Severus, the governor of Moesia. They then fought hard against Severus, who later went back to Moesia because the Dacians and Sarmatians had crossed the Danube and were ravaging it. Tiberius and Valerius Messallinus lingered in Siscia (Sisak, in present-day central Croatia, the headquarters of the Roman army). The Dalmatians overran the territory of the Roman allies and drew many more tribes into the revolt. Tiberius marched on them, but they avoided pitched battles and kept moving around, causing great devastation. In the winter the rebels invaded Macedonia again. Cassius Dio wrote that they did so again even though he had not mentioned a previous invasion of Macedonia. Modern scholars know about this through the writing of Velleius Paterculus (as noted above). They were defeated by Rhoemetalces and his brother Rhascyporis. Dio did not mention any action by the Romans there. Therefore, it is unknown how the Roman governor of this province dealt with the situation; it is also unknown how the previous invasion was dealt with. It might have involved raids, rather than an occupation.

=== AD 7: Germanicus sent to Illyricum; troops from Moesia and Asia sent back ===
Cassius Dio wrote that in AD 7, Augustus sent Tiberius' nephew Germanicus to Illyricum because Tiberius’ lack of activity made him suspicious that Tiberius was intentionally delaying the war so as to remain under arms as long as possible. Augustus seems to have been displeased with what he must have considered a passive strategy. However, Tiberius was very active and was conducting a war of attrition and counter-insurgency operations. This strategy later proved to be the right one.

Germanicus was given a force of freemen and freedmen. Some of the latter were requisitioned from their masters, who were compensated. In Rome there was a shortage of grain. Velleius Paterculus wrote that the rebel forces in Pannonia who faced Tiberius were not happy with the size of their forces. They were worn down and brought to the verge of famine (presumably due to ravaging), could not withstand his offensives, and avoided pitched battles. They went to the Claudian Mountains (a mountain range in Pannonia, in Varaždin County in northern Croatia) and took a defensive position in the natural fortifications. In Velleius Paterculus’ version, the second rebel force confronted the legions which Caecina Severus and Marcus Plautius Silvanus were bringing to Illyricum (from Moesia and the Roman province of Asia, three and two legions respectively). They surrounded the five legions, their auxiliary troops, and the Thracian cavalry and almost inflicted a fatal defeat. The Thracian cavalry was routed and the allied cavalry fled. The legions suffered casualties, but they then rallied and won the day. Cassius Dio's version does not mention Plautius Silvanus; instead, the two Batos went to wait for the arrival of Caecina Severus. They attacked him unexpectedly when he was encamped near the Volcaean marshes, but Severus repulsed the attack. Following this battle the Roman army was divided into detachments to overrun as many parts of the country as possible at once. In Dio's opinion, at this time they did not accomplish anything worthy of note, except for Germanicus defeating the Mazaei, a Dalmatian tribe. In an earlier passage he noted that in this year the country was ravaged and that the rebels did not defend it. They withdrew to mountain fortresses from which they launched raids whenever they could. Therefore, even though there were no spectacular battles (by which the Romans judged military worthiness), Tiberius' counter-insurgency campaign and its accompanying scorched earth strategy turned out to be effective.

After the aforementioned battle, Aulus Caecina Severus and Marcus Plautius Silvanus joined Tiberius and a huge army was assembled. Velleius Paterculus reported that they brought five legions (three from Moesia and two from the province of Asia, respectively). Tiberius had five legions (three in Pannonia and two in Dalmatia). The legions were not at full strength as Velleius Paterculus mentioned that there were seventy cohorts (ten legions at full complement would have had 100 cohorts). There were fourteen troops of cavalry, as well as 10,000 reservists, many volunteers, and the Thracian cavalry. There had not been such a large army gathered in a single location since the time of the Roman civil wars. Tiberius decided to escort the newly arrived armies back because the army was too large to be manageable. He then returned to Siscia at the beginning of a very hard winter.

=== AD 8: End of the rebellion in Pannonia ===
In AD 8, the Dalmatians and the Pannonians, ravaged by famine and disease, wanted to sue for peace but were prevented from doing so by the rebels, who had no hope of being spared by the Romans and so continued to resist. Tiberius had pursued a policy of scorched earth to starve the Pannonians. Cassius Dio also noted that there were grain shortages in Rome the previous year and that later in this year the famine abated. It is not known how widespread this famine was and whether it touched other Mediterranean areas, including Dalmatia and Pannonia, and thus had been a contributory factor. According to Dio, Bato the Breucian overthrew Pinnes, the king of the Breuci. He became suspicious of his subject tribes and demanded hostages from the Pannonian garrisons. Bato the Daesitiate defeated him in battle and pinned him in a stronghold. He was handed over to Bato the Daesitiate and was executed. After this many Pannonians broke with the rebels. Marcus Plautius Silvanus conducted a campaign against the tribes, conquered the Breuci, and won over the others without a battle. Bato the Daesitiate subsequently withdrew from Pannonia, occupied the passes leading to Dalmatia, and ravaged the lands beyond. In Pannonia there was some brigandage. Velleius Paterculus wrote that the harsh winter brought rewards because in the following summer all of Pannonia sought peace. Therefore, a bad winter probably also played a part. The Pannonians laid down their arms at the River Bathinus. Bato was captured and Pinnes surrendered.

=== End of the rebellion ===
In AD 9, the war was restricted to Dalmatia. Velleius Paterculus wrote that Augustus gave the chief command of all Roman forces to Marcus Aemilius Lepidus. In the summer, Lepidus made his way to Tiberius through areas which had not been affected by the war, and was attacked by fresh local forces. Lepidus defeated them, ravaged the fields, and burnt houses, later reaching Tiberius. This campaign ended the war. Two Dalmatian tribes, the Pirustae and Daesitiatae, who had been almost unconquerable because of their mountain strongholds, the narrow passes in which they lived, and their fighting spirit, were almost exterminated.

Cassius Dio, instead, wrote that Tiberius returned to Rome. Germanicus was unable to take the well-fortified Splonum by storm. However, when a parapet of the wall fell, the inhabitants panicked, abandoning that part of the wall and fleeing to the citadel, where they eventually surrendered. At Raetinum the inhabitants set a slow-burning fire. When the Romans entered the town they did not notice it and then found themselves surrounded by the flames and pelted from the wall of the citadel, most of them dying in the trap. The people in the citadel had to escape to subterranean chambers in the night. Germanicus then seized Seretium and then the other places fell easily. However, other Dalmatians revolted.

Cassius Dio also wrote that there was famine in Italy largely due to the war. However, most of the grain was imported from Egypt, the province of Africa, Sicily, and Sardinia. Therefore, it is unclear how the war in Illyricum caused famine in Italy. Augustus sent Tiberius back to Dalmatia. Tiberius split the army into three divisions to avoid a mutiny. He put Marcus Plautius Silvanus and Marcus Aemilius Lepidus in charge of two of them and led the third against Bato, taking Germanicus with him. The other two divisions easily defeated their enemies. Tiberius chased the fugitive Bato around the country, and finally besieged him at Adetrium, near Salona. This was on a rock and was surrounded by steep ravines. Tiberius held on until Bato was forced to seek terms. However, Bato could not persuade his comrades to accept a truce. Tiberius advanced against the fortress, keeping part of his force in reserve and sending the rest forward in a square formation. The rugged terrain stretched the advancing troops. On seeing this, the Dalmatians lined up outside the wall at the top of the slope and hurled stones at them, separating the Romans further. Tiberius prevented his men from retreating by continuously sending reinforcements. He sent a detachment to a point where the place could be ascended via a long route. Once it had been taken, the enemy could not enter the fortress and fled. They were later found hiding in the forest and were killed. Tiberius then negotiated the terms of capitulation.

Germanicus turned his attention to the last holdouts in Arduba, a strongly fortified town with a river around its base. Within the town, there was tension between rebel deserters who wanted to carry on the fight and the inhabitants who wanted peace, which eventually developed into violence. The women reportedly helped the deserters because, contrary to their men, they did not want to suffer servitude. The deserters were defeated and surrendered. The women took their children and threw themselves into the flames or the river below. Cassius Dio did not specify what caused the fire. The nearby towns surrendered voluntarily. Germanicus rejoined Tiberius, and sent Gaius Vibius Postumus to subdue the other districts. Bato promised to surrender if he and his followers would be pardoned. Tiberius agreed and then asked him why his people had rebelled. According to Cassius Dio, he replied: "You Romans are to blame for this; for you send as guardians of your flocks, not dogs or shepherds, but wolves."

=== Aftermath ===
The Romans finally managed to stabilize the area. During the war, split Illyrian tribes into different groups from the ones they had previously composed. The administrative civitates of the Osseriates, Colapiani, and Varciani were probably created from the Breuci. Other members of tribes were probably sold as slaves or deported to different locations, such as the Azali.

== See also ==
- Illyrian warfare
- Bato
- Auxiliaries (Roman military)#Illyrian revolt (6–9 AD)
- Illyrian coastal and Macedonian raids

== Bibliography ==
=== Primary sources ===
- Cassius Dio Roman History, Vol 6, Books. 51–65 (Loeb Classical Library), Loeb, 1989; ISBN 978-0674990920
- Suetonius, (the Life of Tiberius; The Life of The Twelve Caesars, Penguin Classics, revised edition, 2007;ISBN 978-0140455168 (Julius Caesar [10]) accessed July 2016
- Velleius Paterculus Compendium of Roman History / Res Gestae Divi Augusti (Loeb Classical Library, No. 152), 1867; Harvard University Press (1867); ASIN: B01JXR6R1Q

=== Secondary sources ===
- Gruen, E., S., The Expansion of the Empire under Augustus, in: A. K. Bowman, A., K., Champlin, E., Lintot, A., (eds.), The Cambridge Ancient History 10. The Augustan Empire, 43 B.C. – A.D. 69, Cambridge University Press, 1996, pp. 147–197; ISBN 978-0521264303
- Mócsy, A., Pannonia and Upper Moesia: A History of the Middle Danube Provinces of the Roman Empire (Routledge Revivals), Routledge, 2015; ISBN 978-0415745833
- Seager, R., Tiberius, Tiberius, (Blackwell Ancient Lives), Wiley-Blackwell; 2ND edition, 2005; ISBN 978-1405115292
- Radman-Livaja, I., Dizda, M., Archaeological Traces of the Pannonian Revolt 6–9 AD:Evidence and Conjectures, Veröffentlichungen der Altertumskommiion für Westfalen Landschaftsverband Westfalen-Lippe, Band XVIII, Aschendorff Verlag, 210, pp. 47–58
- Wilkes, J. J., The Danubian and Balkan Provinces, in: Bowman A., L., Champlin E., A.Lintot (eds.), The Cambridge Ancient History 10. The Augustan Empire, 43 B. C. – A. D. 69, Cambridge University Press, 1996, pp. 545–585; ISBN 978-0521264303
- Wilkes J.J., The Illyrians (The Peoples of Europe), Wiley-Blackwell; New Ed edition, 1996; ISBN 978-0631198079

Detailed and critical commentaries of the sources is given in:

- Šašel-Kos, M., A Historical Outline of the Region Between Aquileia, the Adriatic and Sirmium in Cassius Dio and Herodian (Ljubljana 1986), pp. 178–190.
- Swan, P., M, The Augustan Succession: a Historical Commentary on Cassius Dio's Roman History Books 55–56 (9 B.C. – A.D. 14). American Classical Studies 47, pp. 195–222, pp. 235–250. Oxford University Press, 2004; ISBN 978-0195167740
- A. J. Woodman, A.J., Velleius Paterculus: The Tiberian Narrative (2.94–131) (Cambridge Classical Texts and Commentaries), Cambridge University Press, 2004

Useful historical narratives of the events can be found in:

- Dzino, D. Illyricum in Roman Politics 229 BC – AD 68, Cambridge University Press, 2010, pp. 149–153; ISBN 978-0521194198
- Wilkes, J. J., Dalmatia, Harvard University Press, 1969; pp. 69–77. ISBN 978-0674189508
