= Bato the Breucian =

Illyrian chieftain

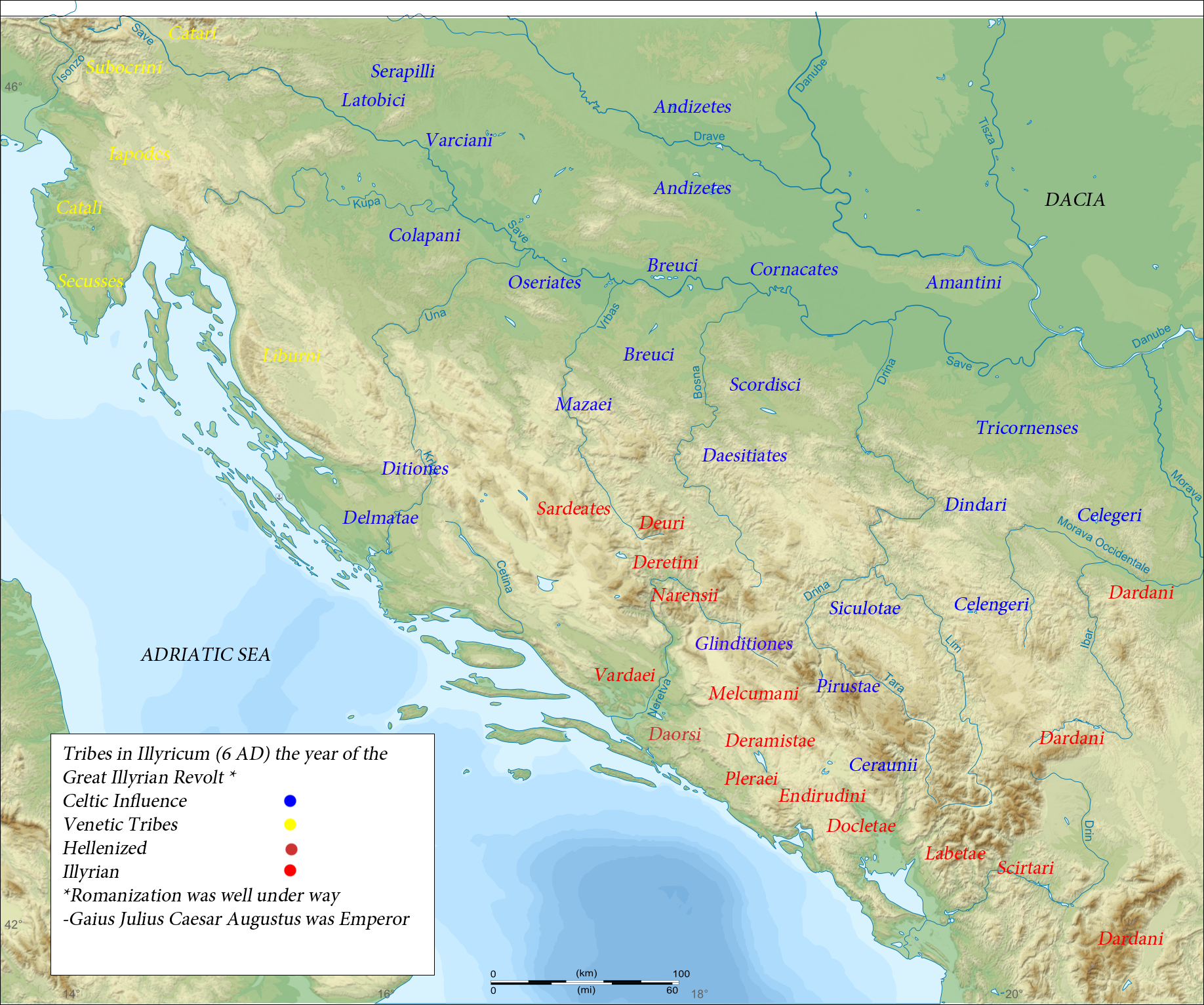
Tribes in Illyricum and environs in AD 6, the year of the Great Illyrian revolt, post Roman conquest

Bato the Breucian or Bato of the Breuci was the chieftain of the Breuci, an Illyrian tribe that fought against the Roman Empire in a war known as Bellum Batonianum. Bato joined his rebel forces with those led by Bato of the Daesitiates. After facing defeat, he surrendered to Tiberius in 8 AD on the bank of the Bosna river. Ultimately, Bato of the Breuci was captured by Bato of Daesitiates and was put to death after a decision was made by an assembly of the Daesitiates.

== See also ==
- List of rulers of Illyria
