= Daesitiates =

Illyrian tribe

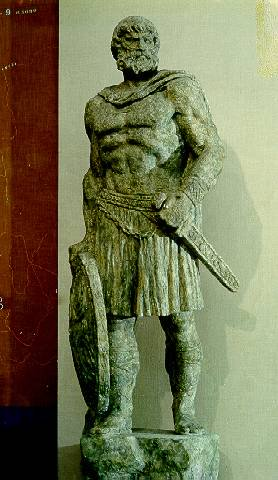
Bato the Daesitiate

Daesitiates were an Illyrian tribe that lived on the territory of today's central Bosnia, during the time of the Roman Republic. Along with the Maezaei, the Daesitiates were part of the western group of Pannonians in Roman Dalmatia. They were prominent from the end of the 4th century BC up until the beginning of the 3rd century CE. Evidence of their daily activities can be found in literary sources, as well as in the rich material finds from Central Bosnian cultural group that is commonly associated with tribe of Daesitiates.

== Etymology ==
The name is thought to be connected to the Illyrian word for ram.

== History ==
The Illyrian tribe Daesitiates lived in the territory of today's central Bosnia, during the time of the Roman Republic, and together with the Maezaei, they were part of the western group of Pannonians in Roman Dalmatia. Because the Daesitiates were present during Roman rule in the western Balkans, their name can be found in many inscriptions and historical works of ancient writers. During the 19th century, scientific interest in the Daesitiates materialized whereby research was focused in parts of Upper Bosnia. However, all research efforts have yet to provide a complete analysis of the Daesitiates. They were one of the main components of the Illyrian ethno-cultural complex that stretched from the southern Adriatic to the Danube in the north. The capital of the tribe could be in the modern-day town of Breza located in the central part of Bosnia. They developed a cohesive community that was characterized by clearly defined political, social, and economic structures. Because of their favorable geographical position and rich ore deposits and fertile land, they played a significant role among neighboring Illyrian tribes. They have developed a degree of cultural unity and several organized centers.

=== Roman Empire ===
After nearly three centuries of political independence, the Daesitiates (and their polity) were conquered by Roman Emperor Augustus. Afterwards, the Daesitiates were incorporated into the province of Illyricum with a low total of 103 decuriae. Ultimately, the widening gap between the Roman government and its subjects in Illyricum led to the Great Illyrian revolt, which began in the spring of 6 AD.

The Daesitiates were the first to revolt under the leadership of Bato the Daesitiate and were soon joined by the Breuci. Other natives were recruited to fight against the Marcomanni while the rebellion swiftly overtook enormous areas of the western Balkans and the Danube region. The four-year war, which lasted from AD 6 to 9, saw huge concentrations of Roman forces in the area, (on one occasion 10 legions and their auxiliaries in a single camp), with whole armies operating across the western Balkans and fighting on more than one front. The role of the Daesitiates in the rebellion was immense, which contributed to their ultimate disappearance in subsequent Romanization that followed. Their identity in the later antiquity was transformed into municipal identities and a provincial Dalmatian identity.

== Archeological sites ==
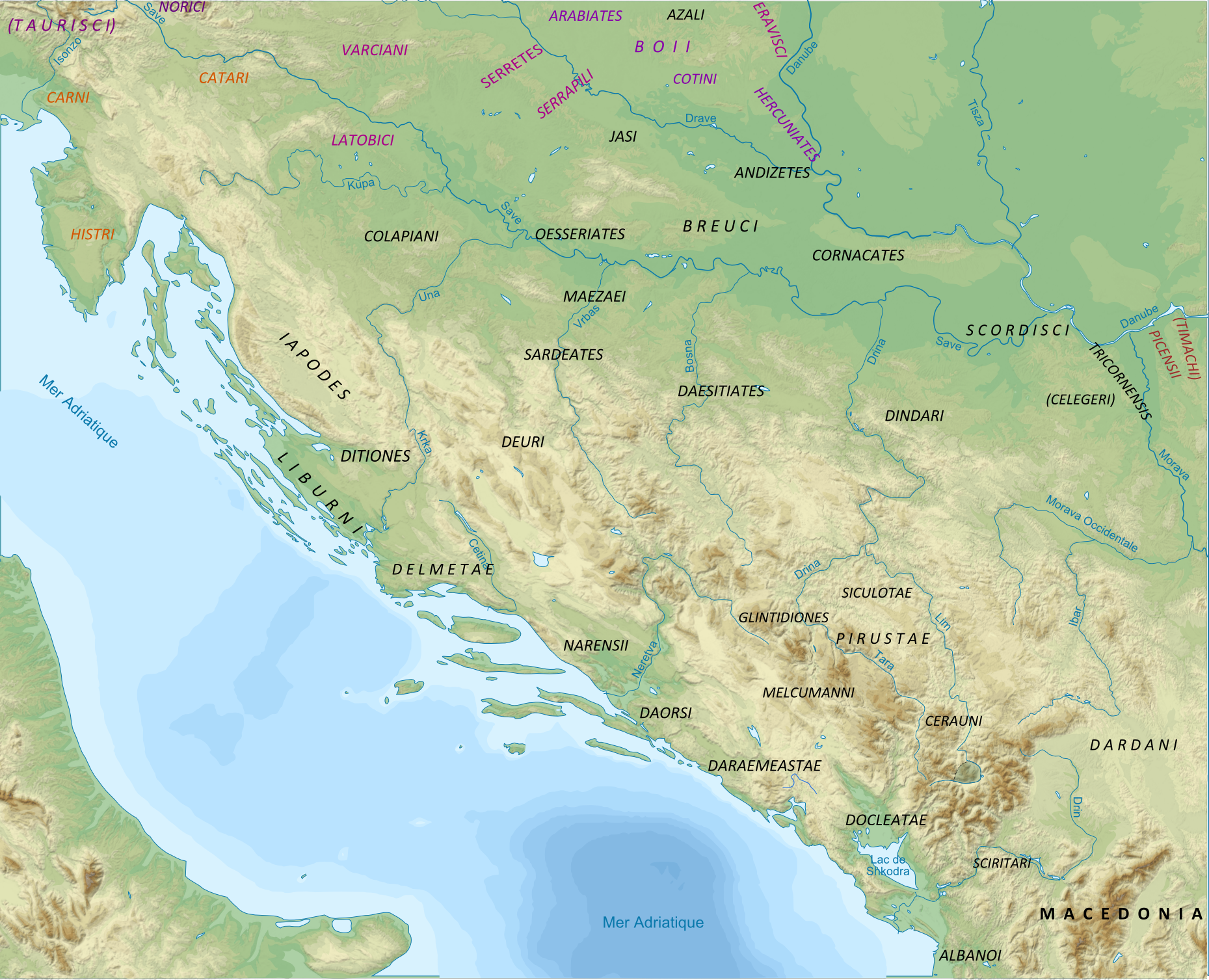
Tribes in Illyria and Lower Pannonia

Considerable number of remains of fortifications, villages and settlements were left behind. Some of them were partly investigated by archaeological excavations during which numerous necropolis and tombs were discovered such as fortifications in the Lašva Valley, Gradine near Kiseljak, Gradine in Sarajevo Field, archeological site of Kamenjak. However, most significant site was found in Bugojno, called Gradina Pod. It is characterized by urban-type settlements located close to large arable land complexes and contained high level of residential architecture.

== Bibliography ==
- Čović, Borivoj (1983), "Srednjobosanska kulturna grupa" [Central Bosnian cultural group], Bronzano doba. Praistorija jugoslavenskih zemalja [Bronze Age: Prehistory of Yugoslav Lands] (in Serbo-Croatian), vol. 4, Svjetlost, OCLC 165779683
- Andrijana Pravidur – Prilog poznavanju metalurških središta željeznodobnih naselja Srednje Bosne u svijetlu novih istraživanja – Zemaljski muzej Bosne i Hercegovine, Sarajevo, 2011.
- Mesihović, Salmedin (2011). "Ime ilirskog naroda Dezitijata" [The name of the Illyrian people Daesitiates]. Prilozi (in Bosnian). 40: 11–22.
- Wilkes, John (1992), The Illyrians, Wiley, ISBN 9780631146711
