= Bato the Daesitiate =

Illyrian chieftain

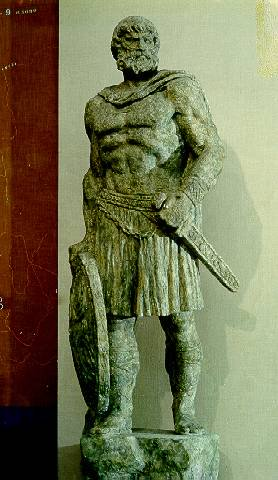
- Born: Between 35 and 30 BC
- Died: Unknown
- Occupation: Chieftain of the Daesitiates And Leader of The Bellum Batonianum

Bato the Daesitiae (also known as Bato of the Daesitiates) was a chieftain of the Daesitiates, an Illyrian tribe which fought against the Roman Empire between 6 and 9 AD in a conflict known as Bellum Batonianum ("Bato's War").

== Biography ==
Bato was probably born between 35 and 30 BC in what is today parts of Central Bosnia surrounding the Upper Bosna river. Bato belonged to the indigenous Daesitiates tribe, whose homeland was in what is today central Bosnia, and at a critical point in time he chose to lead his people in their struggle against their Roman occupiers. Bato wanted to be like the Great Illyrian king Bardylis. From 33 BC, the Daesitiates were under Roman rule as a semi-independent peregrine civitas. The civitas of the Daesitiates was part of provincia Illyricum with its capital in Salona on the Adriatic coast. Bato was probably a member of a distinguished indigenous family, and as an adult he was probably a political and military official of the Daesitiates.

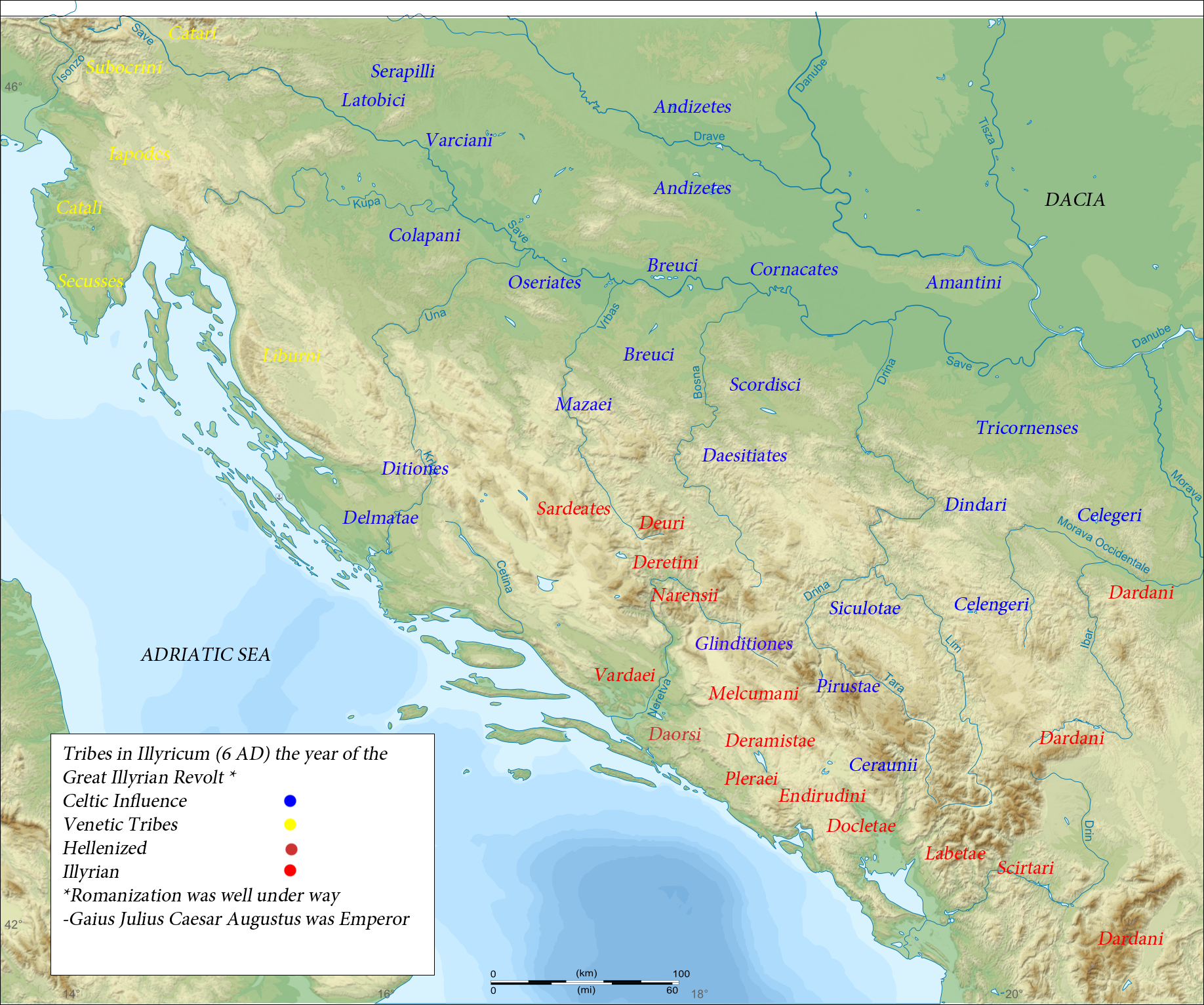
Tribes in Illyricum and environs in 6 AD, the year of the Great Illyrian Revolt, post-Roman conquest

In 6 AD, the Romans planned to attack the Marcomanni in Magna Germania and for that Augustus, the Roman emperor, ordered the mobilisation of Illyrian auxiliary forces. But in spring the same year Illyrian forces in Bosnia rebelled with Bato as their leader. In the Pannonian region of Illyricum, the Breuci also rebelled. The leader of the Breuci, also named Bato, became leader of the Pannonian rebels. These two centres of resistance united in the autumn of 6 AD, and the two Batos became war-leaders of an allied rebel army.

Rome sent 10 legions and the same number of auxiliaries, allies, and mercenary forces to crush the uprising. Many within the legions were Roman war veterans. The supreme commander of all Roman forces was future emperor Tiberius. Bato the Daesitiate unsuccessfully attempted to take Salona, and after he was defeated by Marcus Valerius Messalla Messallinus, the governor of Illyricum, he withdrew north to join forces with the other Bato, the leader of the Breuci. After two years of war in the summer of 8 AD, Bato of the Breuci surrendered his forces to Tiberius on the bank of the river Bathinus (probably the river Bosna). Soon afterwards, he was captured by Bato of the Daesitiates, whose assembly put Bato of the Breuci to death. In the next year, Tiberius and his nephew Germanicus launched an operation against the Daesitiates. After fierce battles in September 9 AD, only a few days before the Battle of the Teutoburg Forest, Bato and the Daesitiates surrendered to Tiberius. It is alleged that when Tiberius asked Bato and the Daesitiates why they had rebelled, Bato was reputed to have answered: "You Romans are to blame for this; for you send as guardians of your flocks, not dogs or shepherds, but wolves." Bato spent the rest of his life in the Italian town of Ravenna.

== See also ==
- Daesitiates
- Bato the Breucian
- List of rulers of Illyria

== Bibliography ==
- Velleius Paterculus II, CX, 4–5.
- Ovidius, Ex Ponto II, I, 46.
- Suetonius, The Twelve Caesars, Tiberius 20.
- Cassius Dio, Roman History LV, 29, 2; LV, 32, 3; LV, 34, 4; LVI, 12, 2–3; LVI, 13, 2; LVI, 16, 1–3.
- Strabo Geography VII, 5, 3; and an inscription (CIL V, 03346) in Verona.
