= Albania (placename) =

List of placenames for the word "Albania"

The toponym Albania may indicate several different geographical regions: A country in Southeast Europe; an ancient land in the Caucasus; as well as Scotland, Albania being a Latinization of a Gaelic name for Scotland, Alba; and a city in the U.S. state of New York.

== Albania (Southeast Europe) ==
Albania is the name of a country in Southeast Europe, attested in Medieval Latin. The name has derived from the Illyrian tribe of the Albanoi and their center Albanopolis, noted by the astronomer of Alexandria, Ptolemy, in the 2nd century AD. Linguists think that the element *alb- in the root word, is an Indo-European term for a type of mountainous topography, meaning "hill, mountain", also present in Alps. Through the root word alban and its rhotacized equivalents arban, albar, and arbar, the term appears as the ethnonym of Albanians in Medieval Greek documents as Albanoi and Arbanitai, and in Medieval Latin as Albanenses and Arbanenses, gradually entering in other European languages.

=== Arbon ===
The toponym Arbon (Greek: Ἄρβων or Ἀρβών) or Arbo (Greek: Άρβωνα) is mentioned by Polybius in the History of the World (2nd century BC). It was perhaps an island in Liburnia or another location within Illyria. Stephanus of Byzantium in the 6th century AD, in his important geographical dictionary entitled Ethnica (Εθνικά), cites Polybius, saying it was a city in Illyria and gives a topical name for its inhabitants, calling them Arbonios (Greek: Αρβώνιος) and Arbonites (Greek: Αρβωνίτης).

=== Albanopolis ===
Albanopolis was an ancient Illyrian city in the Roman province of Macedon, the center of the Illyrian tribe of Albani, noted by the astronomer of Alexandria, Ptolemy, during 150 AD in his famous work Geography. It was located in the Zgërdhesh hill-fort near Krujë, central Albania. The city may have a continuation with the name of the city of Albanon or Arbanon, mentioned during the Middle Ages.

Albanoi (Ἀλβανόί) reappeared in Byzantine documents in the 11th century, around 1043, as the exonym of the Albanians. During the late Byzantine period the names Albanoi, alongside Arbanitai, were used interchangeably, and gradually entered other European languages, in which similar derivative names emerged. The national ethnonym of the Albanians has derived from this Illyrian tribe.

=== Arbanon ===
Arbanon, or Albanon, originally, was a region in the mountainous area to the west of Lake Ohrid and the upper valley of the river Shkumbin, in the 11th century AD.

The Albanians are mentioned in Anna Comnena's account Alexiad, as Arbanites, because of their fights against the Normans in the region of Arbanon, during the reign of her father Alexios I Komnenos (1081–1118). Before that, in the book History written in 1079–1080, Byzantine historian Michael Attaliates was first to refer to the Albanoi as having taken part in a revolt against Constantinople in 1043 and to the Arbanitai as subjects of the duke of Dyrrachium. In later Byzantine usage, the terms Arbanitai and Albanoi, with a range of variants, were used interchangeably, while sometimes the same groups were also called by the classicising name Illyrians.

In the 12th to 13th centuries, Arbanon (Greek: Άρβανον) appears as a principality in Byzantine sources. In 1190 the Principality of Arbanon (Albanian: Principata e Arbërit) became the first Albanian state during the Middle Ages. Its capital was the city of Krujë, the region in which the town of Arbanon originally was located and from which the principality got its name. It seems that this toponym has survived continuously since antiquity in this area. This suggests that probably the toponym "Arbanon" has derived from the ancient city of Albanopolis.

In Latin documents the territory was known as Arbanum and later as Albaniae. It appears in Bulgarian chronicles as Arbanas. In medieval Serbian sources, the toponym of the country underwent linguistic metathesis and was rendered as Raban and Rabanski for the people. This is a typical metathesis in Slavic languages, for example the island of Arba in Croatia now is known as Rab. However, in later Serbian references the ethnonym for Albanians would appear as Arbanasi.

Meanwhile, the Albanians, during the Middle Ages, referred to their country as Arbëria (Gheg Albanian: Arbënia) and called themselves Arbëreshë (Gheg Albanian: Arbëneshë). In Southeast Europe, a similar term is still used today by the Aromanians, who call the Albanians in their language Arbineshi.

The medieval ethnonym Arbanitai and its corresponding modern ethnonym Arvanites have the same etymology as Albanians, being derived from the stem Alb- by way of a rhotacism, Alb- → Arb- (based on the root *alban- and its rhotacized variant *arban-). In fact, the term Arvanitis (Ἀρβανίτης) [singular form] was established in modern Greek language from the original name Alvanitis (Άλβανίτης), who in return derived from Alvanos (Ἀλβανος). Compare the rhotacism of alb- into arv- in the Neapolitan dialect of Italy.

== Albania (Caucasus) ==
Albania as the name of Caucasian Albania, a state and historical region of eastern Caucasus, that existed on the territory of present-day republic of Azerbaijan and partially southern Dagestan.

However, unlike the names of the other two European countries, this name was an exonym given to them by the Romans, as no one knew what the local inhabitants of the region of Caucasian Albania called themselves at the time. Compare also the land in Caucasus called Iberia, and the Iberian Peninsula in Europe.

The Udi people and their language, the Udi language, are descendants of the ancient people of Caucasian Albania.

== Alba (Scotland) ==
Alba, a Gaelic name for Scotland, may be related to the Greek name of Britain Albion, Latinized as Albania during the High Medieval period, and later passed into Middle English as Albany.

== Albion (Great Britain) ==
Albion (Ancient Greek: Ἀλβίων) is the oldest known name of the island of Great Britain. Today, it is still sometimes used poetically to refer to the island. The name for Scotland in the Celtic languages is related to Albion: Alba in Scottish Gaelic, Albain in Irish, Nalbin in Manx and Alban in Welsh, Cornish and Breton. These names were later Latinised as Albania and Anglicised as Albany, which were once alternative names for Scotland. New Albion and Albionoria ("Albion of the North") were briefly suggested as possible names of Canada during the period of the Canadian Confederation.

== Albany (New York) ==
Albany is the capital of the U.S. state of New York and the seat of Albany County. The name originates from the Scottish Duke of Albany, whose title comes from the Gaelic name for Scotland, Alba.

When New Netherland was captured by the English in 1664, they changed the name Beverwijck to Albany, in honor of the Duke of Albany. This was a Scottish title given since 1398, generally to the second son of the King of Scots. Albany is one of the oldest surviving European settlements from the original Thirteen Colonies and the longest continuously chartered city in the United States.

== See also ==
- Names of the Albanians and Albania
- Principality of Arbanon
- Albanoi
- Great Ireland
