= Abroi =

Sixth century BCE Illyrian tribe

The Abroi (Ancient Greek: Ἄβροι) were an Illyrian tribe. They may have been a constituent northern tribe of the larger group of the Taulantii, on the Adriatic coast of southern Illyria (present-day Albania).

== Name ==
The tribe is mentioned solely by Hecataeus of Miletus (6th century BCE), in fragment 69 of Periodos ges, cited by Stephanus of Byzantium (6th century CE). The name of the tribe is recorded in Ancient Greek as Ἄβροι Abroi.

Their name may have actually been Arboi as Abroi may have been produced via a metathesis, another linguistic process or a common misassociation by Hecataeus of their name with the ancient Greek term abros to better adapt it to Greek. The name Arboi would link them to the Illyrian Albanoi, who are attested in the same area in the 2nd century CE.

N. G. L. Hammond has pointed out that the name Abroi and Albanoi gave rise to the name Albania/Albanians, similar to the spread of the name Illyria/Illyrians from a small group of people on the Adriatic coast, the Illyrioi. This process can also be seen in the case of Graeci and Hellenes.

== Geography ==
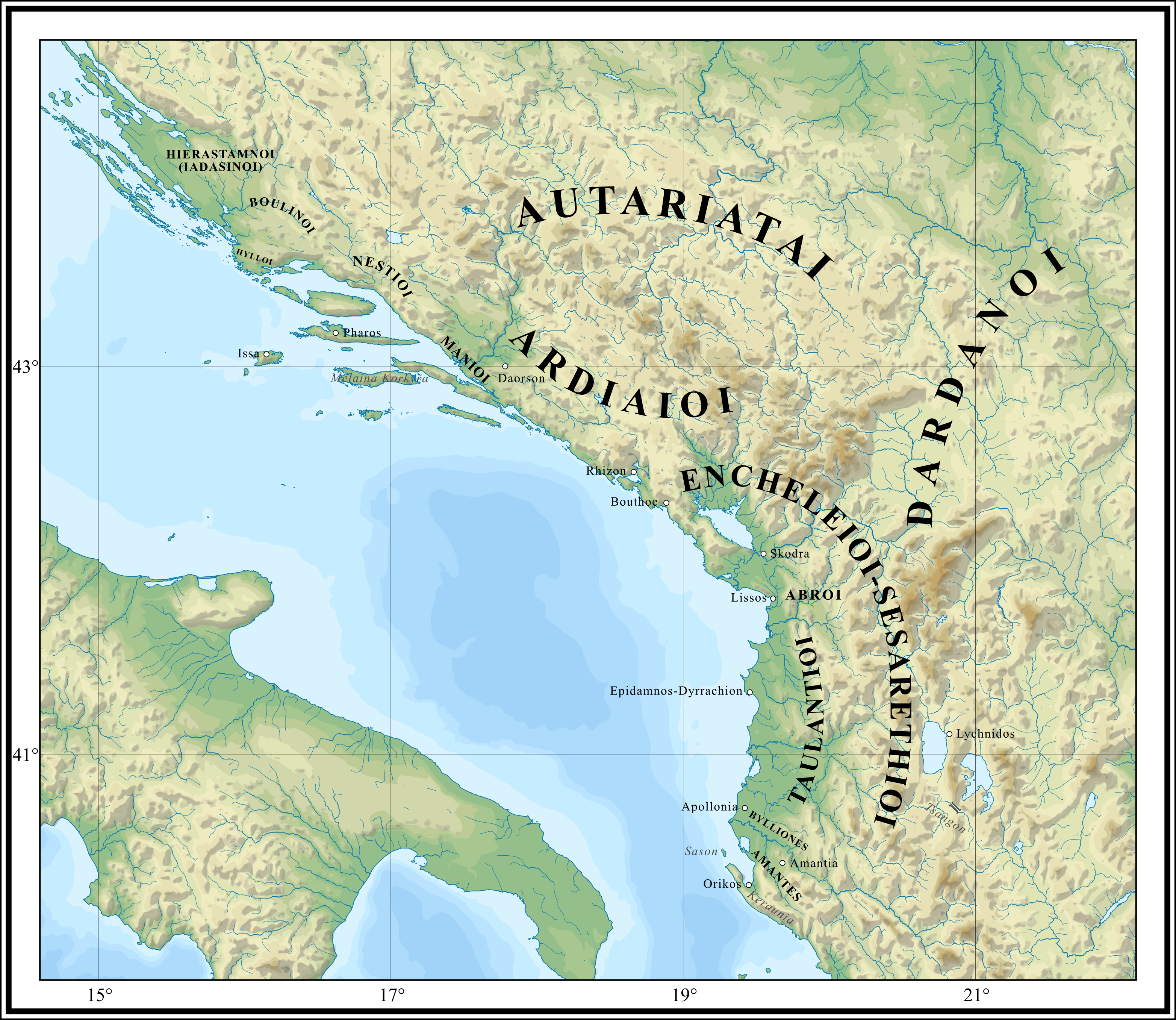
Illyrian tribes in the 7th–4th centuries BCE.

Hecataeus places them near the Taulantii who lived along the Adriatic and the Enchelei. In modern scholarship the Abroi are generally placed near the Mat and Drin valleys. The Abroi may have been a constituent northern tribe of the larger group of the Taulantii.

== Cuisine ==
They could prepare mead, a wine from honey, and were known to the Ancient Greek writers for that method.

== See also ==
- List of ancient tribes in Illyria

== Bibliography ==
- Campbell, Duncan R. J. (2009). The so-called Galatae, Celts, and Gauls in the Early Hellenistic Balkans and the Attack on Delphi in 280–279 BC (Thesis). University of Leicester.
- Hammond, Nicholas Geoffrey Lemprière (1994). "Illyrians and North-west Greeks". In Lewis, David Malcolm; Boardman, John; Hornblower, Simon; Ostwald, M. (eds.). The Cambridge Ancient History: The Fourth Century B.C. Vol. VI (2nd ed.). Cambridge: Cambridge University Press. pp. 422–443. ISBN 0-521-23348-8.
- Plasari, Aurel (2020). "The Albanians in attestations from late antiquity until the early Middle Ages". Albanian Studies. 2. Academy of Sciences of Albania.
- Wilkes, John J. (1992). The Illyrians. Oxford, United Kingdom: Blackwell Publishing. ISBN 0-631-19807-5.
