= Albanoi =

Illyrian tribe

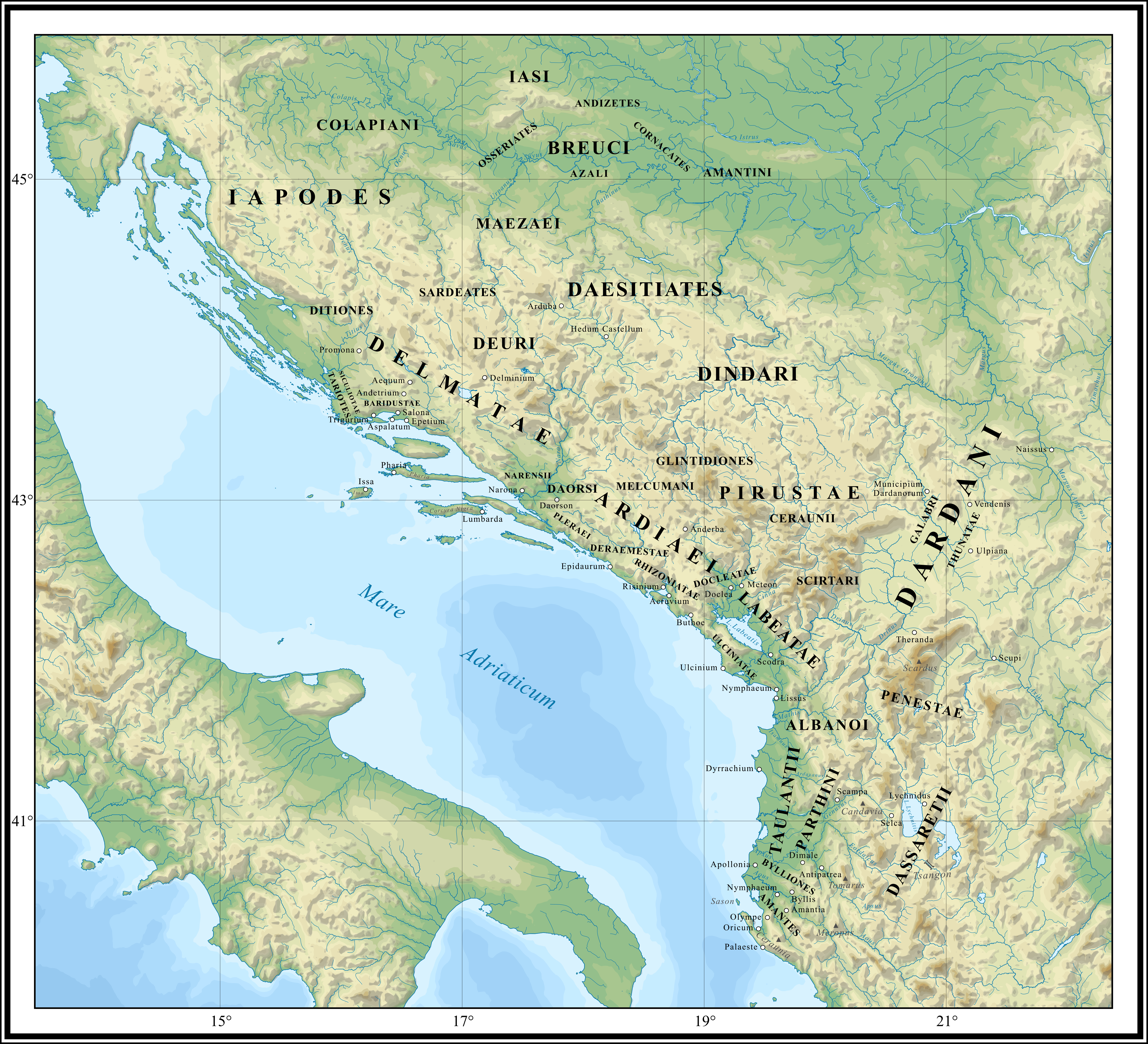
Illyrian tribes in the 1st–2nd centuries CE

The Albanoi (also Albani; Ancient Greek: Ἀλβανοί, romanized: Albanoi; Latin: Albani) were an ancient Illyrian tribe whose central settlement Albanopolis (Ἀλβανόπολις) was located roughly between the Mat and Shkumbin rivers, in what is today central Albania. The archaeological site of Zgërdhesh has been identified as its likely location. They were possibly first mentioned by Hecataeus of Miletus (550–476 BCE) under the name Abroi. Ptolemy (100–170 CE) is the first author to mention them under the name Albanoi. Stephanus of Byzantium who reproduced Hecataeus, added an entry for another settlement named Arbon in Illyria whose inhabitants were called Arbonioi or Arbonites. Another Arbon was recorded by Polybius. John of Nikiû wrote in the 7th century CE about a people known as Arbanitai in the Greek translation of the manuscript.

In the Middle Ages, the names Albanoi and Arbanitai/Albanitai referred to medieval Albanians as an ethnic group. The equivalent terms in Latin are Albanenses/Arbanenses, in Slavic Arbanasi and later in Turkish Arnaut. These names reflect the Albanian ethnic endonym Arbëreshë/Arbëneshë, which itself derives from Albanoi. In the archaeological record, the Albanoi are mentioned on a funeral inscription in Stobi and Albanopolis is mentioned on another funeral inscription near Scupi. Another ethnonym, Arbaios found in Phoenice is likely linked to them.

== Name ==
The Albanoi were possibly first mentioned by Hecataeus of Miletus (550–476 BCE) under the name Abroi; they lived around the same area. Abroi may have been produced via a metathesis of Arboi, another linguistic process or a common misassociation by Hecataeus of the indigenous name with the ancient Greek term abros to better adapt it to Greek. Ptolemy (100–170 CE) is the first author who mentions them under the name Albanoi.

The name of the Illyrian tribe – Abroi or Arboi and Albanoi – which gave rise to the ethnonyms Аrbёn, Arbёr, and Albanians, which were later generalized to all the Illyrian tribes speaking the same language. The process was similar to the spread of the name Illyrians from a small group of people on the Adriatic coast, the Illyrioi. It occurred also in the spread of the ethnonyms Greeks and Hellenes from Graeci and Hellenes, respectively.

== Ancient and medieval literature ==
The Albanoi may have first appeared under the name Abroi in ancient literature. The Abroi may have been a constituent tribe of the larger group of the Taulantii. Hecataeus first mentions them in fragment 69 of Periodos ges. He places them near the Taulanti who lived along the Adriatic and the Enchelei. In 19th century and 20th century cartographies, they are variously placed in the upper Devoll or the coastal area between the Mat and Shkumbin rivers. The name Arboi directly connects them to the later Albanoi who lived in the same region. Stephanus of Byzantium who copied much of the work of Hecataeus in the 6th century CE added another entry about a city named Arbon in Illyria per Polybius and identified its demonyms as Arbonios and Arbonitis.

Polybius (200–118 BCE) mentions a location named Arbon in his description of the Illyrian Wars. Arbon, in a series of mistranslations, has been called an island or a city, even though Polybius never mentions it as such. The place has not been identified, and it is unlikely that it refers to the northern Adriatic island of Rab (attested for the first time as Arba by Pliny). An interdisciplinary reading of the passage indicates that Arbon may have been in central Albania, roughly in the same location as the later Albanopolis (Ptolemy) and Arbanon (Anna Komnene). Wilhelm Tomaschek (1841–1901) considered Arbon to be the "first attestation of the modern name of Albania".

Ptolemy mentions the Albanoi in the third book of Geographia. They were a people who lived in the region between the Mat and Shkumbin and held the settlement Albanopolis. Johann Georg von Hahn first noted that the suffix -polis ('city') was probably added at a later date by other authors, as in other editions it is mentioned as "Albanos polis" or "Albanos". Zgërdhesh has been identified as the likely location of Albanopolis. It is not certain if its location corresponds to the region mentioned as Arbanon mentioned by Anna Komnene in the Alexiad about events related to the First Norman invasion of the Balkans (1081). An indication of movement from higher altitudes in a much earlier period has been detected in the distribution of Albanian place names ending in -esh, derives from the Latin -ensis (Vulgar Latin -ēsis), between the Shkumbin and Mat rivers, with a concentration between Elbasan and Krujë.

John of Nikiû (7th century), a Coptic bishop mentions in the French translation of a manuscript titled Chronicle that "barbarians, foreign peoples and Illyrians, ravaged the cities of the Christians and took the inhabitants alive" in the Byzantine Empire. Hermann Zotenberg who translated the chronicle from Geʽez to French rendered with the term Illyrians, a term which in the original manuscript corresponded to Alwerikon. Alwerikon in the Byzantine Greek translation of the chronicle corresponded to the term Albani(k/t)on (genitive of Albanitai). Constantine Sathas (1842–1912) who first recorded the discrepancy between different translations considered the mention of Alwerikon an attestation of the same population as the Illyrian Albanoi.

Michael Attaleiates (1022–1080) mentions the term Albanoi twice and the term Arbanitai once. The term Albanoi is used first to describe the groups which rebelled in southern Italy and Sicily against the Byzantines in 1038–1040. The second use of the term Albanoi is related to groups which supported the revolt of George Maniakes in 1042 and marched with him throughout the Balkans against the Byzantine capital, Constantinople. The term Arvanitai is used to describe a revolt of Bulgarians (Boulgaroi) and Arbanitai in the theme of Dyrrhachium in 1078–79. It is generally accepted that Arbanitai refers to the ethnonym of medieval Albanians. As such, it is considered to be the first attestation of Albanians as an ethnic group in Byzantine historiography. What is possibly the earliest written reference to the Albanians is that to be found in an old Bulgarian text compiled around the beginning of the eleventh century (1000 - 1018 AD according to Radoslav Grujic) where Arbanasi and their language are mentioned as half-believers, the text was translated by Robert Elsie from Old Church Slavonic. The use of the term Albanoi in 1038–1049 and 1042 as an ethnonym related to Albanians have been a subject of debate. In what has been termed the Vranoussi–Ducellier debate, Alain Ducellier proposed that both uses of the term referred to medieval Albanians. Era Vranoussi counter-suggested that the first use referred to Normans, while the second did not necessarily have an ethnic connotation, and could be a reference to the Normans as foreigners (aubain) in Epirus, which Maniakes and his army traversed. This debate has never been resolved. A newer synthesis about the second use of the term Albanoi by Pëllumb Xhufi suggests that the term Albanoi may have referred to Albanians of the specific district of Arbanon, while Arbanitai to Albanians in general regardless of the specific region they inhabited. From thereon, in the next centuries, the term Albanoi is used extensively as the ethnonym for medieval Albanians in Byzantine literature. Albanoi is the formal term for Albanians in modern Greek and until the 20th century it was used interchangeably with the term Arbanitai, which now in Greek refers exclusively to Arvanites. These names reflect the Albanian endonym Arbëresh which itself derives from the same root as the name of the Albanoi.

Albanopolis is possibly mentioned in 1332 as Albanensis and as a town inhabited by Albanians.

== Archaeology ==
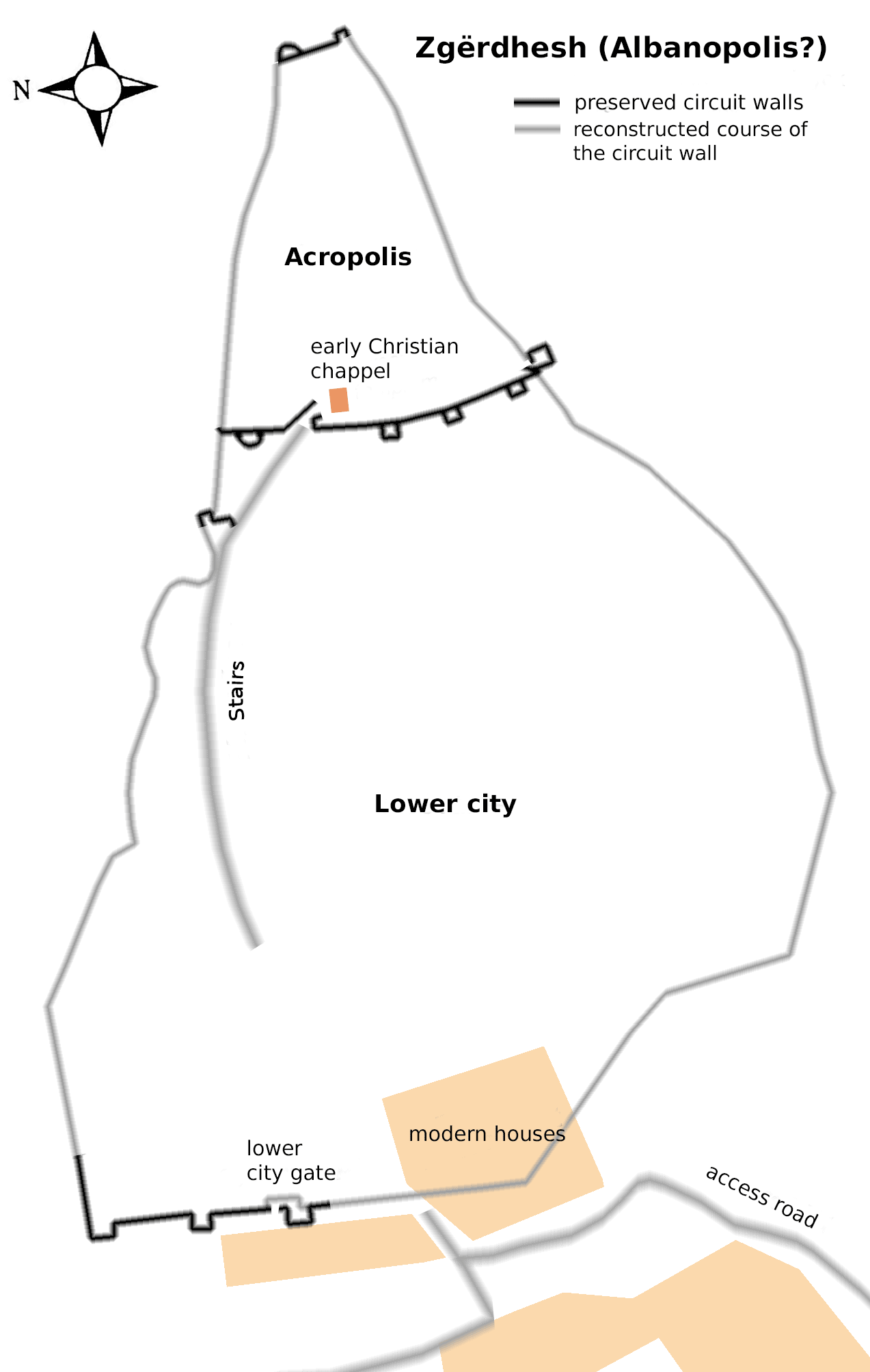
Plan of Zgërdhesh

In the archaeological record, the Albanoi and Albanopolis have been directly attested on two funeral inscriptions. The toponym Albanopolis has been found on a funeral inscription in Gorno Sonje, near the city of Skopje (ancient Scupi), present-day North Macedonia. It was excavated in 1931 by Nikola Vulić and its text was curated and published in 1982 by Borka Dragojević-Josifovska. The inscription in Latin reads:

POSIS MESTYLU F[ILIUS] FL[AVIA] DELVS MVCATI F[ILIA] DOM[O] ALBANOP[OLI] IPSA DELVS

Translation:

Posis Mestylu, son of Flavia Delus, daughter of Mucatus, who comes from Albanopolis

It dates to the end of the 1st century CE and the beginning of the 2nd century CE. Dragojević-Josifovska added two lines to the existing reading: VIVA P(OSUIT) SIBI/ ET VIRO SUO. Like others, he presumably had settled in Scupi from Albanopolis. The name of the mentioned peoples' progenitor – Mucatus – bears the Palaeo-Balkan root Muk- (Μουκ-), which is spread throughout the central Balkans featuring different suffixes depending on the language that used it. In particular the form Mucatus is characteristic of the Dardani (a similar form is also attested among the Pirustae in Dardania).

The site of Zgërdhesh, southwest of Krujë in central Albania, has been identified as the likely location of Albanopolis. The settlement covered 10 ha at a hill-fort location. Excavations show that the site was abandoned shortly after the Roman conquest of southern Illyria (Third Illyrian War). As an Albanopolis did exist long after, as the Scupi inscription highlights, it is possible that the inhabitants had relocated their settlement.

The ethnonym Albanos was found on a funeral inscription of the 2nd/3rd century CE from ancient Stobi, near Gradsko about 90 km to the southeast of Gorno Sonje. The inscription in ancient Greek reads:

ΦΛ(ΑΒΙΩ) ΑΛΒΑΝΩ ΤΩ ΤΕΚΝΩ ΑΙΜΙΛΙΑΝΟΣ ΑΛΒΑΝΟ(Σ) ΜΝΗΜ(Η)Σ ΧΑΡIΝ

Translation:

To the child Flavios Albanos; Aemilianos Albanos (erected this) in memory thereof

An inscription in ancient Greek in Phoenice, southern Albania, related to the liberation act of the slave Nikarchos Nikomachou Arbaios is linked to the Albanoi as Arbaios is an ethnonym which has the same root as that of the Albanoi and has not been attested anywhere else. Arbaios is considered to not have been a local of the city of Phoenice, but someone who had been moved there from more northern areas in central Albania. The inscription was excavated in the 1920s by Luigi Ugolini. It dates to the 3rd/2nd century BCE.

== See also ==
- List of Illyrian peoples and tribes
- Origin of Albanians
- Names of the Albanians and Albania

== Sources ==
- Babamova, Slavica (2008). "Personal names on the territory of Paeonia in the Roman period". Živa Antika / Antiquité Vivante. 58 (1–2): 87–96. eISSN 2671-3985. ISSN 0514-7727.
- Baltsiotis, Lambros (2018). "Greeks and Albanians in the 19th and 20th centuries: Consecutive and reversed perceptions". Synchrona Themata (in Greek). 2018/2019 (143–144).
- Biçoku, Kasëm (1992). "Les regions ethniques Albanaises au Moyen Age et la propagation du nom national "Arber"". Studia Albanica. XXIX: 01/02.
- Cabanes, Pierre (1974). L'Epire: de la mort de Pyrrhos à la conquête romaine (272-167) (in French). Paris: Annales Littéraires de l'Université de Besancon.
- Campbell, Duncan R. J. (2009). The so-called Galatae, Celts, and Gauls in the Early Hellenistic Balkans and the Attack on Delphi in 280–279 BC (Thesis). University of Leicester.
- Demiraj, Shaban (2015). "Albanian". In Giacalone Ramat, Anna (ed.). The Indo-European Languages. Routledge. ISBN 978-1134921874.
- Demiraj, Bardhyl (2020). "The Evolution of Albanian". Studia Albanica (2). Academy of Sciences of Albania: 33–40. ISSN 0585-5047.
- Donev, Damjan (2018). "Aspects of Roman Urbanization in the Hellenistic Balkans". In Willet, Rinse (ed.). The Economics of Urbanism in the Roman East (PDF). Propylaeum. ISBN 978-3-947450-96-1.
- Dragojević-Josifovska, Borka (1982). Inscriptions de la Mésie supérieure, Scupi et la région de Kumanovo. Centre d'études épigraphiques et numismatiques de la Faculté de philosophie de l'Université de Beograd. ISBN 8680269166.
- Plasari, Aurel (2020). "The Albanians in attestations from late antiquity until the early Middle Ages". Albanian Studies. 2. Academy of Sciences of Albania.
- Quanrud, John (2021). "The Albanoi in Michael Attaleiates' History: revisiting the Vranoussi-Ducellier debate". Byzantine and Modern Greek Studies. 45 (2): 149–165. doi:10.1017/byz.2021.11. S2CID 237424879.
- Spasovska-Dimitrioska, Gordana (2000). Chaniotis, Angelos (ed.). Supplementum epigraphicum graecum. J.C. Gieben. ISBN 9789050632287.
- Wilkes, John (1996) [1992]. The Illyrians. Wiley. ISBN 978-0-631-19807-9.
- Winnifrith, Tom (2021). Nobody's Kingdom: A History of Northern Albania. Signal Books. ISBN 9781909930957.
