= Albanopolis =

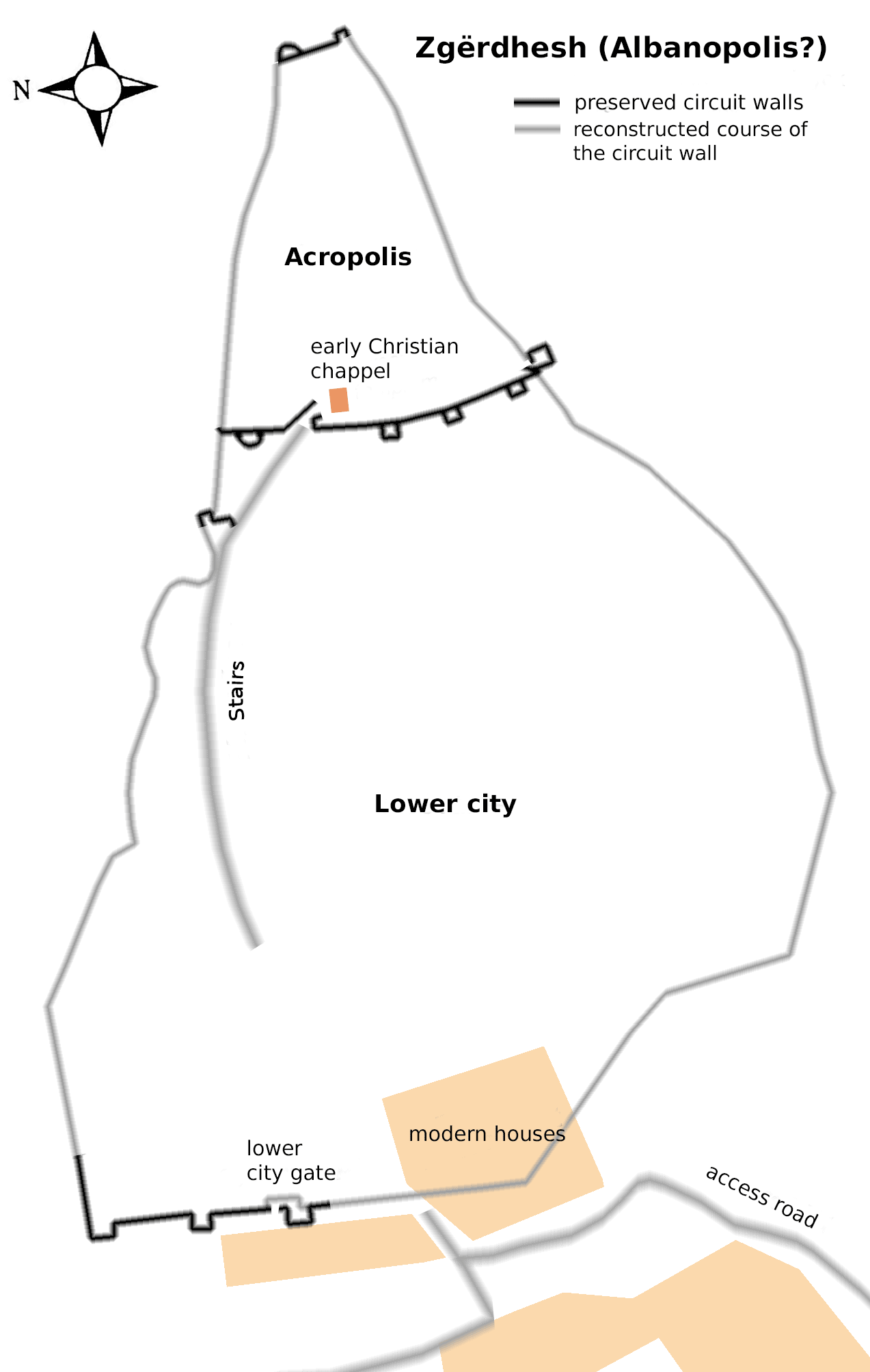
Plan of the Zgërdhesh site

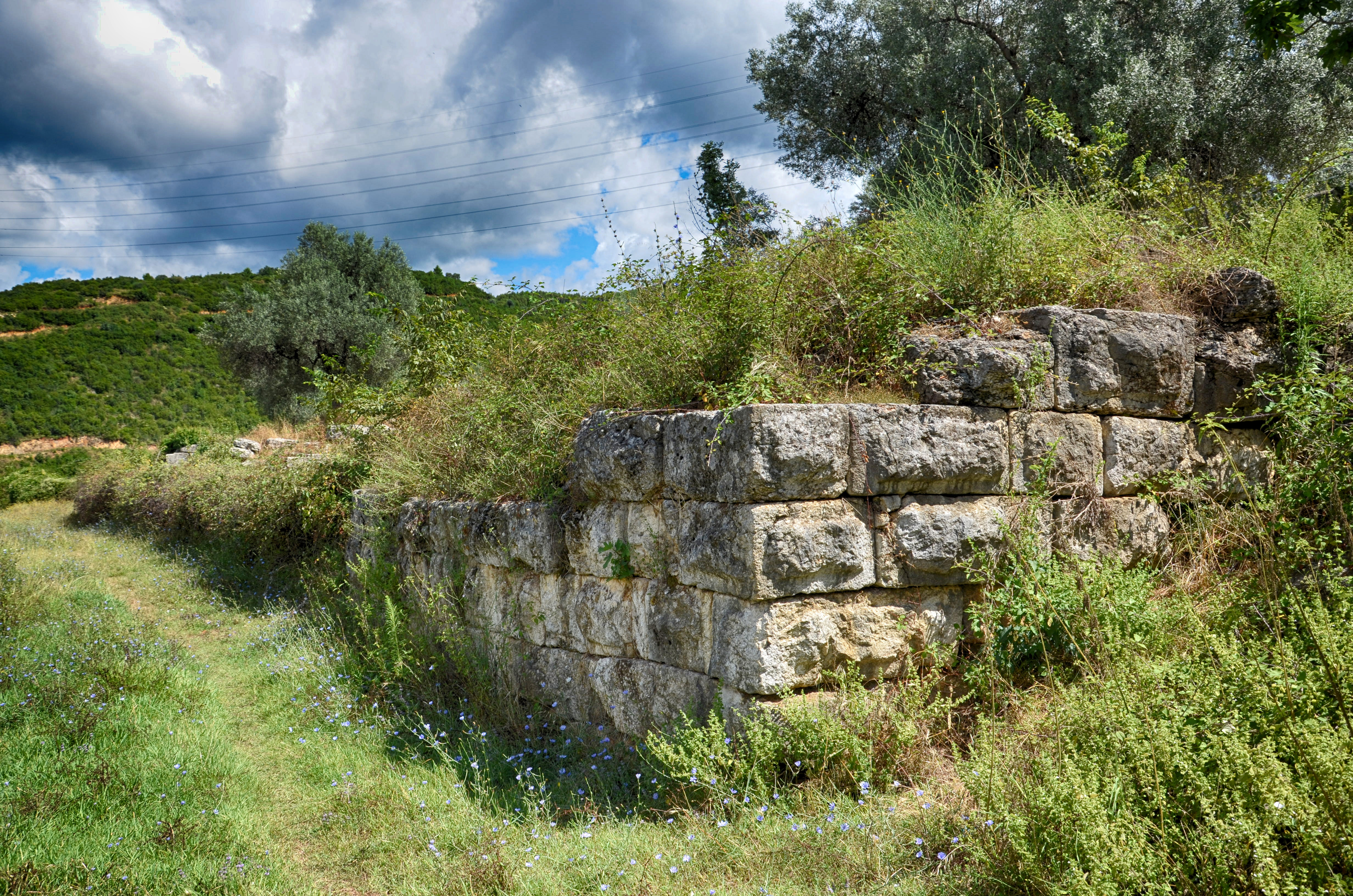
City walls in Zgërdhesh

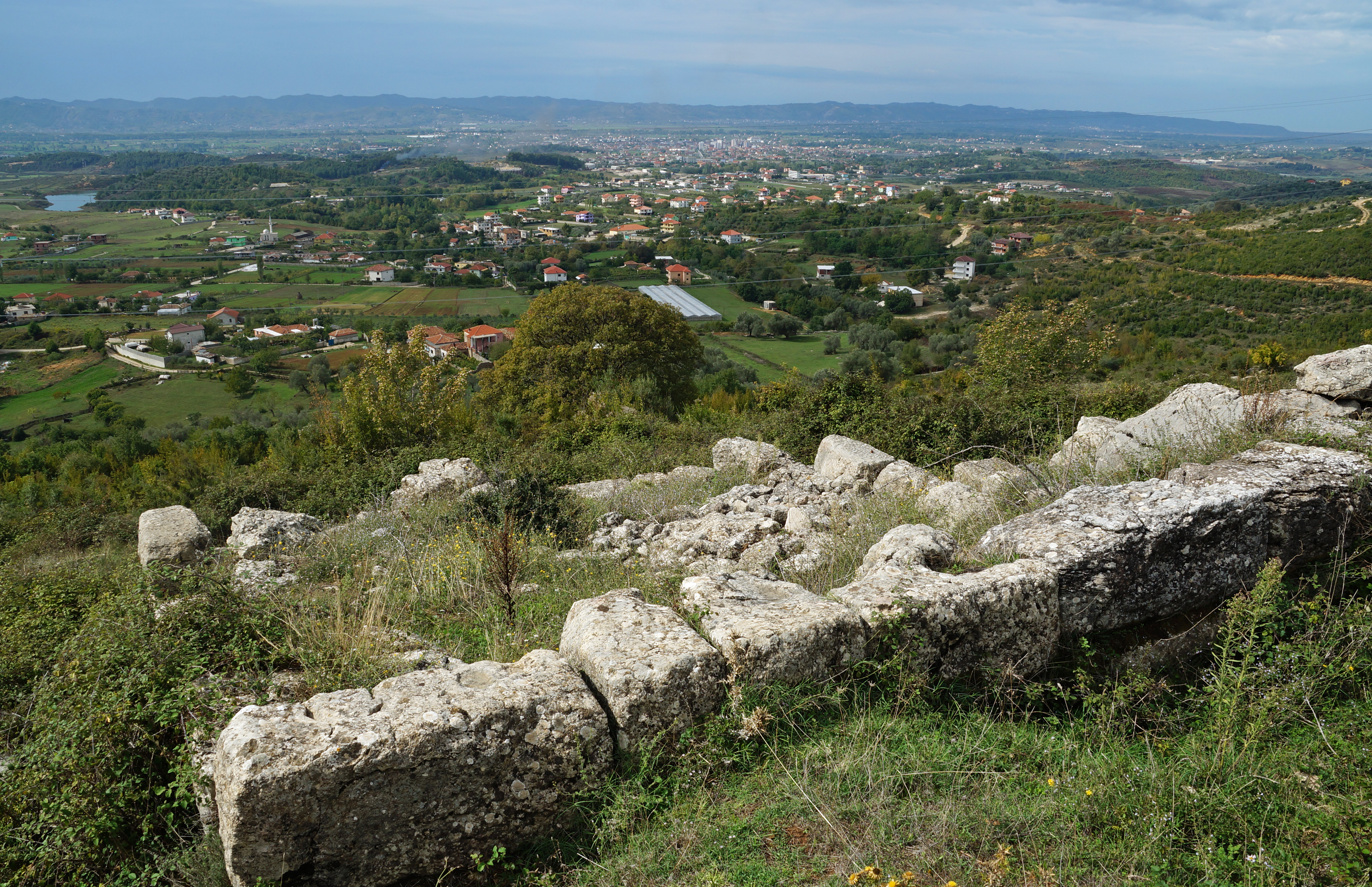
Acropolis walls in Zgërdhesh

Albanopolis (Albanian: Albanopolis; Ancient Greek: Ἀλβανόπολις, romanized: Albanópolis) was a city of the Albanoi, an Illyrian tribe. Albanopolis has been located by various scholars at the modern-day village of Zgërdhesh or at Krujë. The ancient city may correspond with later mentions of the settlement called Arbanon and Albanon during the Middle Ages, although it is not certain this was the same place. The city appears in the literature in 150 AD, almost 300 years after Roman conquest of the region.

The city and its tribe gave their name to modern Albania.

== Attestation ==
The toponym Albanopolis has been found on a funeral inscription in Gorno Sonje, near the city of Skopje (ancient Scupi), present-day North Macedonia. It was discovered in 1931 by Nikola Vulić and its text was analyzed and published in 1982 by Borka Dragojević-Josifovska. The inscription in Latin reads "POSIS MESTYLU F[ILIUS] FL[AVIA] DELVS MVCATI F[ILIA] DOM[O] ALBANOP[OLI] IPSA DELVS". It is translated as "Posis Mestylu, son of Flavia, daughter of Delus Mucati, who comes from Albanopolis". It dates to the end of the 1st century or beginning of the 2nd century AD.

Ptolemy (100-170 AD) is the only author who mentions Albanopolis. He mentions it in the third book of Geographia as a city of a tribe he refers to as the Albanoi. He locates the settlement on the coordinates 46° (longitude east of the Canary Islands) and 41°05′ (latitude), in the hinterland of Durrës in the northwestern part of the province of Macedonia.

== Name ==
The toponym Albanopolis is composed of "Albanoi", a tribe name, and "polis", a Greek word meaning "city, castle, fortification". Hasan Ceka argued that the suffix "polis" was added at a later date by copyists of Ptolemy's work. Johann Georg von Hahn noted that in some manuscripts the city is mentioned as "Albanos polis" or "Albanos". Ancient ethnic names are very rarely found in combination with "polis". As such, Etleva Metalla and Thomas Maurer argue that the name Albanopolis, instead of being a traditional city name, was of a city that was newly founded or at least renamed. They date the naming at some point between 167 BC and the early Roman Imperial period.

The ethnonym Albanoi assumed a particular importance in the ethnogensis of the Albanians, as it became their endonym, under circumstances that are no longer recognizable.

== Location ==
The Albanoi mentioned by Ptolemy have traditionally been associated with the Arbanioi/Albanoi recorded in Byzantine sources from the 11th century onwards, whose territory lay in the hinterland of Dyrrachium. However, there is a gap of approximately 900 years between Ptolemy's mention and the first recorded appearance of the medieval Albanians.

Early cartographic representations of Albanopolis were based primarily on the geographical coordinates provided by Ptolemy. An example is the 1770 map Mappa Geographica Graeciae Septentrionalis hodiernae, sive provinciarum Macedoniae, Thessaliae et Albania [...], published in Nuremberg by Homann's Heirs, which depicts Albanopolis in two separate locations: first, near the confluence of the White and Black Drin rivers, in the vicinity of present-day Kukës, and secondly, farther south along the middle course of the Black Drin. Pouqueville was the first to make an attempt at identification with a specific site; based on an alleged similarity in sound, he identified Albanopolis with Elbasan, a place-name variant of which is Albasan. Desdevies made the identification with Krujë, largely based on its medieval importance, in particular its status as the de facto capital of Albania during the time of Skanderbeg. Other, later, identifications have been made, including Përseq/Mali i Vilës, an insufficiently investigated ancient mountain fortification located south of Tirana, and Polis, east of Elbasan, which was proposed by Dhimitër Shuteriqi on onomastic grounds. The Austrian diplomat Johann Georg von Hahn was the first to identify Albanopolis with Zgërdhesh, an archaeological site in the western foothills of Mount Krujë. During his research in the area, he did not find other ruins which could be linked with the ancient city. Aurel Plasari finds Zgërdhesh as the most convincing location, and argues that the Albanoi were a people who lived in the region between Mat and Shkumbin. Plasari argues that some statements made in Geographia did not necessarily describe the contemporary world of Ptolemy, because he relied on the much older writings of Ionic and Hellenic geographers. As such, the Albanoi could be a reflection of older accounts rather than a reality of the 2nd century AD. Saimir Shpuza identifies Albanopolis with Zgërdhesh and notes that it seems to be the only important settlement in the hinterland of Durrës. Zgërdhesh has increasingly been promoted by local authorities as ancient Albanopolis through municipal initiatives, tourist signage and improved infrastructure. However, despite these efforts to establish its historical identity and attract visitors, the site continues to receive relatively few tourists.

However, archaeologists Thomas Maurer and Elvana Metalla have proposed that Zgërdhesh cannot be identified with Albanopolis. According to their findings, Zgërdhesh flourished during the Hellenistic period and was largely abandoned during the Roman imperial period. Albanopolis, on the other hand, was important enough in the 1st and 2nd centuries AD to be mentioned by Ptolemy as a settlement of the Albanoi. Instead, based on the longitude coordinates provided by Ptolemy, Maurer and Metalla propose that Albanopolis was located to the east, somewhere in the river valleys of the Black Drin or the Upper Vardar in the Šar Mountains area.

== See also ==
- Illyria
- Albania (placename)
- List of ancient cities in Illyria
