= Republic of Central Albania =

1913–1914 unrecognised state in Southeast Europe

Republic of Central Albania Republika e Shqipërisë së Mesme (Albanian)
- 1913–1914
- Flag (Note: Personal flag of Essad Toptani)

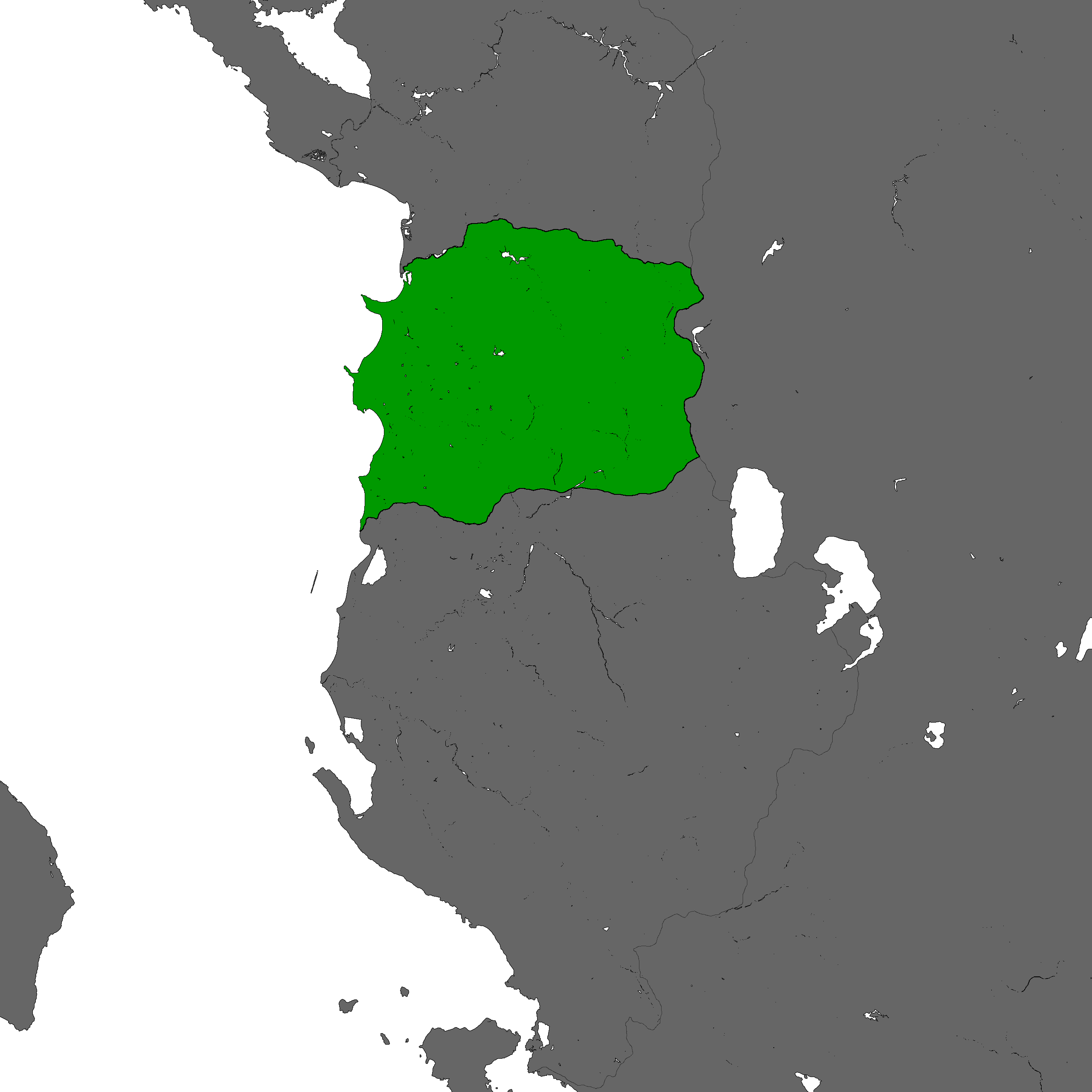
- Status: Former unrecognized country
- Capital: Durrës
- Common languages: Albanian
- Government: Republic
- President
  - 1913–1914: Essad Pasha Toptani
- Historical era: Between the Balkan Wars and the establishment of the Principality of Albania
  - Established: 16 October 1913
  - Wilhelm, Prince of Albania takes control of the Principality of Albania after his arrival at port Durrës: 7 March 1914
Preceded by	Succeeded by
Ottoman Empire	Principality of Albania

The Republic of Central Albania (Albanian: Republika e Shqipërisë së Mesme) was a short-lived unrecognised state established on 16 October 1913, with its administrative centre in Durrës, today in Albania.

== History ==
The government of the Republic of Central Albania was established in Durrës on 16 October 1913 by Essad Pasha Toptani and ended when William of Wied, prince of Principality of Albania, took control over the country upon his arrival in Albania on 7 March 1914. There are sources that connect the end of the Republic of Central Albania with the date of 1 February 1914, when an Albanian delegation led by Essad Pasha Toptani offered the Albanian throne to William of Wied. The flag of the Republic of Central Albania was red with white star in the lower right part.

The Republic of Central Albania issued its own post stamps. Faik Konitza initially gave his support to the government of Essad Pasha.

=== Essad Pasha Toptani ===
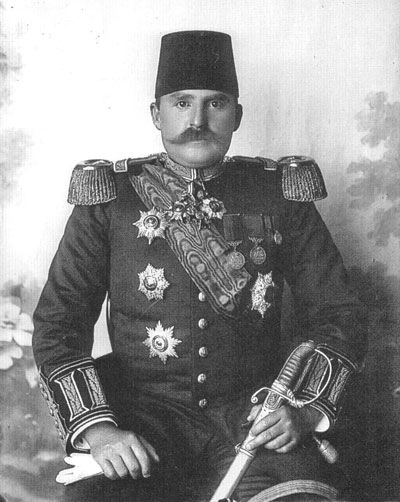
Essad Pasha Toptani

Essad Pasha Toptani played a key role in establishing the Republic of Central Albania . During the First Balkan War, he became famous for his resistance during the Siege of Scutari. He was a member of the Toptani family, one of many families that were rich feudal Muslim landowners with privileged status during Ottoman rule. These Muslim landowners, together with Muslim priests, were afraid of losing their privileged status after the signing of the London Peace Treaty and the decision of the Great Powers about the future status of the territory which today belongs to Albania.

=== Support from the Kingdom of Serbia ===
The Kingdom of Serbia agreed to support Essad Pasha's government financially, and even with military force if needed. In exchange, Essad Pasha agreed to neutralize a large group of about 20,000 kachaks from Kosovo and Macedonia. They were led by Isa Boletini and supported by Ismail Qemali and his Provisional Government of Albania. Essad Pasha agreed to help the Kingdom of Serbia acquire part of the coastal areas north of Black Drin.

=== Relations with the Ottoman Empire ===
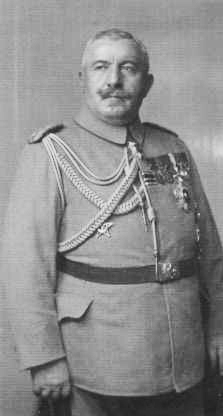
Ahmed İzzet Pasha

Pro-Ottoman Muslim landowners and priests supported Essad Pasha Toptani, who remained loyal to the Ottoman Empire during the First World War and maintained close contacts with the government in Istanbul. Young Turks from Istanbul were still hoping to restore Ottoman suzerainty over Albania and sent agents to Albania. A plot by the Young Turk government and led by Bekir Fikri to restore Ottoman control over Albania through the instalment of an Ottoman-Albanian officer Ahmed Izzet Pasha as monarch was uncovered by the Serbs and reported to the ICC. Ismail Qemali supported the plot for military assistance against Serbia and Greece. The International Control Commission (ICC), an organisation temporarily administering Albania on behalf of the Great Powers allowed their Dutch officers serving as the Albanian Gendarmerie to declare a state of emergency and stop the plot. They raided Vlorë on 7–8 January 1914, discovering more than 200 Ottoman troops and arresting Fikri. During Fikri's trial the plot emerged and an ICC military court under Colonel Willem de Veer condemned him to death (later commuted to life imprisonment) while Qemali and his cabinet resigned. Turmoil ensued throughout Albania after Qemali left the country.

=== Rivalry with Qemali's Provisional government of Albania ===
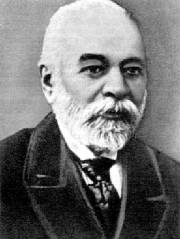
Ismail Qemali

While Essad Pasha Toptani established the Republic of Central Albania, there was another rival government in Vlore — the Provisional Government of Albania — led by Ismail Qemali that wished to control the territory of the Republic of Central Albania. This government was established by a group of Albanians gathered from four Ottoman vilayets. During the negotiations between Albanian rebels and negotiators from the Ottoman Empire in 1912, the parties had agreed to merge the four vilayets of Kosovo, Scutari, Monastir and Janina into one Albanian vilayet. Since the First Balkan War started before this agreement was confirmed in the assembly of the Ottoman Empire, this united Albanian vilayet remained officially unrecognised. Its independence was declared on 28 November 1912, by a group of Albanians that Qemali had gathered from all four Ottoman vilayets together with four men, Albanians of Romania. Austria and Italy supported the intentions of Qemali and his government to create a state whose territory would span all areas populated by Albanians, including Kosovo, parts of Montenegro, Macedonia and Greece.

In his work, Memorandum on Albania, Essad Pasha Toptani denied that Qemali's government was legitimate, writing that it was "the personal creation of a number of men."

== Aftermath ==
By establishing the Republic of Central Albania, Essad Pasha Toptani isolated supporters of Ismail Qemali and his Provisional Government of Albania from the northern part of Albania mainly populated with Catholics. These Catholics were reluctant to submit to any of the two national governments, just as they were reluctant to surrender to the Porte. Thus, after the Balkan Wars and before prince Wilhelm of Wied took control of the newly established Principality of Albania on 7 March 1914, Albania was divided into three parts. One part north of the Mat river was under the control of Catholics, the central part was territory held by the Republic of Central Albania and under control of government led by Essad Pasha Toptani, while the third part, south of the Shkumbin river, was under the control of the Provisional Government of Albania led by Ismail Qemali who declared independence of Albanian vilayet.
