= Krujë =

City in Albania

- Municipality
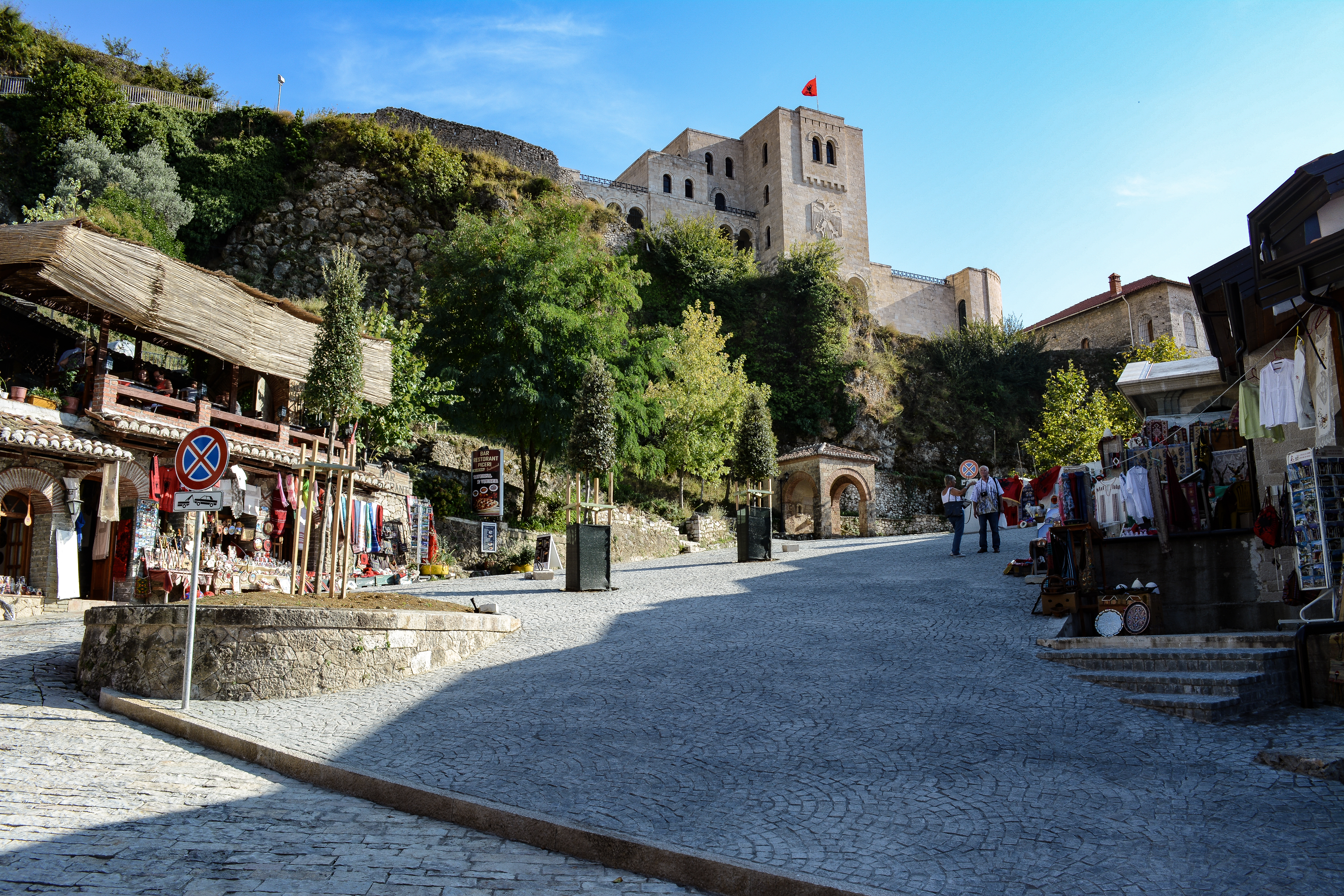
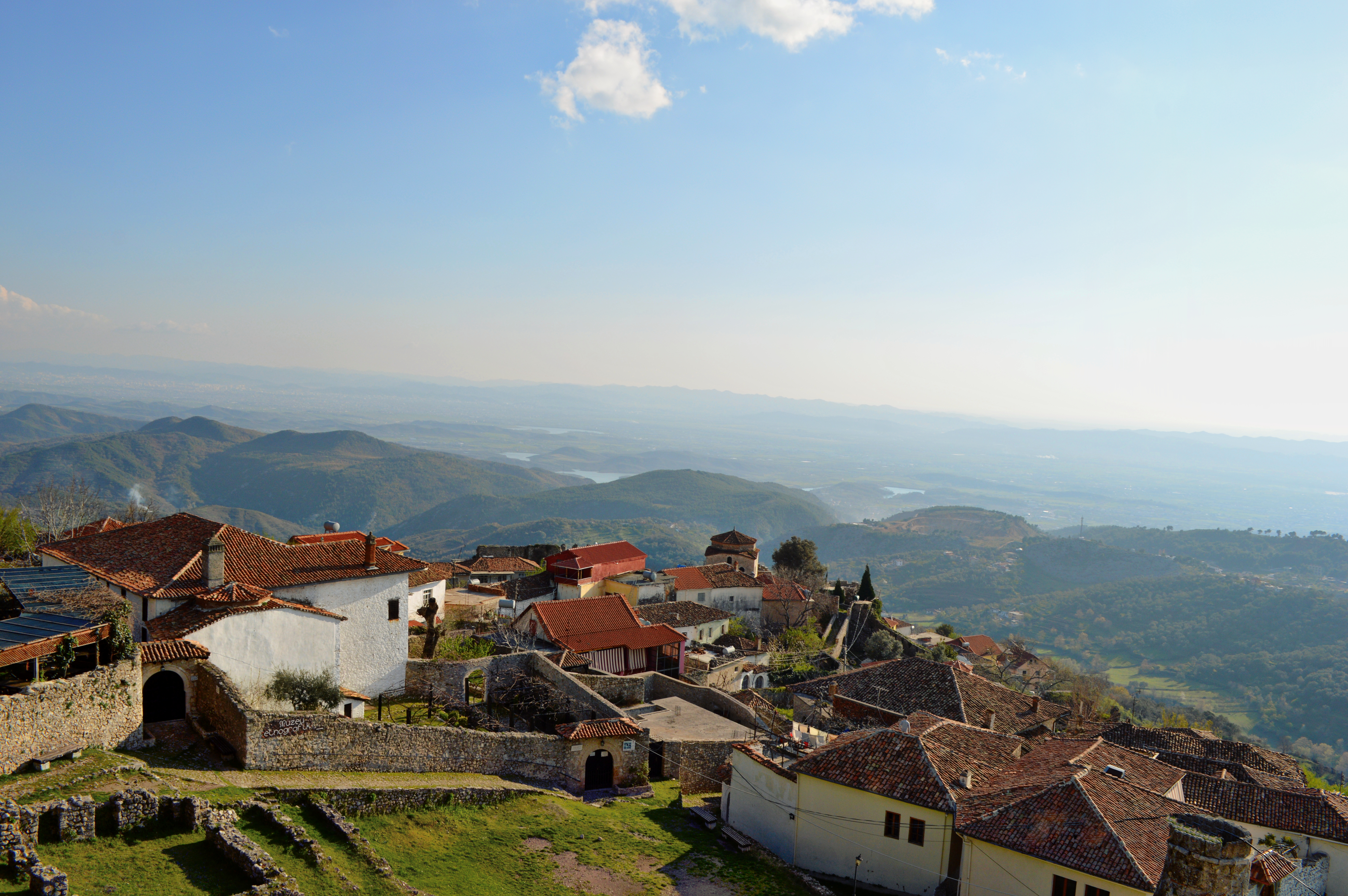
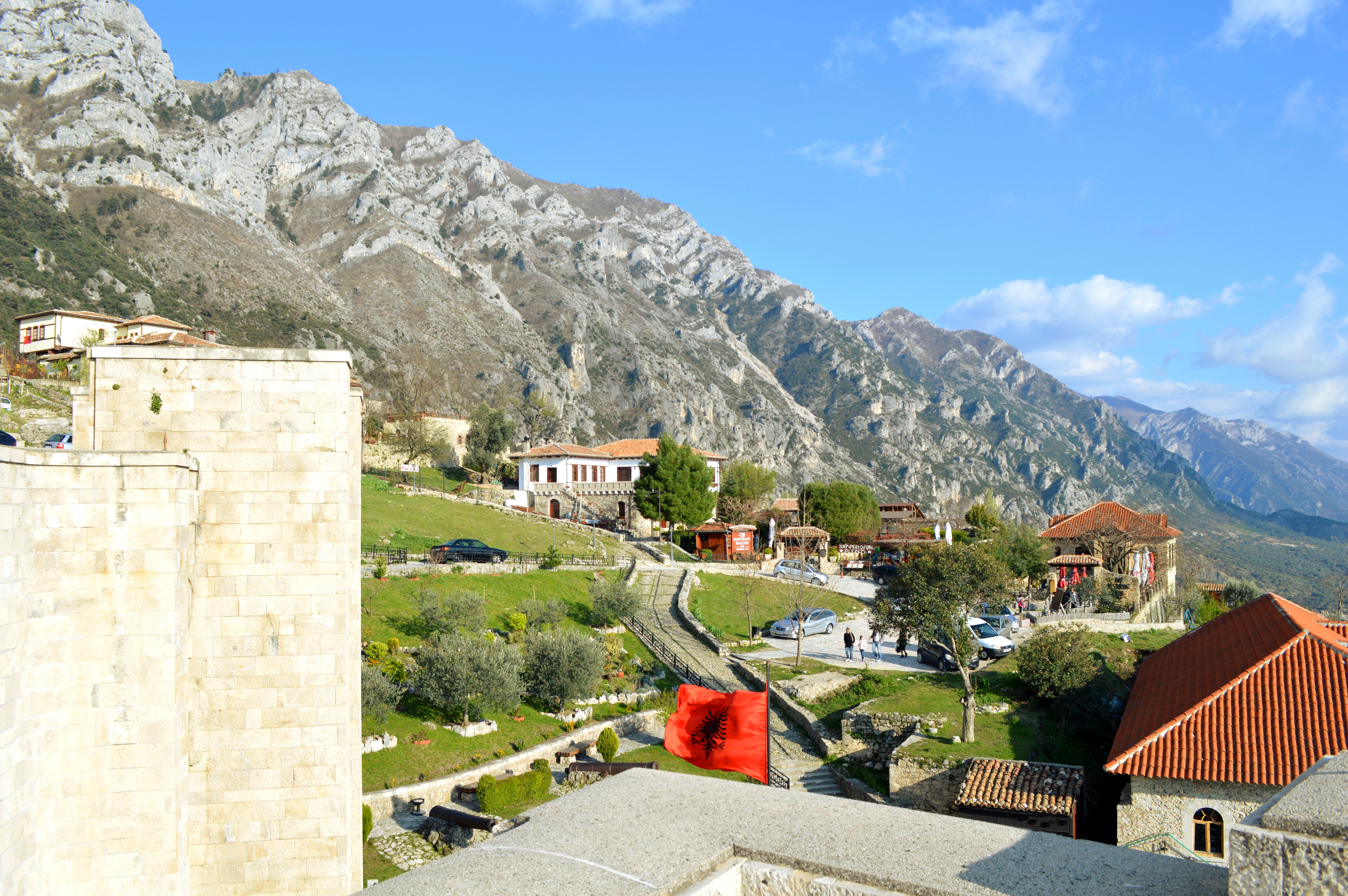
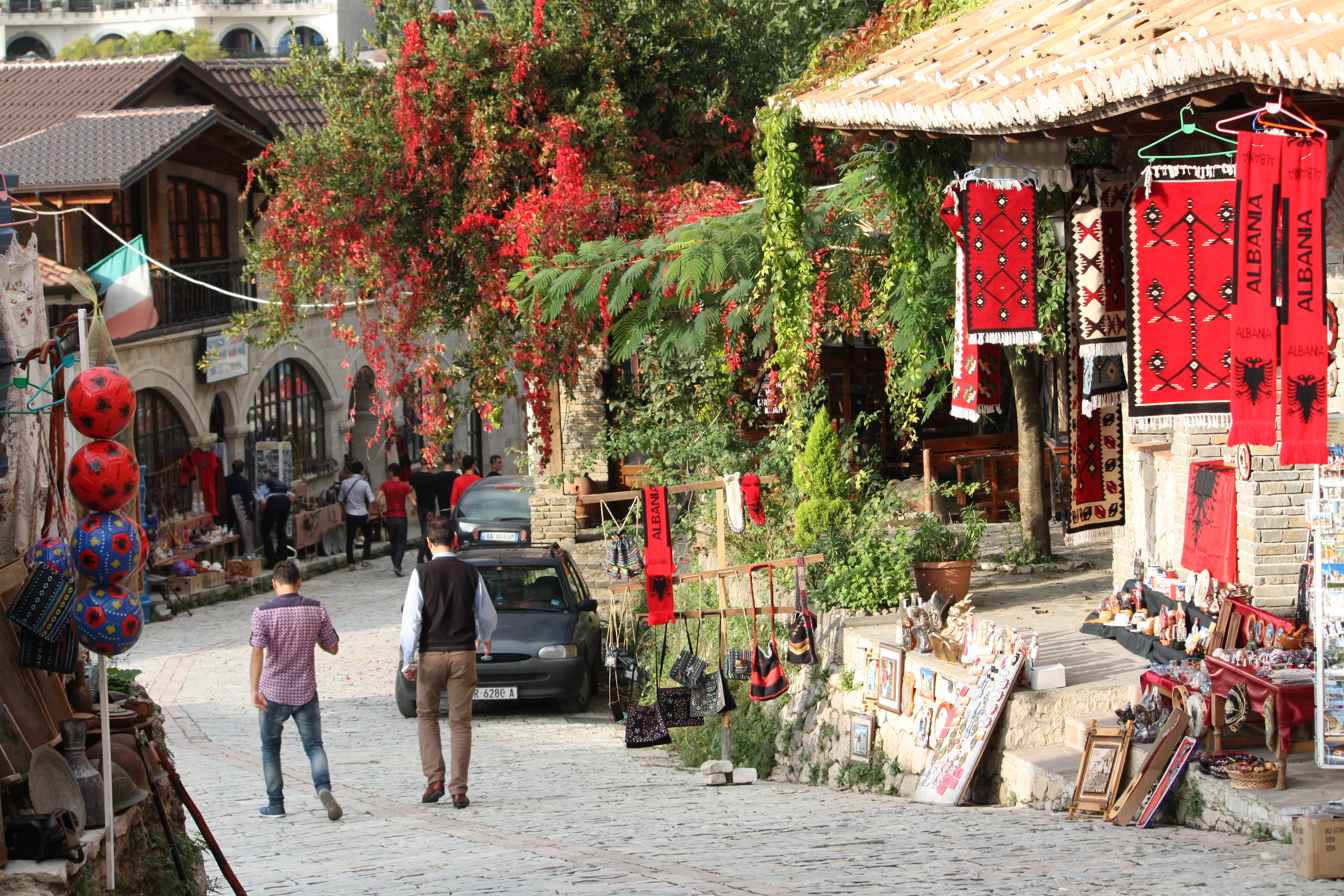
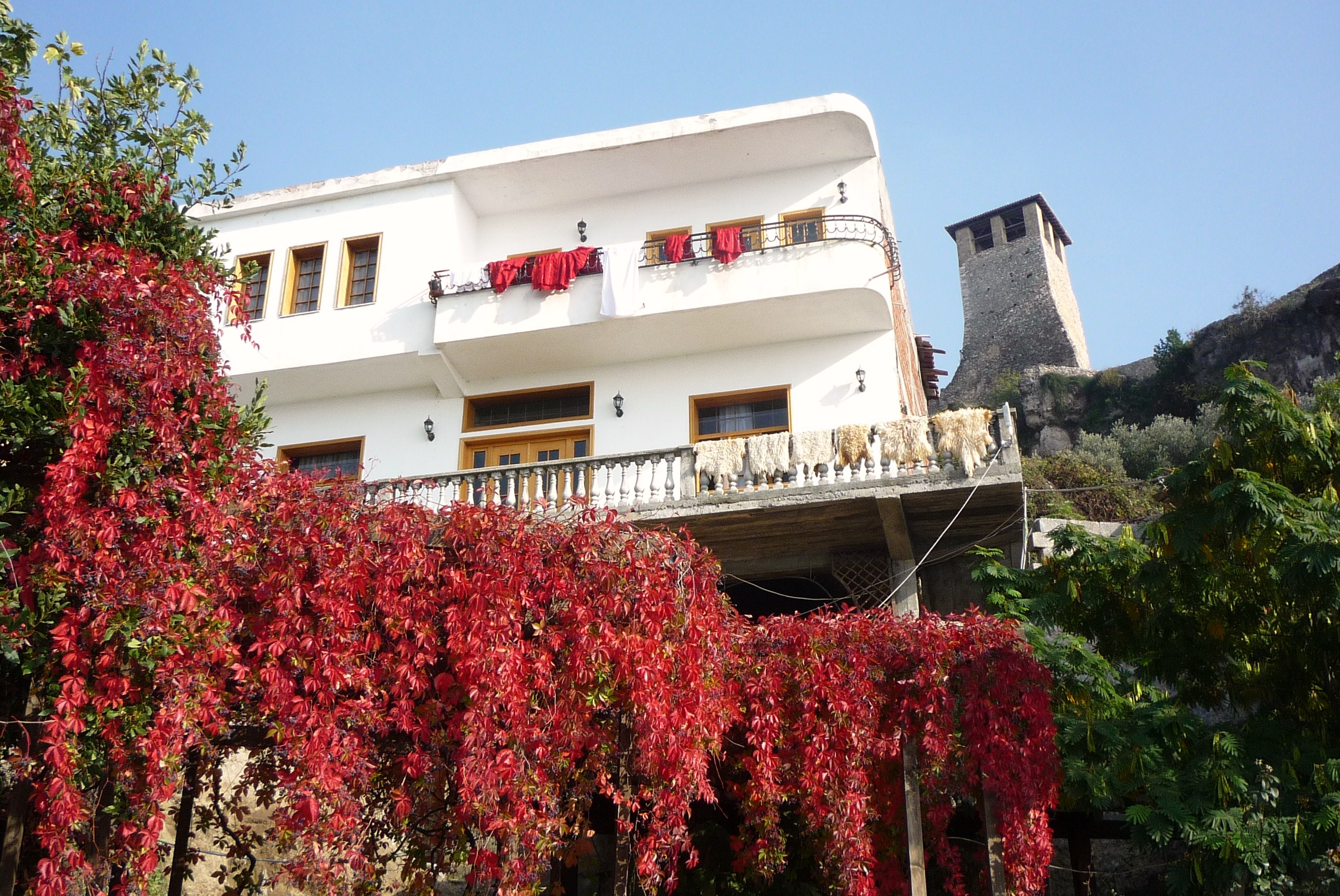
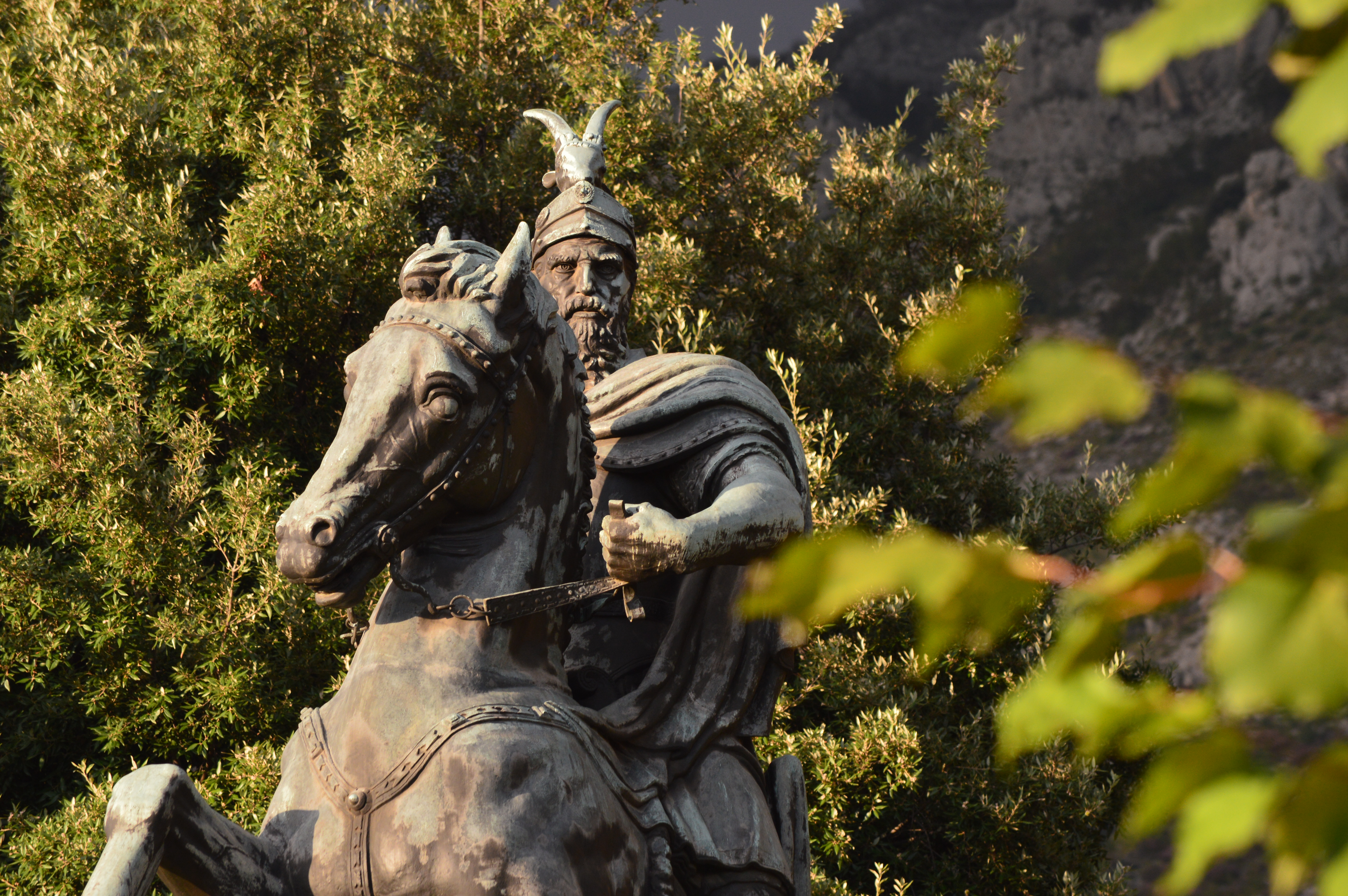

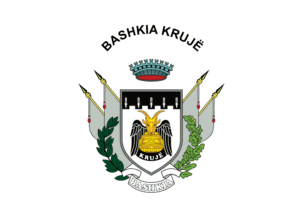
- Flag Emblem

- Location within Albania
- Coordinates: 41°30′39″N 19°47′33″E
- Country: Albania
- County: Durrës

Government
  - Mayor: Artur Bushi (PS)

Area
  - Municipality: 339.02 km^{2} (130.90 sq mi)
  - Administrative unit: 45.73 km^{2} (17.66 sq mi)
- Elevation: 600 m (2,000 ft)

Population (2023)
  - Municipality: 51,191
  - Municipality density: 151.00/km^{2} (391.08/sq mi)
  - Administrative unit: 8,921
  - Administrative unit density: 195.1/km^{2} (505.3/sq mi)
- Demonym(s): Albanian: Krutan (m), Krutane (f)
- Time zone: UTC+1 (CET)
  - Summer (DST): UTC+2 (CEST)
- Postal Code: 1501
- Area Code: (0)511
- Website: kruja.gov.al

Krujë (Albanian definite form: Kruja; see also the etymology section) is a town and a municipality in north-central Albania. Located between Mount Krujë and the Ishëm River, the city is 20 km north of Tirana.

Krujë was inhabited by the ancient Illyrian tribe of the Albanoi. In 1190 Krujë became the capital of the first Albanian state in the Middle Ages, the Principality of Arbanon. Later it was the capital of the Kingdom of Albania, while in the early 15th century Krujë was conquered by the Ottoman Empire, but then recaptured in 1443 by Skanderbeg, leader of the League of Lezhë, who successfully defended it against three Ottoman sieges until his death in 1468.

The Ottomans took control of the town after the fourth siege in 1478, and incorporated it in their territories. A 1906 local revolt against the Ottoman Empire was followed by the 1912 Declaration of Independence of Albania. In the mid-1910s Krujë was one of the battlefields of the conflict between the short-lived Republic of Central Albania, founded by Essad Toptani, and the Principality of Albania. In 1914, Toptani managed to seize the town, but during the same year it was reincorporated by Prenk Bibë Doda in the Principality of Albania. During World War II it was the centre of the activities of resistance leader Abaz Kupi.

The museums of Krujë include the Skanderbeg Museum, located in the environs of the Krujë Castle, and the national ethnographic museum.

== Etymology ==
The name of the city is related to the Albanian word kroi, krua, meaning "fountain" or "water source", from Proto-Albanian * krana < * krasna.

The city was attested for the first time as Kroai (in Medieval Greek Κροαί) in Byzantine documents of the early 9th century. In medieval Latin it was known as Croia, Croya and Croarum. During the Ottoman era it was also known as Ak Hisar or Akçahisar from the Turkish words ak (white) and hisar (castle).

== History ==
=== Early history ===
In ancient times the region of Krujë was inhabited by the Illyrian tribe of the Albani, while the town is located near the Iron Age Illyrian site of Zgërdhesh. Some scholars have identified the site with the main settlement of the Albani, Albanopolis, while others identified Albanopolis with Krujë itself. During the Illyrian Wars the area of Krujë was captured by the Roman Republic.

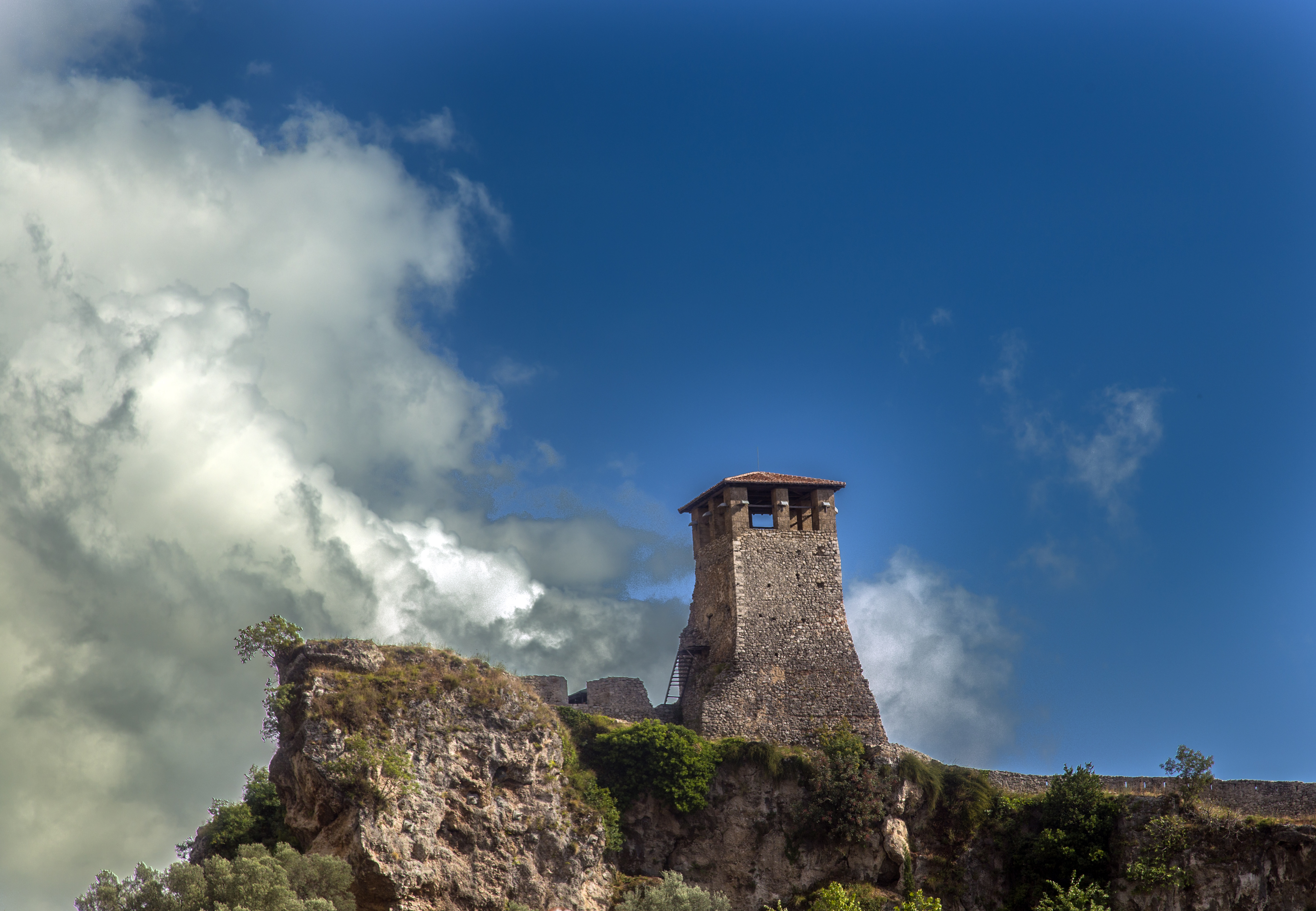
Krujë Castle is a major landmark located on the highest point of Kruje

Early medieval artifacts of Krujë include dress items and weaponry found in fifth- and sixth-century cemeteries, which display the high status and the wealth of the burials. Originally a middle-sized fortress like other urban centers, Krujë expanded to a town probably from the sixth to the ninth century AD. In 1190 Krujë became the capital of the first Albanian state of the Middle Ages, the Principality of Arbër founded by Progon of the House of Progon. During the reign of Gulam of Albania the principality was dissolved and incorporated in the newly founded Kingdom of Albania. The Kingdom of Albania was eventually dissolved between 1363 and 1368, when Karl Topia captured its capital Durrës and incorporated its territories, including Krujë in 1363 in the Princedom of Albania. After 1389 the House of Thopia gradually lost control of the town, which by 1395 had come under Ottoman vassalage. The Ottomans lost control of Krujë in the early 15th century, when it was captured by Niketa Thopia and regained it in 1415. After its recapture it was incorporated in the Sanjak of Albania and formed an administrative unit with the status of Subaşilik as attested in the regional register of 1431. During the Albanian Revolt of 1432–1436 the city was unsuccessfully besieged by Andrea Thopia.

Until 1432, the subaşi (governor) of Krujë had been Zagan Bey, then Hizir Bey, and later during 1437—1438 Skanderbeg was its governor. In November 1438 Hizir Bey was again appointed as subaşi of Krujë until he was replaced in April 1440 by Umur Bey. On 28 November 1443 Skanderbeg gained control over Krujë by deceiving its subaşi with forged sultan's letter, and raised the first Albanian flag on the same day. In 1444 Skanderbeg incorporated it in the League of Lezhë, the confederation of the Albanian principalities.

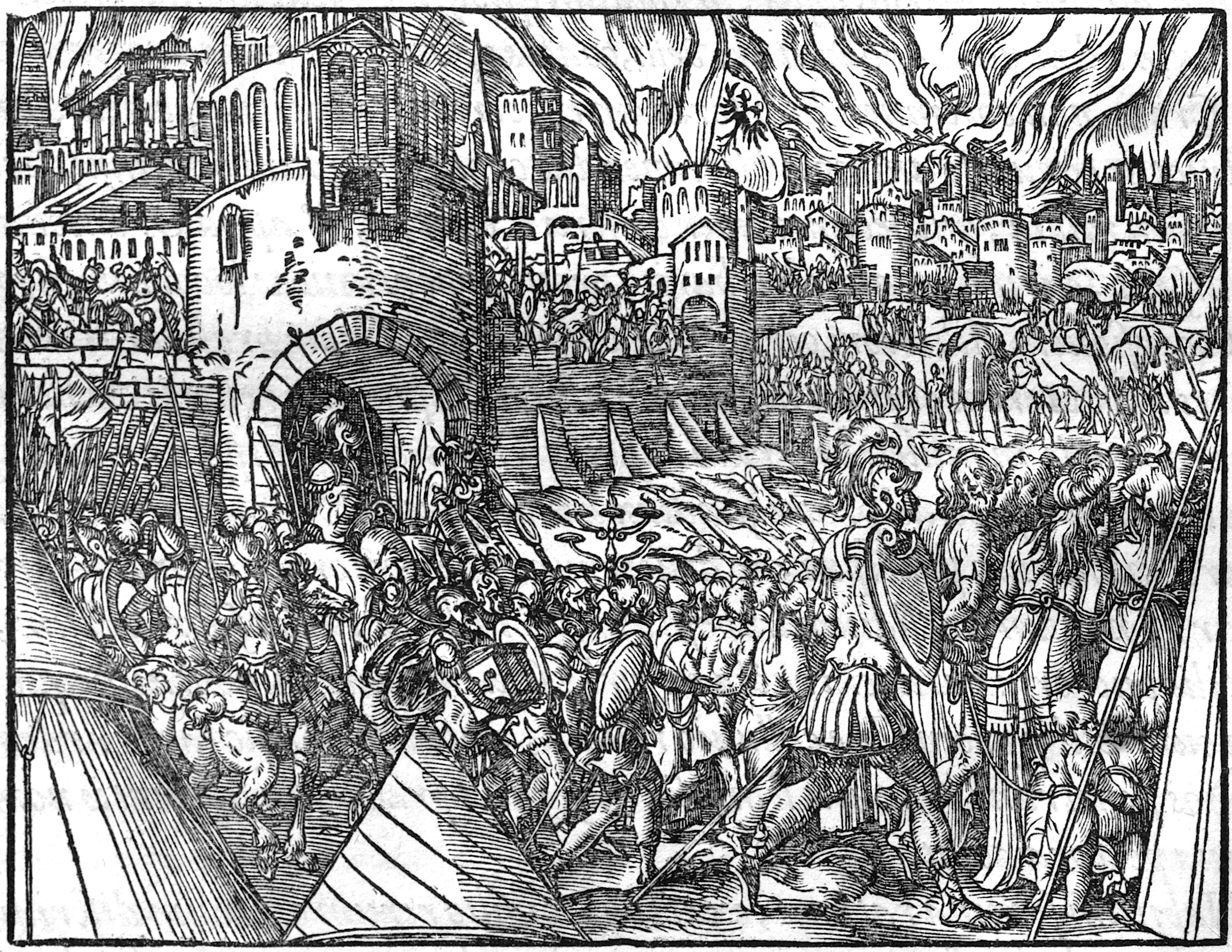
Woodcut of the first siege of Krujë by Jost Amman (1578)

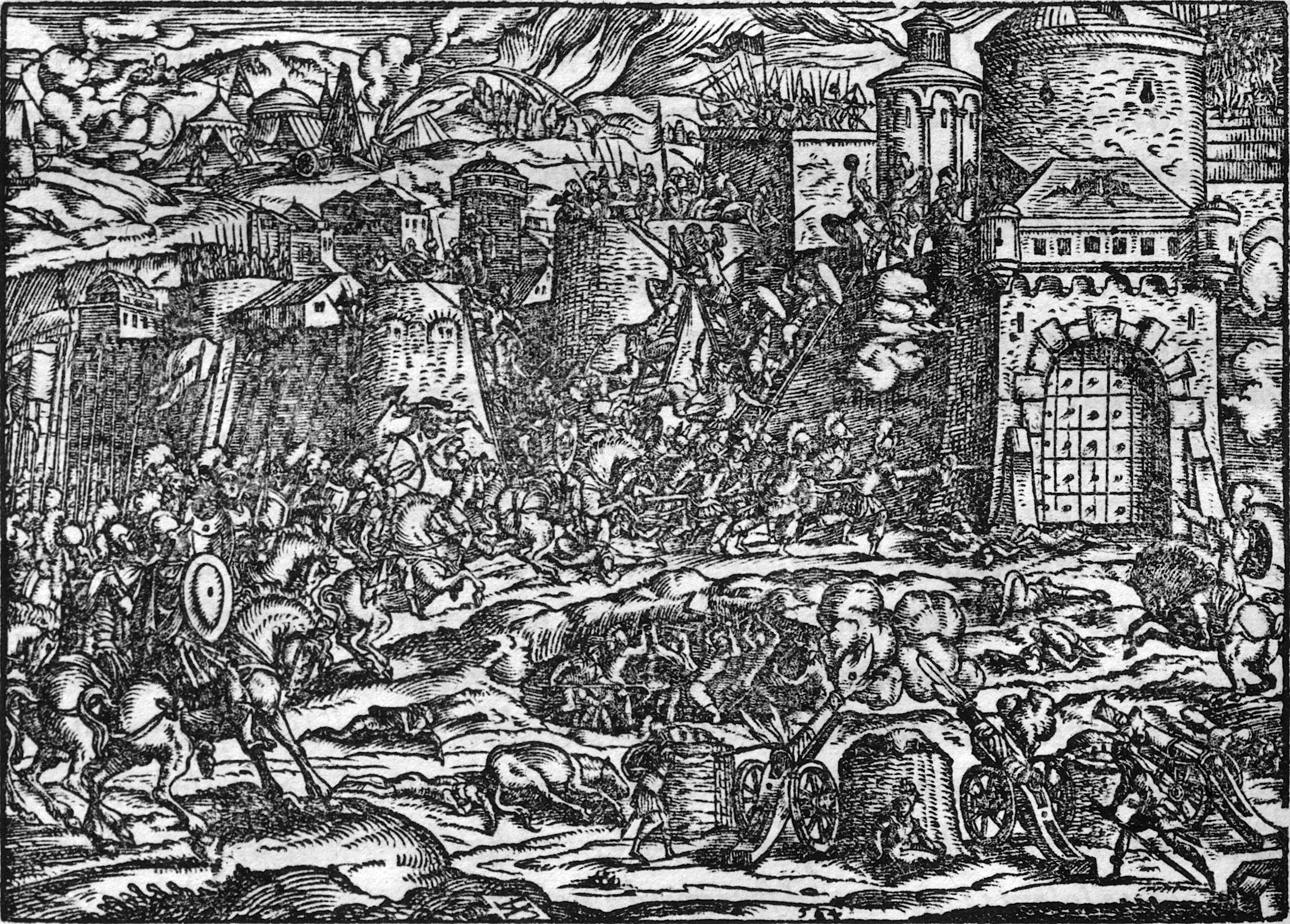
Woodcut of the second siege of Krujë by Jost Amman

From 1450 until 1477 Krujë was defended successfully by the Albanian troops four times against the Ottoman army, which eventually captured it in 1478 during the fourth Siege of the city. During the first siege of Krujë in 1450, the 1,500 to 2,000 soldiers of the League of Lezhë under Vrana Konti and Skanderbeg defeated an Ottoman force of about 100,000 men led by Sultan Murad II, who had tried to bribe Konti to surrender the castle of the town. In the following decade Krujë was first besieged in 1466 and then in 1467 unsuccessfully by Ballaban Pasha and Sultan Mehmed II, whose total troops were about 150,000. After Skanderbeg's death in 1468, the city's garrison was supplemented by troops of the Republic of Venice. In 1476 the town was once more besieged by a ten-thousand-man army under Gedik Ahmed Pasha; however, the local garrison led by proveditor Pietro Vetturi fended off the Ottoman besiegers, who retreated after the arrival of reinforcements under Francesco Contarini and Nikollë Dukagjini. The city was eventually conquered by the Ottomans in 1478 after being besieged for over a year. This success was viewed by the Ottomans as a good omen that the siege of Shkodra would also be successful.

=== Modern history ===
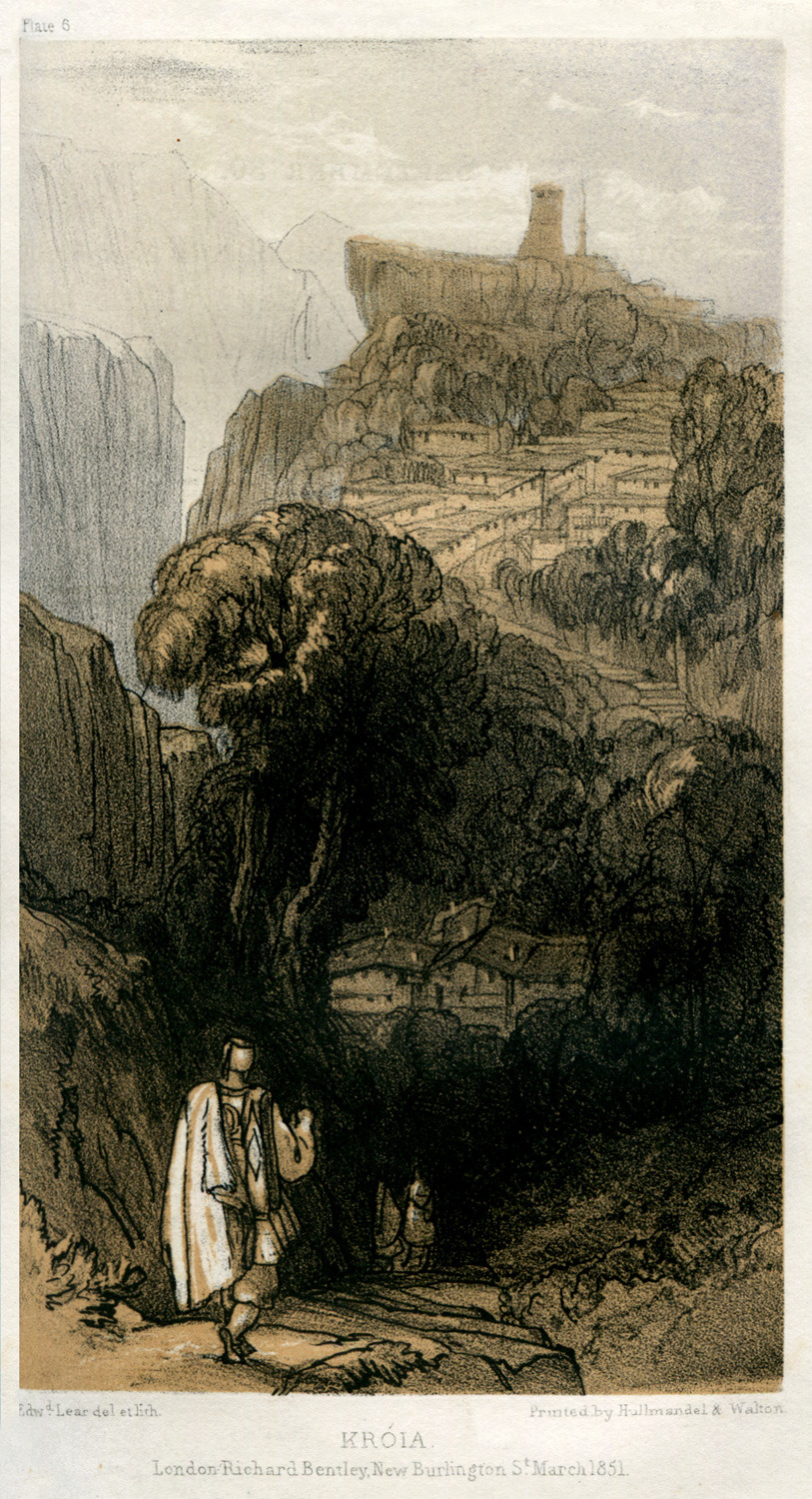
Town and fortress of Kruja depicted by Edward Lear, 30 September 1848.

During the rise of nationalism in the Ottoman Empire Krujë became the battlefield of various anti-Ottoman rebellions also related with the imposition of new taxes. In 1906 the people of Krujë revolted once more against the Ottoman Empire. The Wāli of Shkodër, Sali Zeki Pasha sent four battalions of the Ottoman army stationed in the city against the rebels of Krujë.

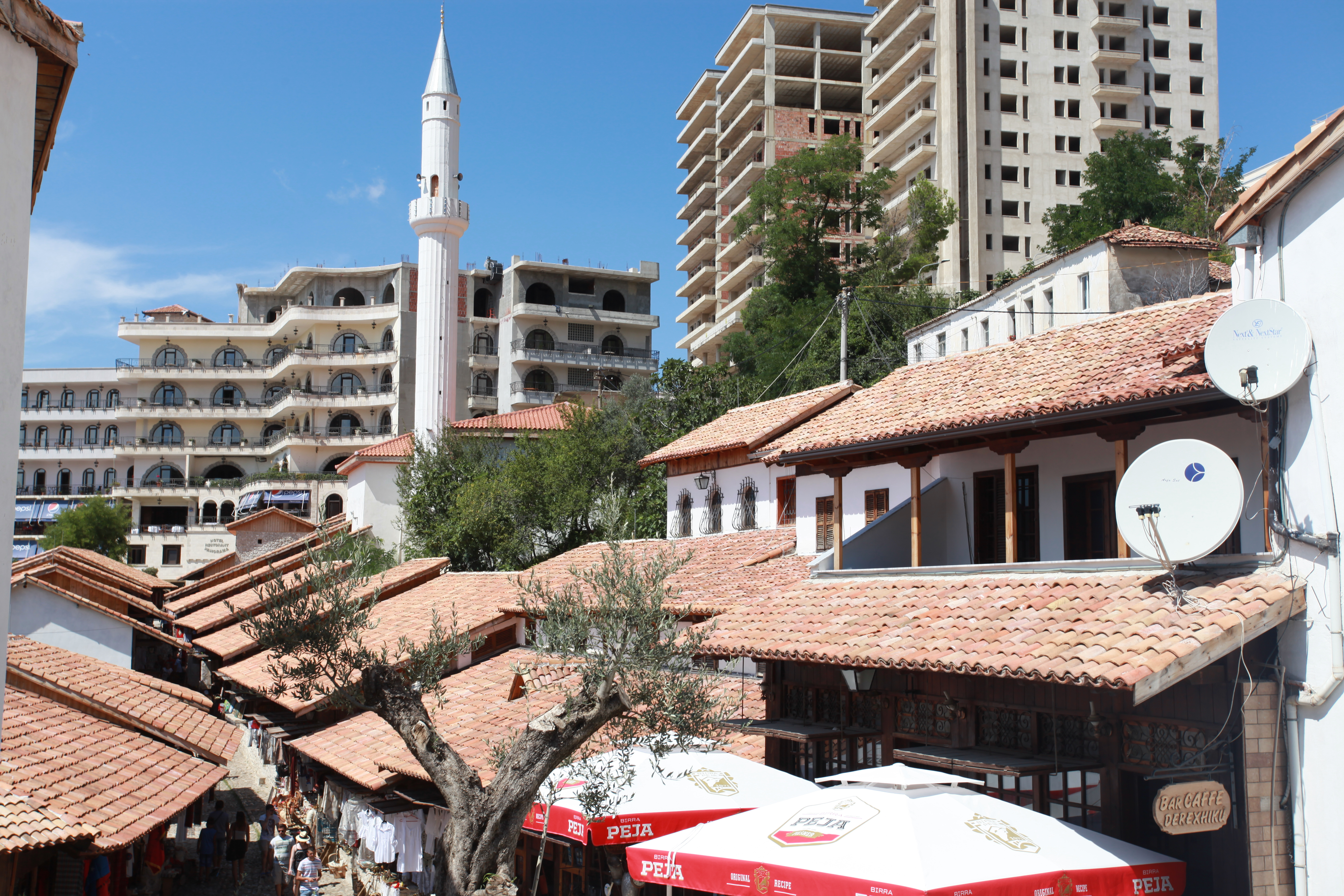
The old bazaar and the mosque of Krujë

After prolonged confrontations the Ottoman officials offered to begin negotiations with the rebels. On 20 September 1906 the leaders of Krujë and the Ottoman diplomats met at the Tallajbe quarter of Krujë to discuss the administrative status of the town, however, the Ottoman army under Şemsi Pasha ambushed the rebel leaders. During the battle that followed, which became known in history after the Tallajbe district, about 30 people died including uninvolved civilians. Throughout the Albanian Revolt of 1912, that led to the creation of the Albanian Vilayet and later in the Declaration of Independence of Albania Krujë, which was captured on 14 August, was one of the major anti-Ottoman centers. In 1914 Essad Toptani, a member of the notable Toptani family of the region and officer of the Ottoman army, captured the town and incorporated it in the Republic of Central Albania making it a center of his movement, but in June of the same year it was reincorporated by Prênk Bibë Doda in the Principality of Albania. On 20 December 1914 the local anti-Essadists, led by Abdi Toptani and Mehmet Gjinali, formed the Union of Krujë, which quickly extended its authority in central Albania.

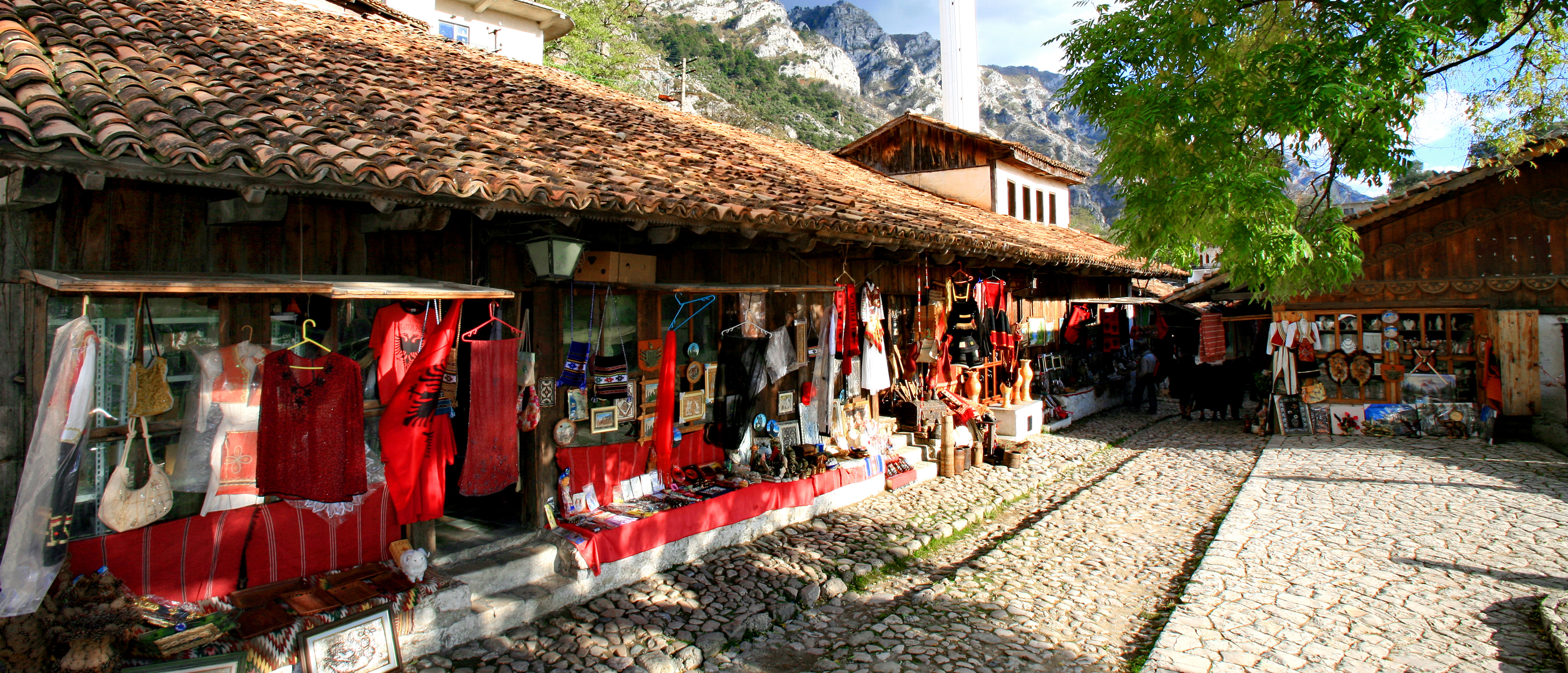
Alley of the old market

Following the Italian invasion of Albania the country became a protectorate of the Kingdom of Italy. Mustafa Merlika-Kruja, a native of Krujë, who became the Prime Minister of the new regime ordered the formation of a 300-man gendarmerie force to defend the town against resistance groups. However, soon afterward, resistance leader Abaz Kupi, another native of the town, created one of the first permanent resistance forces of Albania in Krujë and gradually took control of the region. In 1943 at the assembly of Tapizë Balli Kombëtar proposed to the LNÇ the creation of provisional resistance government, with Krujë as the capital city, but this proposal was rejected by the LNÇ leaders. In the end of November 1944, the last German troops stationed in the area were defeated and LNÇ battalions entered the town.

== Geography ==
Krujë is found at an altitude of 600 m (1,969 ft) on the foot of Mount Krujë (Albanian: Mali i Krujës), while south and west of the town is found the plain of the Ishëm River. The town is located in the northern part of the outer Albanides tectonic unit, which consists of anticlines of Mesozoic carbonate platforms. The administrative centre of the municipality is the town of Krujë, but it also includes the villages of Barkanesh, Brre and Picerragë. The closest cities to Krujë are Tirana and Durrës at a distance of 20 and 37 km respectively.

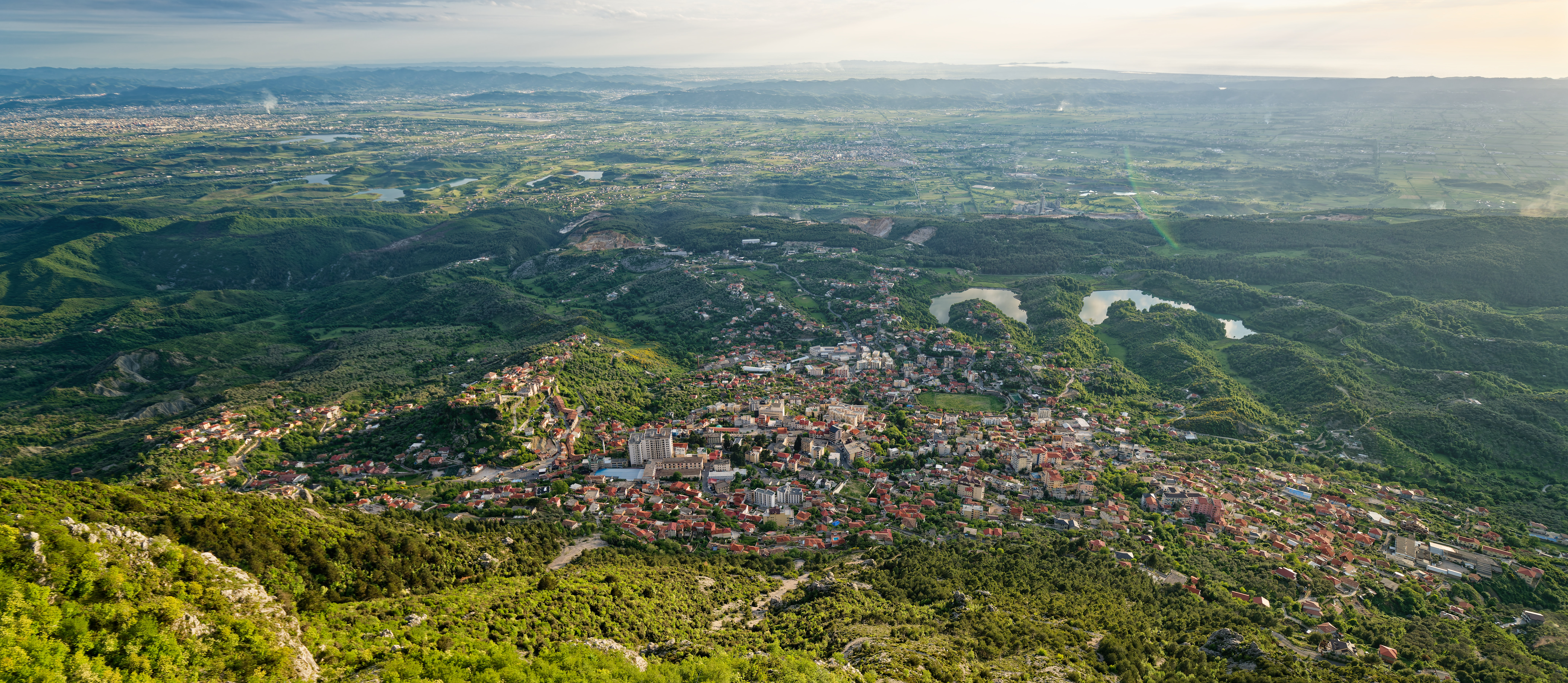
Panorama of Krujë - seen from Mali i Krujës

The municipality was formed at the 2015 local government reform by the merger of the former municipalities Bubq, Cudhi, Fushë-Krujë, Krujë, Nikël and Kodër-Thumanë, that became municipal units. The seat of the municipality is the town Krujë.

The current mayor of Krujë is Artur Bushi, who was elected in the 2015 local elections as a candidate of the Socialist Party of Albania.

=== Climate ===
Krujë has an oceanic climate (Köppen climate classification: Cfb) with warm summers, cool winters, and abundant precipitation.

Climate data for Krujë
| Month | Jan | Feb | Mar | Apr | May | Jun | Jul | Aug | Sep | Oct | Nov | Dec | Year |
|---|---|---|---|---|---|---|---|---|---|---|---|---|---|
| Mean daily maximum °C (°F) | 7.2 (45.0) | 8.5 (47.3) | 11.5 (52.7) | 15.4 (59.7) | 20.3 (68.5) | 24.3 (75.7) | 26.9 (80.4) | 26.9 (80.4) | 23.2 (73.8) | 17.8 (64.0) | 12.7 (54.9) | 8.8 (47.8) | 17.0 (62.5) |
| Daily mean °C (°F) | 3.8 (38.8) | 5.0 (41.0) | 7.4 (45.3) | 11.0 (51.8) | 15.5 (59.9) | 19.3 (66.7) | 21.6 (70.9) | 21.5 (70.7) | 18.0 (64.4) | 13.4 (56.1) | 9.2 (48.6) | 5.5 (41.9) | 12.6 (54.7) |
| Mean daily minimum °C (°F) | 0.5 (32.9) | 1.6 (34.9) | 3.4 (38.1) | 6.6 (43.9) | 10.7 (51.3) | 14.3 (57.7) | 16.3 (61.3) | 16.1 (61.0) | 12.9 (55.2) | 9.1 (48.4) | 5.7 (42.3) | 2.2 (36.0) | 8.3 (46.9) |
| Average precipitation mm (inches) | 143 (5.6) | 127 (5.0) | 112 (4.4) | 101 (4.0) | 90 (3.5) | 60 (2.4) | 41 (1.6) | 49 (1.9) | 82 (3.2) | 117 (4.6) | 168 (6.6) | 153 (6.0) | 1,243 (48.8) |

== Demographics ==
Historical population
| Year | Pop. | ±% |
|---|---|---|
| 1950 | 5,269 | — |
| 1960 | 6,254 | +18.7% |
| 1969 | 7,200 | +15.1% |
| 1979 | 9,600 | +33.3% |
| 1989 | 13,748 | +43.2% |
| 2001 | 13,075 | −4.9% |
| 2011 | 11,721 | −10.4% |
| 2023 | 8,921 | −23.9% |

The total population of Krujë is 51,191 as of the 2023 census, in a total area of 339.20 km^{2}. The population of the municipal unit is 8,921.

In 1922 the Director General of Health Services appointed the first director of health services in Krujë, Ihsan Korça while the last to hold the post before the establishment of the Socialist People's Republic of Albania was Abdulla Mehmeti. The first hospital and the first polyclinic of Krujë were built in 1946 and 1948 respectively. During 1968–69 a new medical laboratory and a department of surgery were added and expanded. In 1970 the Directorate of Hygiene and Epidemiology of the district was established in the town. In 1977-9 a new hospital and polyclinic were built, while in 1986 the first Obstetrics and gynaecology hospital of the town was opened. In 2008 the first hospital was rebuilt and renamed after its first director Stefan Gjoni.

== Culture ==
=== Religion ===
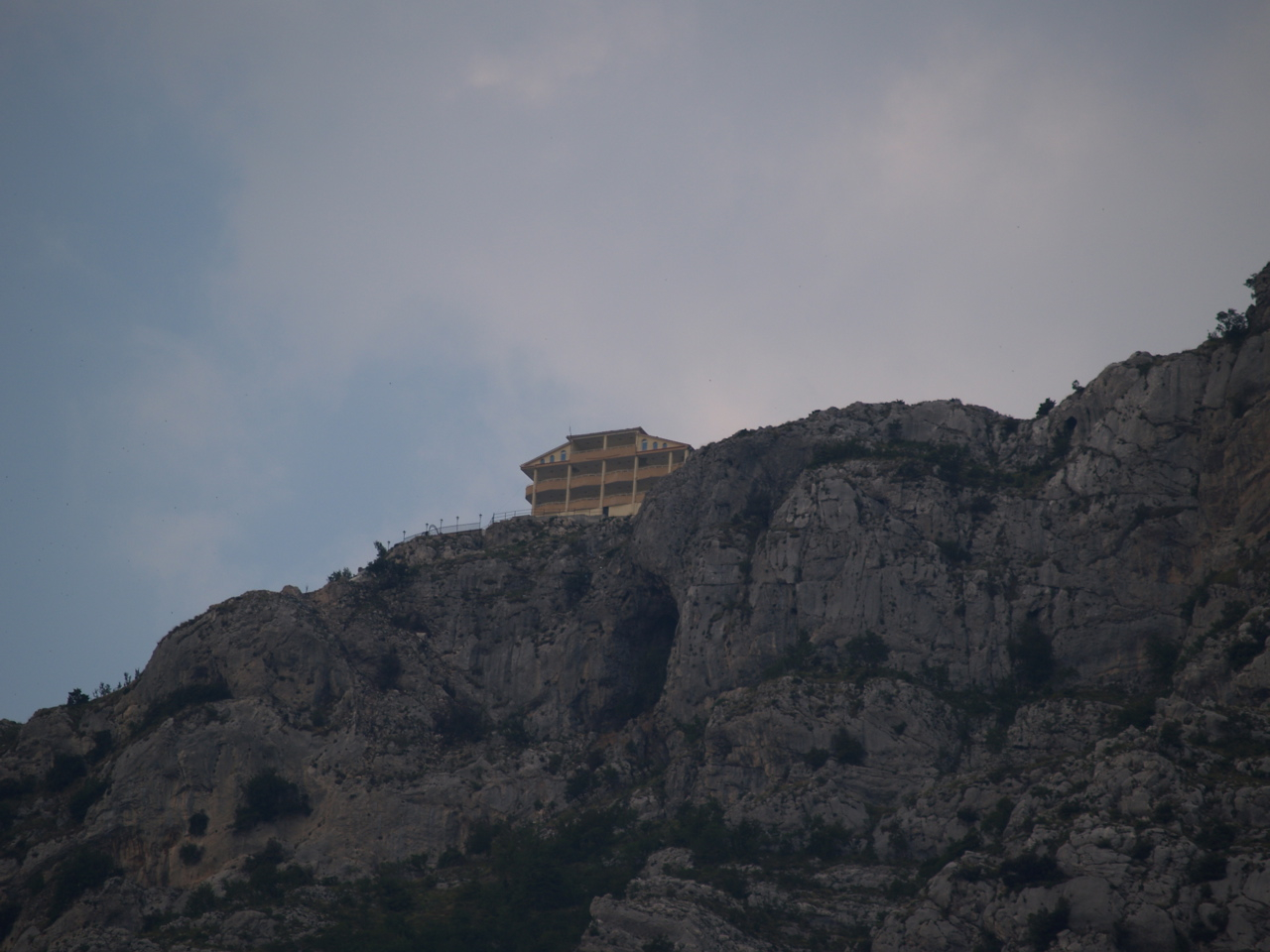
Sari Saltik on top of Mt Kruja

In antiquity Krujë was a site used for pagan rituals, while after the spread of Christianity a church dedicated to Saint Alexander was built near Mount Krujë. In the late 9th century David of Krujë is mentioned as one of the bishops, who participated in the Fourth Council of Constantinople. In the early 10th century Krujë had an Eastern Orthodox suffragan bishop, subject to the metropolitan bishop of Durrës. The Roman Catholic bishopric of Krujë was established in 1167, when its bishop was consecrated by Pope Alexander III. In 1284 the Byzantine Empire expelled the Catholic bishop of Krujë, while after Stefan Uroš II Milutin captured the town, he also expelled the Catholic bishop Andreas Croensis in 1317.

In Illyricum Sacrum Daniele Farlati documented fourteen Catholics bishops of the town from 1286 to 1694, while Konrad Eubel documented four additional bishops. Bektashism was introduced in the region of Krujë in the early 18th century. During the Ottoman era a tekke dedicated to the Bektashi saint Sari Saltik was built near the church of Saint Alexander. In 1789–99 the Dollma tekke was built by the Dollma family near the castle. In 1807 Sheikh Mimi, sent by Ali Pasha to Krujë founded another tekke in the town. However, Sheikh Mimi was executed by Kaplan Pasha, who destroyed the tekke, which was restored by Baba Husayn of Dibër in the mid-19th century. In the early 20th century, Hasluck wrote that the population of Krujë ("Croia") appeared to be almost entirely Bektashi.

=== Museums ===
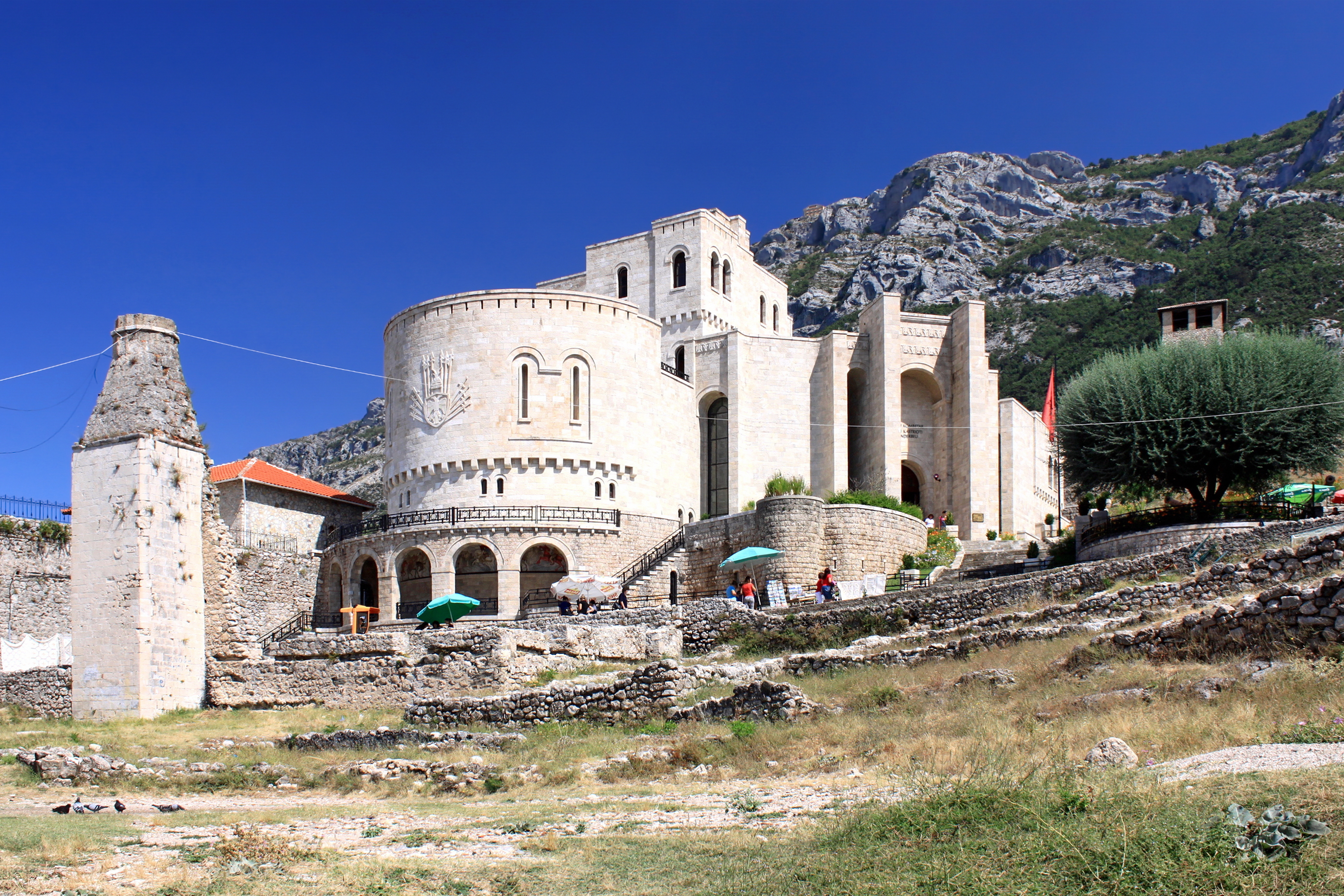
Skanderbeg Museum with the Fatih Sultan Mehmet mosque in the front

The museums of Krujë include the Skanderbeg Museum and the national ethnographic museum. The Skanderbeg Museum, founded in 1982, was built in the environs of the Krujë Castle. Its collection includes mostly 15th century artefacts related to the Albanian-Ottoman wars, during which the castle was besieged four times by the Ottoman army. The national ethnographic museum of Krujë was founded in 1989 and is located in a 15–6-room villa of the Toptani family built in 1764. The main exhibits of the museum are objects of artisanship, whose age varies from 60 to 500 years.

=== Sports ===
Krujë's most important football club is KS Kastrioti, founded in 1926 and briefly renamed as Puna Krujë in 1951. The club's home ground is Kastrioti Stadium, which has a capacity of 8,500 people.

== Notable people ==
- Mustafa Merlika-Kruja – Prime Minister of Albania
- Abaz Kupi – Albanian military officer
- Ali Riza Dede, second Dedebaba of the Bektashi Order
- Mimoza Ahmeti – Albanian woman poet
- Jurgen Bardhi – Albanian professional footballer
- Megi Luka – Albanian model and beauty pageant titleholder who was crowned Miss Universe Albania 2015
- Gjergj Kastrioti, also known as Skanderbeg - Albanian national hero, who led a rebellion against the Ottoman Empire
- Gentian Selmani (born 9 March 1998 in Krujë) is an Albanian professional footballer who plays as a goalkeeper for Albanian club Tirana and the Albania national football team.
- Drita Ziri (born 26 May 2005 in Fushë-Krujë) - Miss Earth 2023 winner, the first Albanian to win the pageant as the youngest titleholder at age of 18, and the first Albanian woman to win one of the Big Four international beauty pageants.

== Twin towns – sister cities ==
Krujë is twinned with:

- Cortona, Italy
- Portocannone, Italy
- Stari Grad, Sarajevo Bosnia and Herzegovina

== Sources ==
- Birge, John (1994). Encyclopedia of world art. Luzac Oriental. ISBN 1-898942-00-5.
- Elsie, Robert (2004). Historical dictionary of Albania. Scarecrow Press. ISBN 978-0-8108-4872-6. Archived from the original on 28 November 2023.
- Fischer, Bernd Jürgen (1999). Albania at war, 1939–1945. Purdue University Press. ISBN 978-1-55753-141-4. Archived from the original on 28 November 2023.
- Frashëri, Kristo (2002), Gjergj Kastrioti Skënderbeu: jeta dhe vepra, 1405–1468 (in Albanian), Tirana: Botimet Toena, ISBN 99927-1-627-4, archived from the original on 28 November 2023
- Gibb, Hamilton Alexander Rosskeen (1970). The Encyclopaedia of Islam. Brill Archive.
- Hardin, A. F. (2000). European societies in the bronze age. Cambridge University Press. ISBN 0-521-36729-8.
- Historia e Popullit Shqiptar. Academy of Sciences of Albania. 2002. ISBN 99927-2-960-0.
- Jaques, Tony (2007). Dictionary of battles and sieges: a guide to 8,500 battles from antiquity through the twenty-first century. Greenwood Publishing Group. ISBN 978-0-313-33538-9. Archived from the original on 16 January 2023.
- Lala, Etleva; Gerhard Jaritz (2008). "Regnum Albaniae and the Papal Curia" (PDF). Central European University. p. 32. Archived (PDF) from the original on 9 October 2022.
- Myers, Samuel (1959). Encyclopedia of world art. McGraw-Hill. ISBN 0-521-36729-8.
- "National Agency of Tourism of Albania". Archived from the original on 25 July 2011.
- Norris, H. T. (1993). Islam in the Balkans: religion and society between Europe and the Arab world. University of South Carolina Press. ISBN 978-0-87249-977-5.
- Pearson, Owen (2006). Albania in the Twentieth Century, A History: Volume I: Albania and King Zog, 1908–39. I.B.Tauris. ISBN 978-1-84511-013-0. Archived from the original on 28 November 2023.
- Spieser, J. M.; Cutler, Anthony; Papaconstantinou, Arietta (2007). The material and the ideal: essays in medieval art and archaeology in honour of Jean-Michel Spieser. BRILL. ISBN 978-90-04-16286-0.
- Stipcevic, Aleksandas (1977). The Illyrians: History and Culture. Noyes Press. ISBN 0-8155-5052-9.
- "History of health services in the district of Krujë" (in Albanian). Directorate of the Stefan Gjoni Hospital of Krujë. Archived from the original on 23 March 2012.
- Buschhausen, Heide Brigitte; Buschhausen, Helmut (1976). Die Marienkirche von Apollonia in Albanien: Byzantiner, Normannen u. Serben im Kampf um die Via Egnatia. Verlag d. Österr. Akad. d. Wiss. ISBN 978-3-7001-0122-2.
