= Illyrii proprie dicti =

Illyrian tribes

Illyrii proprie dicti (lit. 'properly called Illyrians') or Illyrians proper were presumably a group of ancient Illyrian tribes. They were attested only by ancient Roman writers Pliny the Elder and Pomponius Mela, designating a people that was located on the southern Adriatic coast (around the coast of modern Albania, Bosnia and Herzegovina and Croatian coast around the Neretva, and Montenegro).

== Overview ==
Pliny the Elder in his work Natural History used the term "properly named Illyrians" (Illyrii proprii/proprie dicti) for a small group of people between Epidaurum (now Cavtat) and Lissus (now Lezhë). "... this region contained the Labeatae, Senedi, Rudini, Sasaei, Grabaei, properly called Illyrians, and Taulantii and Pyraei," he said. (Latin: ... eo namque tractu fuere Labeatae, Senedi, Rudini, Sasaei, Grabaei; proprie dicti Illyri et Taulantii et Pyraei.)

Pomponius Mela tells different details, but makes the same point: "The Parthenes and Dassaretae come first, follow the Taulanti, Enchelei, Phaeaci. From there are these (who are) properly called Illyrians." (Latin: Partheni et Dassaretae prima tenent: sequentia Taulantii, Encheleae, Phaeaces. Dein sunt quos proprie Illyrios vocant).

Many modern scholars view the 'properly called Illyrians' as a trace of the Illyrian kingdom known in the sources from the 4th century BC until 167 BC, which was ruled in Roman times by the Ardiaei and Labeatae when it was centered in the Bay of Kotor and Lake Skadar. According to other modern scholars, the term Illyrii may have originally referred only to a small ethnos in the area between Epidaurum and Lissus, and Pliny the Elder and Pomponius Mela may have followed a literary tradition that dates back as early as Hecataeus of Miletus. Placed in central Albania, the Illyrii proprie dicti also might have been Rome's first contact with Illyrian peoples. In that case, it did not indicate an original area from which the Illyrians expanded. The area of the Illyrii proprie dicti is largely included in the southern Illyrian onomastic province in modern linguistics. (Note: Mate Suić and Radoslav Katičić question the existence of a separate people of Illyrii. For them, Illyrii proprie dicti are peoples inhabiting the heartland of the Illyrian kingdom; Suić, M. (1976) "Illyrii proprie dicti" ANUBiH 11 gcbi 11, 179–197. Katičić, R. (1964) "Illyrii proprie dicti" ZAnt 13–14, 87–97 Katičić, R. (1965) "Nochmals Illyrii proprie dicti" ZAnt 16, 241–244. This view is also supported in Papazoglu, F. (1989) "L'organisation politique de l'Illyrie meridionale (A propos du livre de P. Cabanes sur "Les Illyriens de Bardylis a Genthios")" ZAnt. 39, 31–53.)

== See also ==
- Illyria
- Illyrian kingdom
- Kingdom of Dardania
- List of ancient tribes in Illyria
