= Zgërdhesh =

Archaeological site in Albania

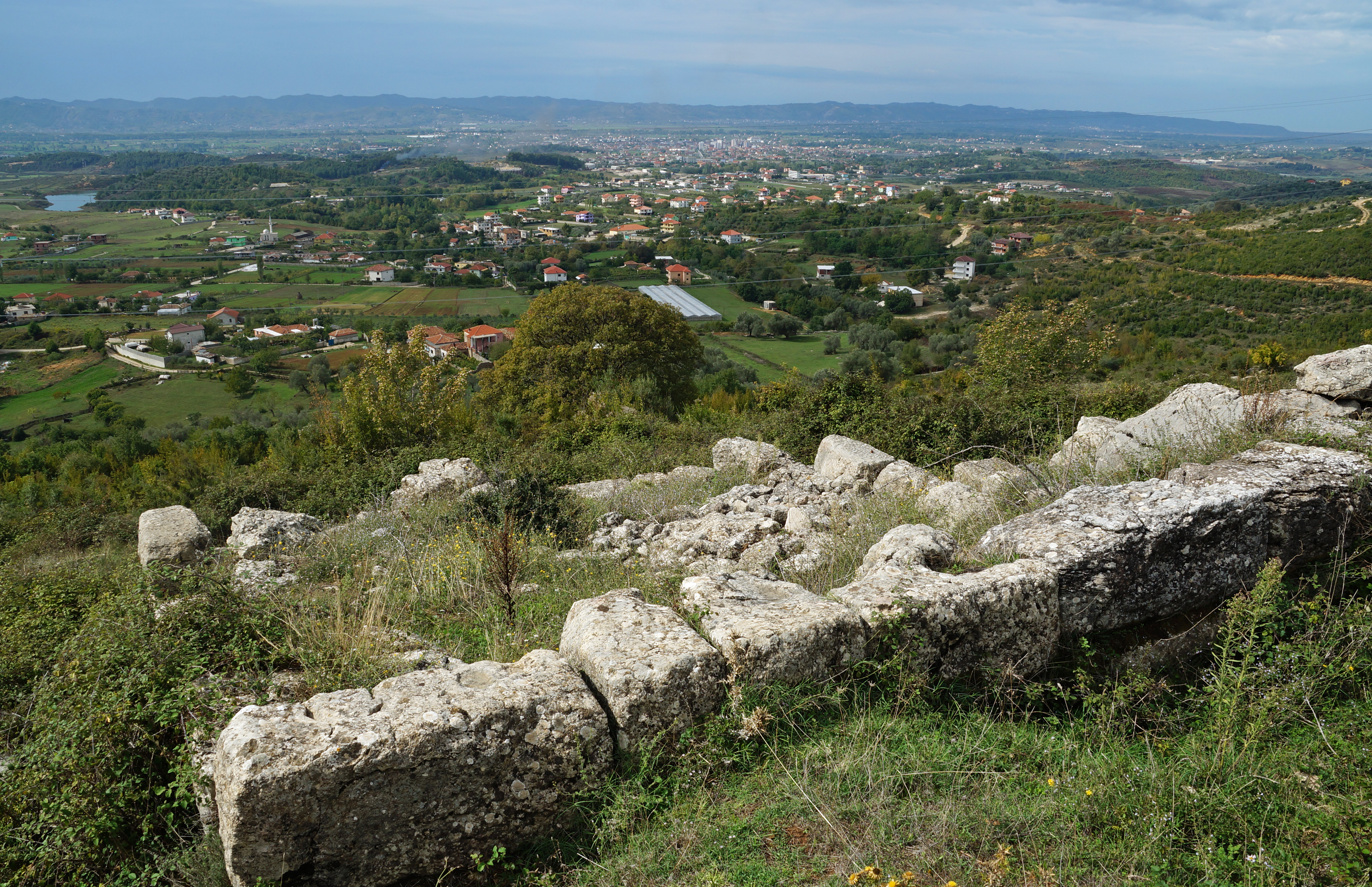
Walls of the acropolis

Zgërdhesh is an archeological site in Albania. It is located south of the road from Fushë-Kruja to Kruja. Zgërdhesh is somewhat of a mystery because it is unmentioned in ancient sources. Some scholars believe, however, that it may be the site of ancient Albanopolis, referred to by Ptolemy. The Illyrian settlement here seems to have been founded in the 7th or 6th century BC and flourished in the 4th and 3rd centuries, before being abandoned in the 2nd century BC, when the inhabitants moved to Durrës and Lezha.

== Name ==
The toponym Zgërdhesh first occurs in 1431, in a Turkish document as Ozgurtaè, and subsequently, in 1641, in the Italian chronicle of Marco Scura as Sgurdessi. The etymology is probably a combination of zgër- and dhe with the toponymical suffix -esh, from Latin -ensis.

== History ==
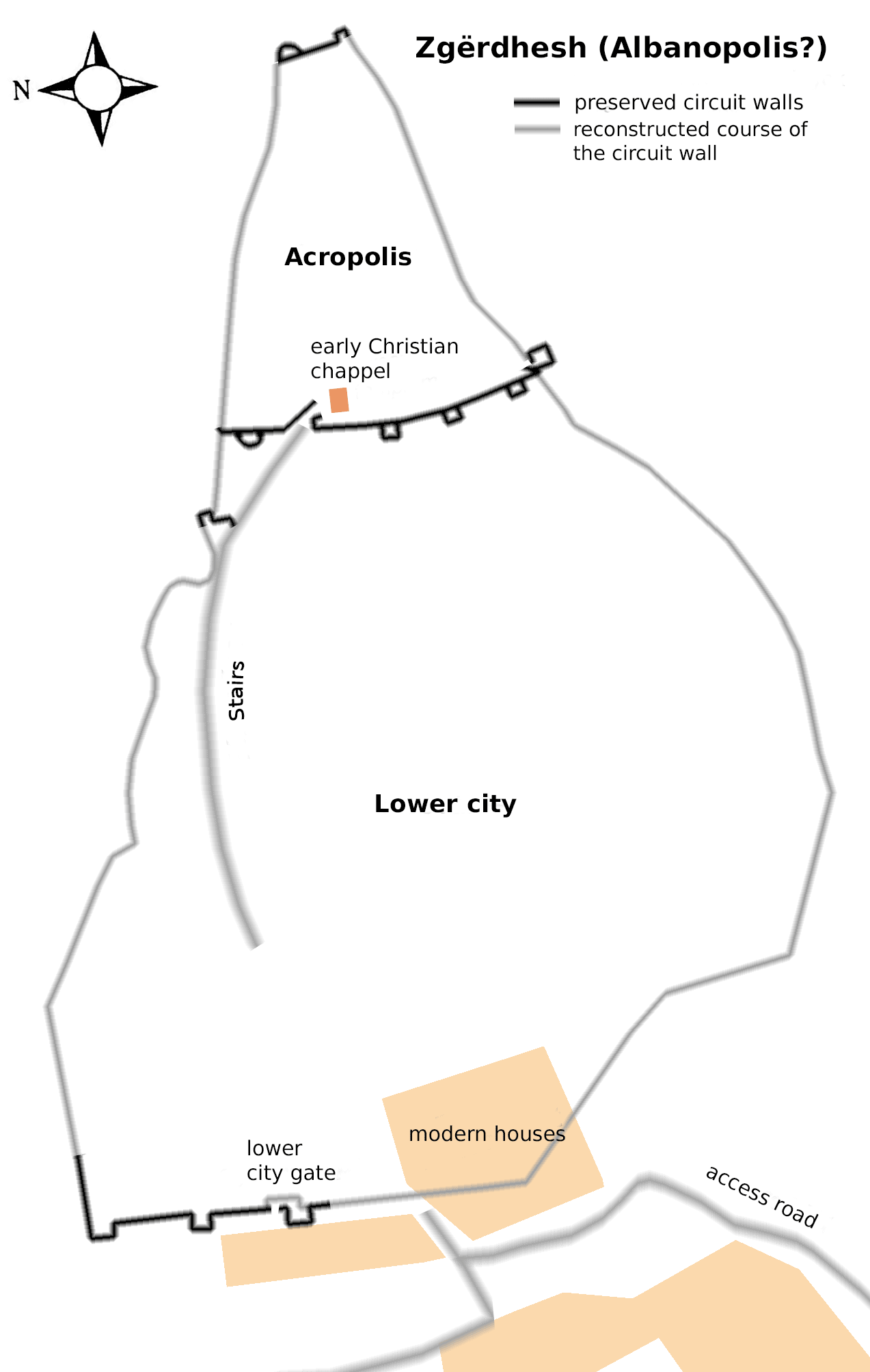
Map

It is thought that the original city had an overall area of 20 hectares. Construction originates from several periods, the first of which belongs to typical construction of the 6th century BC (blocks of stones with minimal carvings), and is typical of the construction at the top of the hill, where the first settlement must have been centered. A second construction period (5th century BC) is characterized by the use of cubical blocks, and includes the construction of most of the city walls, the towers, and the acropolis, as well as the most important buildings. Archaeological artifacts (roof tiles seals with stamps on them) are witness of at least 5 ceramic manufacturing sites, which furnished the city with roofing materials. Other manufacturing sites produced amphoras, terracottas, and different dishes found onsite. An Illyrian helmet has also been found and it is thought that they were all local products.

Commerce of the city is shown by artefacts of ceramics that were typical of Dyrrachium and Lissus, as well as coins, principally of Dyrrachium, all of which belong to the late 4th century BC through the 2nd century BC. In addition a statue of Artemis has been found, as well as various ornamental terracottas, which show the presence of a cultural life in the city. It is thought that the Illyrian Wars weakened the city and then the eventual Roman invasion caused the abandoning of the city, which has remained uninhabited since.

Among the remains at Zgërdhesh are 1,350 meters of fortification walls and heavily decayed terraces and towers spread over a hillside of 8.2 hectares. The original city was built on the acropolis but there is little to see in the way of visible remains except a section of the eastern defensive wall, with a tower on the northeast corner. Just inside the entrance are the foundations of an early Christian chapel, a very small building indicating the continued occupation of the site in later antiquity, but also its greatly diminished importance.

== See also ==
- Albanopolis
- List of ancient cities in Illyria
- List of ancient tribes in Illyria
