= List of ancient geographic names in Croatia =

This is a list of geographic names from ancient times in the current Republic of Croatia with modern names. Some of the current names refer to places that are only nearby. These include Illyrian, Ancient Greek, and Roman names.

== Regions ==
Historical name	Modern name
Borona	Banovina
Delmatia	Dalmacija
Histria	Istra
Interamnia	Slavonija
Iapudia	Lika, Gorski kotar
Liburnia	Kvarner, Northern Dalmatia
Quercia	Žumberak
Valeria	Baranja

== Towns ==
Historical name	Modern settlement
Ad Fines	Gornji Hruševec
Ad Turres	Crikvenica
Aenona	Nin
Aequum	Čitluk near Sinj
Albona	Labin
Aleta	location unknown
Aquae Balissae	Daruvar
Aquae Iassae	Varaždinske Toplice (hot springs which are still active)
Andautonia	Šćitarjevo
Andetrium, Andecium, Andretium	Gornji Muć
Apsorus, Opsara	Osor
Aquaviva	Varaždin
Arauzona	Velika Mrdakovica near Vodice
Arba	town of Rab
Argyruntum	Starigrad, Zadar County
Arupium, Arupini	Prozor (near Otočac)
Asamum, Lapida	Lapad, part of the current Dubrovnik
Asseria	near Benkovac
Assessia	Bribir, Primorje-Gorski Kotar County
Ausancalio	unknown location in inner Liburnia
Avendo	Kompolje (near Otočac)
Bariduum	location unknown
Berulia	Brela
Bigeste	Vrgorac
Billubium	Lokvičići near Imotski
Bivium	Ogulin
Blanona	possibly Biograd na Moru
Burnum	near Ivoševci
Certissa	Đakovo
Cibalae	Vinkovci
Clambetae	Cvijina Hillfort near Kruševo near Obrovac
Collentum	near Betina
Corinium	Donji Karin near Benkovac
Cornacum	Vukovar
Crepsa	town of Cres
Cuccium	Ilok
Curcum	Korenica
Enderum	unknown location in inland Dalmatia
Epetium	Stobreč
Epidaurum, Epidaurus	Cavtat
Flanona	Plomin, (Italian: Fianona) near Labin
Fulfinium, Mirine	Omišalj
Gissa, Cissa	Caska near Novalja
Halicanum	Sveti Martin na Muri
Iader, Iadera, Idassa	Zadar
Incerum	Požega
Iovia-Botivo	Ludbreg
Lacinium	location unknown
Lentula	location unknown, possibly Legrad, Letičani and or Virje
Lopsica	Sveti Juraj
Ludrum	Lovreć
Marsonia	Slavonski Brod
Metulum	Viničica hill, near Josipdol
Monetium	possibly Brinje
Muccurum, Mucurum, Aronia, Aronix, Mucrum	Makarska
Nareste	Dugi Rat
Nedinum	Nadin near Zadar
Nesactium	between the villages of Muntić and Valtura
Mursa	Osijek
Narona	Metković
Olbona	location unknown
Oneum, Almo, Onaeum	Omiš
Ortopla, Ortoplinia, Osi-Pedetae	Stinica
Pardua	Zamaslina near Ston
Pasinum	Pađene
Pietas Iulia	Pula (also Pola)
Pituntium	Podstrana
Portunata	Novalja
Promona	Promina
Raparia	Bribir, Šibenik-Knin County (also Varvaria)
Romula classica	Samobor
Ruginium, Ruvinium	Rovinj (Rovigno)
Salona	Solin
Saloniana	possibly Imotski
Scardona	Skradin
Segestica	Sisak (also Siscia by the Romans)
Senia	Senj
Setovia, Soetovio, Osinium, Sinotium	Sinj
Sicula	Kaštela
Sicum	possibly Šibenik
Siparuntum	unknown location
Stridon, Strido Dalmatiae	unknown location, possibly in Slovenia
Stulpi, Stolpum	possibly Slunj
Spalatum	Split (also called Aspalatum, Aspalathos)
Tariona	possibly Drvenik Veli
Tarsatica	Trsat
Tediastum	location unknown
Terponus	Unknown location in Karlovac County
Tilurium	Gardun, part of the town of Trilj
Tininum	Knin
Tragurion, Tragurium	Trogir
Varvaria	Bribinska Glavica near Skradin
Vegia, Vegium	near Karlobag
Volcera	Bakar

== Rivers and streams ==
Historical name	Modern name
Aquilis	Mirna
Arius	Ombla
Arsa, Arsia	Raša
Bacuntius	Bosut
Bathinus	Bednja
Bolia	Korana
Colapis	Kupa (the Romans also called it Culpa)
Danubius	Dunav (Eng. Danube)
Dravus	Drava
Formia	Dragonja
Gudesca	Gacka
Murus fluvius	Mura
Naro	Neretva
Odagra	Odra
Oenaeus	Una
Polanus	Mrežnica
Savus	Sava
Tedanius	Zrmanja
Titius	Krka
Tillurus	Cetina
Ulca	Vuka

== Populated islands ==
Historical name	Modern name
Aloepus	Olib
Apsirtis	Lošinj
Arba	Rab
Bucium	Biševo
Celadussae	Kornati (a chain of islands)
Cerosa (likely also Tauris)	Šipan
Choasa	Sušac
Colentum	Murter
Corcyra Nigra	Korčula
Crexa	Cres
Curycta	Krk
Diskelados	Brač
Eucomium	Susak
Gissa (Cissa)	Pag
Issa	Vis
Ladesta	Lastovo
Lissa	Ugljan and Pašman
Lumbricata	Vrgada
Melitussa	Mljet (was also called Melita)
Olynta	Šolta
Pamodus	Premuda
Pharos	Hvar (also Pitiea, Paros)
Pirosima	Premuda
Proteras	Prvić
Pullariae	Brijuni
Sissa	Sestrunj

== See also ==
- List of ancient cities in Illyria

== Sources ==
- Marković, Mirko (2004). Antička naselja i grčko-rimska zemljopisna imena na tlu današnje Hrvatske (in Croatian). Zagreb, Croatia: Jesenski i Turk. ISBN 9789532221718.
- Šimunović, Petar (March 2013). "Predantički toponimi u današnjoj (i povijesnoj) Hrvatskoj" [Pre-Roman placenames in present-day (and historical) Croatia] (PDF). Folia Onomastica Croatica (in Croatian) (22). Zagreb: Croatian Academy of Sciences and Arts: 147–214.
