= List of settlements in Illyria =

Cities in the ancient Balkans

This is a list of settlements in Illyria founded by Illyrians (southern Illyrians, Dardanians, Pannonians), Liburni, Ancient Greeks and the Roman Empire. A number of cities in Illyria and later Illyricum were built on the sites or close to the sites of pre-existing Illyrian settlements, though that was not always the case. Some settlements may have a double entry, for example the Ancient Greek Pola, Roman Pietas Julia, and some toponyms are reconstructed.

== Albania ==
=== Identified sites ===
Identified places and settlements in Albania.

#	Settlement (Note: Italics: the ancient names are unattested.)	Habi-tation	Location	Geographic coordinates	Ref.
1	Ad Acroceraunia		Near Llogara Pass	40°16′52″N 19°27′20″E	
2	Ad Quintum		Bradashesh	41°05′38″N 20°00′54″E	
3	Akrolissos, Lissus		Lezhë	41°46′58″N 19°38′38″E	
4	Amantia		Ploç	40°22′37″N 19°42′0″E	
5	Antipatrea		Berat	40°42′0″N 19°57′0″E	
6	Apollonia		Pojan	40°44′2″N 19°27′46″E	
7	Aulon		Vlorë	40°28′0″N 19°29′0″E	
8	Bushat		Bushat	41°58′1″N 19°31′59″E	
9	Byllis		Hekal	40°32′25″N 19°44′15″E	
10	Cerje		southeast of Vlorë	40°16′11″N 19°41′13″E	
11	Dimale		Krotinë	40°42′59″N 19°47′49″E	
12	Dukat		Dukat	40°15′11″N 19°34′02″E	
13	Enchelanae		above Pogradec,	40°54′30″N 20°38′46″E	
14	Epidamnos		Durrës	41°18′40″N 19°26′21″E	
15	Gajtan		Gajtan	42°3′23″N 19°34′20″E	
16	Grunas		Grunas	42°25′10″N 19°46′50″E	
17	Kodrion		Tac hill, Kalaja e Irmajt, Mt. Tomorr, Gramsh D.	40°51′4″N 20°6′21″E	
18	Kratul		Kratul	42°7′22″N 19°34′30″E	
19	Kukës		Kukës	42°4′51″N 20°25′12″E	
20	Lofkënd		Lofkënd	40°38′28″N 19°44′45″E	
21	Hija e Korbit		Maliq	40°42′30″N 20°42′0″E	
22	Margëlliç		Margëlliç	40°40′19″N 19°39′40″E	
23	Mat		Mat	41°37′1″N 20°0′0″E	
24	Matohasanaj		Matohasanaj	40°21′14″N 19°49′59″E	
25	Nikaia		Klos	40°31′44″N 19°45′7″E	
26	Nymphaion (sanctuary)		Selenicë	40°31′59″N 19°37′59″E	
27	Nymphaion (harbour)		Shëngjin	41°48′50″N 19°35′39″E	
28	Olympe		Mavrovë	40°24′32″N 19°35′28″E	
29	Orikon		Orikum	40°19′23″N 19°27′7″E	
30	Pelion		Pojan Korce, River Devoll	40°43′31″N 20°50′11″E	
31	Persqopi		Tirana	41°19′44″N 19°49′4″E	
32	Rabije		Rabije	40°28′55″N 19°56′21″E	
33	Redon		Cape of Rodon	41°35′2″N 19°27′0″E	
34	Scampa		Elbasan	41°6′40″N 20°4′51″E	
35	Selcë e Poshtme		Selcë e Poshtme	40°58′59″N 20°31′1″E	
36	Scodra		Shkodër	42°4′1″N 19°30′0″E	
37	Thermidava		Rosujë	42°21′0″N 20°03′36″E	
38	Thronion		Kaninë, above Vlorë	40°26′23″N 19°31′8″E	
39	Tren		Tren	40°39′58″N 21°0′0″E	
40	Triport Peninsula		north of Vlorë	40°30′05″N 19°24′43″E	
41	Zgërdhesh		Zgërdhesh	41°28′23″N 19°48′54″E	

=== Unidentified sites ===
Settlement	Description	Proposed location	Ref.
Albanopolis		Zgërdhesh	
Bargulum		near Berat	
Bassania		Pedhanë or Bushat	
Boioi		On the shore of Lake Ohrid	
Chrysondyon		—	
Creonion		—	
Damastion		—	
Gertous		—	
Kerax		On the shore of Lake Ohrid	
Parthus		Berat	
Sation		On the shore of Lake Ohrid	
Sesarethus		Near lakes Ohrid and Prespa	
Uscana		—	

== Bosnia and Herzegovina ==
=== Identified sites ===
Identified places and settlements in Bosnia and Herzegovina.

#	Settlement	Description	Location	Geographic coordinates	Ref.
1	Ad Matricem		Tarčin		
2	Ardoton	Known from ancient records as a prominent settlement of the Daesitiates, though few megalithic ruins survive.	Central Bosnia		
3	Arduba		Vranduk	44°17′34″N 17°54′14″E	
4	Aquae Sulphurae		Ilidža		
5	Bona				
6	Curicta	A fortified settlement belonging to the Delmatae.	Livno		
7	Daorson	Megalithic "cyclopean" walls resembling Mycenae. Major political and administrative center of the Daorsi.	Ošanjići near Stolac	43°5′24″N 17°56′24″E	
8	Delminium	The primary fortress and political capital of the Delmatae. It was destroyed by the Romans in 155 BC.	Tomislavgrad	43°43′0″N 17°14′0″E	
9	Hedum Kastelum		Breza	44°1′11″N 18°15′53″E	
10	Mogorjelo		Čapljina		
11	Narenta	Trading place (Greek: emporion), where Illyrian tribes actively exchanged goods with Greek merchants from the Adriatic.	near Svitava		
12	Sarnade / Seretion	Mentioned as settlements for the Pannonian and Maezaei tribes in northern Bosnia.	Prnjavor		

=== Unidentified sites ===
#	Settlement	Description	Proposed location	Geographic coordinates	Ref.
1	Bistue / Bistua Nova		Vitez or Zenica		
2	Salvia		Near Bosansko Grahovo		

== Croatia ==
=== Identified sites ===
Identified places and settlements in Croatia.

#	Settlement	Description	Location	Geographic coordinates	Ref.
1	Aenona		Nin	44°14′0″N 15°11′0″E	
2	Aequum		Čitluk/Donji Grčići	43°45′0″N 16°38′0″E	
3	Alvona		Labin	45°5′0″N 14°7′0″E	
4	Andetrium		Muć	43°41′26″N 16°29′2″E	
5	Apsorus		Osor	44°42′0″N 14°24′0″E	
6	Arba		Rab	44°45′22″N 14°45′40″E	
7	Argyruntum		Starigrad	44°17′43″N 15°26′17″E	
8	Aspálathos		Split	43°30′36″N 16°27′0″E	
9	Asseria		Near Podgrađe	44°0′36″N 15°40′4″E	
10	Burnum		Near Kistanje	44°1′5″N 16°1′33″E	
11	Colentum		Near Betina	43°49′22″N 15°36′17″E	
12	Corinium		Near Benkovac	44°06′16″N 15°38′01″E	
13	Crepsa		Cres	44°57′36″N 14°24′29″E	
14	Curicum		Krk	45°1′0″N 14°34′0″E	
15	Epetium		Stobreč	43°29′58″N 16°31′20″E	
16	Epidaurum		Cavtat	42°34′46″N 18°13′15″E	
17	Flanona		Plomin	45°8′16″N 14°10′51″E	
18	Fulfinum		Near Omišalj	45°12′42″N 14°33′15″E	
19	Iader or Idassa		Zadar	44°7′10″N 15°13′55″E	
20	Issa		Vis	43°4′0″N 16°11′0″E	
21	Lopsica		Sveti Juraj	44°55′32″N 14°55′8″E	
22	Lumbarda		Lumbarda	42°55′19″N 17°10′12″E	
23	Melaina Korkyra		Korčula	42°57′0″N 17°7′0″E	
24	Mursa		Osijek	45°33′20″N 18°41′40″E	
25	Narona		Momići	43°04′49.9″N 17°37′30.6″E	
26	Nedinum		Nadin	44°4′27″N 15°29′53″E	
27	Nesactium		Nesactium	44°55′0″N 13°58′11″E	
28	Pharos		Hvar	43°8′0″N 16°44′0″E	
29	Pola		Pula	44°52′0″N 13°51′0″E	
30	Portunata		Novalja	44°33′0″N 14°53′0″E	
31	Promona		Tepljuh	43°54′0″N 16°12′0″E	
32	Salona		Solin	43°32′22″N 16°28′59″E	
33	Senia		Senj	44°59′25″N 14°54′11″E	
34	Tilurium		Near Trilj	43°36′41″N 16°42′57″E	
35	Tragurion or Tragorium		Trogir	43°31′1″N 16°15′5″E	
36	Varvaria		Bribir	43°44′0″N 15°51′0″E	

=== Unidentified sites ===
Settlement	Description	Proposed location	Ref.
Nareste		Near Omiš	
Oneum		Omiš	
Pituntium		Podstrana	
Saloniana		Imotski	
Setovia		Sinj	
Tariona		Near Grebaštica	

== Kosovo ==
=== Identified sites ===
Identified places and settlements in Kosovo.

#	Settlement	Description	Location	Geographic coordinates	Ref.
1	Municipium Dardanorum		Soqanicë	43°3′17″N 20°48′36″E	
2	Romajë		Romajë	42°17′31″N 20°35′34″E	
3	Busavatë		Busavatë	42°34′49″N 21°32′36″E	
4	Ulpiana		Ulpiana	42°35′47″N 21°10′31″E	
5	Vindenis		Gllamnik	42°51′58″N 21°10′59″E	
6	Vlashnjë		Vlashnjë	42°12′09″N 20°39′45″E	
7	Topanicë		Topanicë	42°31′25″N 21°38′23″E	
8	Dubovc		Dubovc	42°46′37″N 20°54′37″E	
9	Dardana Fortress		Kamenica	42°35′33″N 21°33′49″E	

=== Unidentified sites ===
Settlement	Description	Proposed location	Ref.
Theranda		Suhareka or Prizren	
Siparantum	Achieved municipium status during Roman occupation	Peja	
Cërrnica	Destroyed by Celtic raids in 279 BC	Near Gjilan	

== Montenegro ==
=== Identified sites ===
Identified places and settlements in Montenegro.

#	Settlement	Description	Location	Geographic coordinates	Ref.
1	Acruvium		Kotor	42°25′48″N 18°46′12″E	
2	Anderba, Enderon		Nikšić	42°46′40″N 18°57′00″E	
3	Buthoe		Budva	42°17′16″N 18°50′35″E	
4	Doclea		Podgorica	42°28′5″N 19°15′54″E	
5	Gostilj		Gostilj	42°29′13″N 18°41′56″E	
6	Meteon		Medun	42°28′23″N 19°21′43″E	
7	Oblun		Oblun	42°22′59″N 19°08′13″E	
8	Perast		Perast	42°29′13″N 18°41′56″E	
9	Rhizon		Risan	42°30′54″N 18°41′21″E	
10	Samobor		Samobor	42°18′44″N 19°21′53″E	
11	Stara Gradina		Stara Gradina	42°49′41″N 19°17′13″E	
12	Ulkinion		Ulcinj	41°55′12″N 19°12′0″E	

=== Unidentified sites ===
Settlement	Description	Proposed location	Ref.
Lontodocla		Along the Zeta River	

== North Macedonia ==
=== Identified sites ===
Identified places and settlements in North Macedonia.

#	Settlement	Description	Location	Geographic coordinates	Ref.
1	Lychnidos		Ohrid	41°7′0″N 20°48′0″E	
2	Oaeneon, Oaeneum		Tetovo	42°0′0″N 20°58′0″E	
3	Scupi		Skopje	42°0′59″N 21°23′31″E	
4	Trebeništa		Trebeništa, Debarca	41°12′23″N 20°45′18″E	

=== Unidentified sites ===
Settlement	Description	Proposed location	Ref.
Damastion		—	

== Serbia ==
=== Identified sites ===
#	Settlement	Description	Location	Geographic coordinates	Ref.
1	Navissos, Naissus		Niš	43°19′16″N 21°53′44″E	

=== Unidentified sites ===
Settlement	Description	Proposed location	Ref.
Damastion		—	

== Illyrian settlements ==
- Epicaria of the Cavii
- Eugenium village or fort of the Partheni

== Liburnian cities ==
- Gissa or Cissa – modern Caska near Novalja
- Pasinium – unknown position in Ražanac – Vinjerac – Posedarje range
- Sidrona of the Sidrini
- Scardona
- Tarsatica – Rijeka
- Ortoplinia or Ortopula – Stinica in Municipality of Senj
- Vegia or Vegium

== Venetic cities ==
- Iramene
- Pellaon
- Palsatium
- Atina, Istria
- Caelina
- Volcera

== Roman cities ==
- Gabuleus
- Crevenia
- Corragum fortress
- Clodiana
- Marusium
- Andautonia

A very small part of the Roman province of Italia included Istria.

- Aruccia
- Arauzona
- Arba, Scardona
- Aleta, Dalmatia
- Berginium
- Ausancali
- Jader
- Herona
- Senia, Liburnia
- Adra, Liburnia
- Sicum
- Blanona, Liburnia
- Siparuntum
- Ouporum
- Iminacium
- Stulpi
- Ardotium mentioned by Pliny and Ptolemy to be at inland Liburnia
- Collentum
- Tediastum inland Liburnia, along river Tedanius
- Curcum
- Vicianum
- Velanis

== Mislocated ==
- Thermidava, placed by Ptolemy on the Lissus-Naissus route. The toponym is most probably a misreading of a settlement which most scholars in contemporary research locate near present-day Banat, Serbia.
- Quemedava mentioned by Procopius in Dardania.

== See also ==
- List of ancient tribes in Illyria
- List of ancient cities in Thrace and Dacia
- Ancient geographic names in Croatia

== Bibliography ==
- Alaj, Premtim (2019). Les habitats de l'Age du fer sur le territoire de l'actuel Kosovo (Thesis). Université de Lyon.
- Bejko, Lorenc; Morris, Sarah; Papadopoulos, John; Schepartz, Lynne (2015). The Excavation of the Prehistoric Burial Tumulus at Lofkend, Albania. ISD LLC. ISBN 978-1938770524.
- Bereti, Vasil (1993). "Gjurmë të fortifikimeve në vendbanimin në Treport / Traces de fortifications dans l'habitat à Treport". Iliria. 23: 143–159. doi:10.3406/iliri.1993.1622.
- Bodinaku, Namik (2001). "Varreza tumulare e Dukatit në rrethin e Vlorës (Gërmime 1973-74)" [The Tumulus Necropolis of Dukat in Vlora city (Excavations between 1973-74]. Iliria. 30: 9–100. doi:10.3406/iliri.2001.1724.
- Boršić, Luka; Džino, Danijel; Radić Rossi, Irena (2021). Liburnians and Illyrian Lembs: Iron Age Ships of the Eastern Adriatic. Archaeopress Publishing Ltd. ISBN 9781789699166.
- Boško, Marijan (2011). "Gradina u Ošanićima – transformacija prapovijesnoga gradinskog u urbano naselje". Histria Antiqua. 20 (20).
- Cabanes, Pierre (2008). "Greek Colonisation in the Adriatic". In Tsetskhladze, Gocha R. (ed.). Greek Colonisation: An Account of Greek Colonies and Other Settlements Overseas. Vol. 2. Brill. pp. 155–186. ISBN 9789047442448.
- Catani, Lorenzo (2008). "Arheološko-povijesne bilješke o Castellum Tariona u rimsko doba" [Archaeological and historical notes on the Castellum Tariona in the Roman Era]. Vjesnik Za Arheologiju I Povijest Dalmatinsku (in Croatian and English). 101 (1). Split: 75–86.
- Ceka, Neritan (2009). "Atintanët: një rivështrim mbi territorin dhe historinë e tyre / Les Atintanes, un nouvel aperçu de leur territoire et de leur histoire". Iliria. 34: 5–23. doi:10.3406/iliri.2009.1078.
- Ceka, Neritan (2011). "Cezari në Akrokeraune- vende dhe gjurmë / Cesare in acroceraunia-luoghi e tracce". Iliria. 35: 99–122. doi:10.3406/iliri.2011.1101.
- Ceka, Neritan; Ceka, Olgita (2017). "A Peripolarchos inscription from the castle of Matohasanaj". In Luan Përzhita; Ilir Gjipali; Gëzim Hoxha; Belisa Muka (eds.). New archaeological discoveries in the Albanian regions: proceedings of the international conference 30 - 31 January, Tirana 2017. Vol. 1. Botimet Albanologjike. Academy for Albanian Studies, Institute of Archaeology. pp. 488–508. ISBN 978-9928-141-71-2.
- Ceka, Olgita (2012). "Il koinon e la città. L'esempio di Byllis". In G. de Marinis; G.M. FabriniG. Paci; R. Perna; M. Silvestrini (eds.). I processi formativi ed evolutividella città in area adriatica. BAR International Series. Vol. 2419. Archaeopress. pp. 59–64. ISBN 978-1-4073-1018-3.
- Çipa, Kriledjan (2020). "The fortified settlement of Borshi and its role in Chaonia fortification system". In Luigi Maria Caliò; Gian Michele Gerogiannis; Maria Kopsacheili (eds.). Fortificazioni e società nel Mediterraneo occidentale: Albania e Grecia settentrionale [Fortifications and Societies in the Western Mediterranean: Albania and Northern Greece]. Quasar. ISBN 9788854910430.
- de Matteis, Mario (2017). "Stazioni di sosta (mutationes) lungo la via Egnazia". Palaver. 6 (2): 7–28. doi:10.1285/i22804250v6i2p7. ISSN 2280-4250.
- Doka, Dhimitёr; Qiriazi, Perikli (2022). The Geography of Albania: Problems and Perspectives. World Regional Geography Book Series. Springer Nature. ISBN 9783030855512.
- Fasolo, Michele (2009). "La via Egnatia nel territorio della Repubblica di Macedonia". In Cesare Marangio; Giovanni Laudizi (eds.). Παλαιά Φιλία [Palaià Philía]: studi di topografia antica in onore di Giovanni Uggeri. Journal of Ancient Topography - Rivista di Topografia Antica (in Italian). Vol. 4. Mario Congedo editore. pp. 601–612. ISBN 9788880868651.
- Jaupaj, Lavdosh (2019). Etudes des interactions culturelles en aire Illyro-épirote du VII au III siècle av. J.-C (Thesis). Université de Lyon; Instituti i Arkeologjisë (Albanie).
- Larson, Jennifer Lynn (2001). Greek Nymphs: Myth, Cult, Lore. New York: Oxford University Press. ISBN 978-0-19-514465-9.
- Lemke, Martin; Shpuza, Saimir; Wojciechowski, Bartosz (2021). "Bushat, not lost but found: a ' new ' Illyrian settlement in northern Albania". Antiquity. 95 (380): 1–9. doi:10.15184/aqy.2021.11. S2CID 232432547.
- Lepper, F. A. (1988). Trajan's Column: A New Edition of the Cichorius Plates. Alan Sutton. ISBN 9780862994679.
- Mesihović, Salmedin; Šačić, Amra (2015). Historija Ilira [History of Illyrians] (in Bosnian). Sarajevo: Univerzitet u Sarajevu [University of Sarajevo]. ISBN 978-9958-600-65-4.
- Miletić, Alen (2008). "Castellum Tariona" [The Castellum Tariona]. Vjesnik Za Arheologiju I Povijest Dalmatinsku (in Croatian and English). 101 (1). Split: 59–74.
- Miraj, Lida (2002). "The Earliest Coinage of Epidamnos/Dyrrachion as a Source". In Cambi, Nenad; Čače, Slobodan; Kirigin, Branko (eds.). Greek influence along the East Adriatic Coast. Knjiga Mediterana. Vol. 26. pp. 435–470. ISBN 9531631549.
- Morton, Jacob Nathan (2017). "Shifting Landscapes, Policies, And Morals: A Topographically Driven Analysis Of The Roman Wars In Greece From 200 Bc To 168 Bc". Publicly Accessible Penn Dissertations. 2484. University of Pennsylvania. Archived from the original on September 17, 2019.
- Muka, Belisa; Heinzelmann, Michael (2014). "Dimal: new results of the Albanian-German research project". In Molla, Nevilla (ed.). Proceedings of the International Congress of Albanian Archaeological Studies: 65th Anniversary of Albanian Archaeology (21-22 November, Tirana 2013). Tiranë: Botimet Albanologjike. pp. 223–231. ISBN 9789928141286.
- Papadopoulos, John (2016). "Komai, Colonies and Cities in Epirus and Southern Albania: The Failure of the Polis and the Rise of Urbanism on the Fringes of the Greek World". In Molloy, Barry P.C. (ed.). Of Odysseys and Oddities: Scales and Modes of Interaction Between Prehistoric Aegean Societies and their Neighbours. Oxbow Books. pp. 435–460. ISBN 978-1-78570-232-7.
- Šašel Kos, Marjeta (2005). Appian and Illyricum. Narodni Muzej Slovenije. ISBN 978-961-6169-36-3.
- Šašel Kos, M.; Kos, P. (2017). "Places: 197225 (Corinium)". Pleiades.
- Šašel Kos, M.; Kos, P. (2019). "Places: 197280 (Fulfinium/Fertinium)". Pleiades.
- Šašel Kos, M.; Kos, P. (2020). "Places: 197115 (Andetrium)". Pleiades.
- Schermer, Shirley; Shukriu, Edi; Deskaj, Sylvia (2011). Marquez-Grant, Nicholas; Fibiger, Linda (eds.). The Routledge Handbook of Archaeological Human Remains and Legislation: An International Guide to Laws and Practice in the Excavation and Treatment of Archaeological Human Remains. Taylor & Francis. ISBN 978-1136879562.
- Shpuza, Saimir (2014). Dyczek, Piotr (ed.). "Iron Age Fortifications and the Origin of the City in the Territory of Scodra". Novensia. 25. Warszawa: Ośrodek Badań nad Antykiem Europy Południowo-Wschodniej: 105–126. ISBN 978-83-934239-96. ISSN 0860-5777.
- Shpuza, Saimir (2017). Dyczek, Piotr (ed.). "Scodra and the Labeates. Cities, rural fortifications and territorial defense in the Hellenistic period". Novensia. 28. Warszawa: Ośrodek Badań nad Antykiem Europy Południowo-Wschodniej: 41–64. ISBN 978-83-946222-5-1. ISSN 0860-5777.
- Shpuza, Saimir; Dyczek, Piotr (2019). "Qyteti ilir në Bushat. Fortifikimi, kronologjia dhe probleme të identifikimit të tij" [The Illyrian city at Bushat. Fortifications, Chronology and Problems of identification]. Iliria. XLII.
- Shpuza, Saimir (2022). "D'un limên à une polis. Orikos aux périodes archaïque et classique". In Brancato, Rodolfo (ed.). Schemata: la città oltre la forma : per una nuova definizione dei paesaggi urbani e delle loro funzioni: urbanizzazione e società nel Mediterraneo pre-classico: età arcaica. Edizioni Quasar. ISBN 9788854912755.
- Tafilica, Zamir; Baze, Ermal; Lafe, Ols (2023). "Historical Background". In Galaty, Michael L.; Bejko, Lorenc (eds.). Archaeological Investigations in a Northern Albanian Province: Results of the Projekti Arkeologjik i Shkodrës (PASH): Volume One: Survey and Excavation Results. Memoirs Series. Vol. 64. University of Michigan Press. ISBN 9781951538736.
- Theodossiev, Nikola (1998). "The dead with golden faces: Dasaretian, Pelagonian, Mygdonian and Boeotian funeral masks". Oxford Journal of Archaeology. 17 (3). Blackwell Publishing: 345–367. doi:10.1111/1468-0092.00067.
- Ujes, Dubravka (2002). "Recherche sur la localisation de Damastion et ses mines". Revue numismatique. 6th. 6 (158): 103–129. doi:10.3406/numi.2002.1438.
- Volpe, Giuliano; Disantarosa, Giacomo; Leone, Danilo; Turchiano, Maria (2014). "Porti, approdi e itinerari dell'Albania meridionale dall'Antichità al Medioevo. Il 'Progetto Liburna'". Ricerche Archeologiche in Albania. Aracne: 287–326. doi:10.4399/978885487245516 (inactive 1 July 2025). hdl:11586/257570. ISBN 978-88-548-7245-5.
- Wilkes, John (1992). The Illyrians. Wiley. ISBN 9780631146711.
- Wilkes, J. J. (2000). "Map 49 Illyricum. Compiled by J.J. Wilkes, 1995". In Talbert, Richard J. A. (ed.). Barrington Atlas of the Greek and Roman World: Map-by-map Directory. Vol. 1. Princeton University Press. pp. 749–760. ISBN 0691049459.
- Wilkes, J. J. (1996). "The Danubian and Balkan provinces". In Alan K. Bowman; Edward Champlin; Andrew Linto (eds.). The Cambridge Ancient History: The Augustan Empire, 43 B.C—A.D. 69. Vol. 10. Cambridge University Press. pp. 545–585. ISBN 0521264308.
- Wilkes, J. J.; Fischer-Hansen, Tobias (2004). "The Adriatic". In Mogens Herman Hansen; Thomas Heine Nielsen (eds.). An Inventory of Archaic and Classical Poleis. Oxford University Press. pp. 321–337. ISBN 0-19-814099-1.
- Wilkes, John J. J. (2012). "Places: 481942 (Palaeste)". Pleiades.
- Winnifrith, Tom J. (2002). Badlands-borderlands: a history of Northern Epirus/Southern Albania. London: Duckworth. ISBN 0-7156-3201-9.
- Zindel, Christian; Lippert, Andreas; Lahi, Bashkim; Kiel, Machiel (2018). Albanien: Ein Archäologie- und Kunstführer von der Steinzeit bis ins 19. Jahrhundert (in German). Vandenhoeck & Ruprecht. ISBN 9783205200109.
