= Sutina =

Sutina may refer to:

- Sutina, Bosnia and Herzegovina, a village near Posušje
- Sutina, Croatia, a village near Muć
- Sutina (significant landscape), a stream and a protected area near Sinj and Lučane, Croatia
