= Rosujë =

Archaeological site in Albania

Coordinates: 42°21′00″N 20°3′36″E

Rosujë is an archaeological site in northern Albania.

== Description ==
The site occupies a strategically elevated position above the Valbona Valley, approximately 6 km southwest of Bajram Curri, within the village of Bunjaj. It is found along the historic Tropojë–Shkodër route, with an additional connection leading northward toward the Kosovo plain. The position roughly agrees with Ptolemy's co-ordinates of Thermidava in relation to Scodra and Rhision.

Excavations conducted in the 1964–1965 period demonstrated continuous or recurring use of the southeastern hill slope from the Early Iron Age through the 4th–5th centuries AD. The earliest evidence consists of simple fortification elements and coarse pottery. A subsequent phase, dated to the 4th–2nd centuries BC, is represented by a 20 m section of dry-stone fortification wall constructed from worked limestone, 1.5–2.5 m thick and built with a double shell filled with small stones.

The best-preserved architectural remains belong to Late Antiquity. These include stone-slab fortifications set in clay mortar preserved in the areas known as “Gjyteti i vogël” and “Gjyteti i madh.” At the summit of the latter, the remains of a watchtower survive to a height of 3.1 m; its original height is estimated at 5–6 m, allowing surveillance of the surrounding region up to the Luzhë Pass.

Additional traces of 3 wooden structures from the 4th–2nd centuries BC have been identified, while the late antique constructions are entirely of stone. Most ceramic finds are of local manufacture, although coins from Shkodër, Dyrrhachium (Durrës), and Apollonia, together with Rhodian amphorae, indicate commercial links with southern Illyrian urban centers and the Greek world.

Overall, the site appears to represent a small settlement that may have served as a focal point for local elite groups, which later in Late Antiquity apparently served as a strategically positioned observation post.

== See also ==
- List of settlements in Illyria
