= Lučane, Croatia =

Settlement in Split-Dalmatia County, Croatia

Lučane
- Settlement
- Interactive map of Lučane
- Location of Lučane in Croatia
- Coordinates: 43°43′08″N 16°35′38″E
- Country: Croatia
- County: Split-Dalmatia
- City: Sinj

Area
  - Total: 17.8 km^{2} (6.9 sq mi)

Population (2021)
  - Total: 601
  - Density: 33.8/km^{2} (87.4/sq mi)
- Time zone: UTC+1 (CET)
  - Summer (DST): UTC+2 (CEST)
- Postal code: 21230 Sinj
- Area code: +385 (0)21

Lučane is a settlement in the City of Sinj in Croatia. In 2021, its population was 601.

The village is situated within a fertile valley. Archaeological discoveries point to human occupation extending back to prehistoric times, as a suspect community of huts was located near the stream of Sutina. The ancient site of Setovia, referenced in accounts of Octavian's military campaign against the Dalmatae, is believed to have been on the nearby hill of Sušanj. Experts further postulate that the principal ancient roadway connecting Andetrium (near Muć) and Aequum (near Čitluk) traversed the Lučane area. Findings in the region also include several burial sites dating to late antiquity, specifically between the 3rd and 6th centuries.

== Demographics ==
Lučane: Population trends 1857–2021
v

population	346	433	460	525	555	705	721	718	708	760	804	769	768	720	687	649	601
	1857	1869	1880	1890	1900	1910	1921	1931	1948	1953	1961	1971	1981	1991	2001	2011	2021

Sources: Croatian Bureau of Statistics publications

== Notable people ==
- Bože V. Žigo, journalist and writer
