= Lučane =

Lučane may refer to:

- Lučane, Serbia, a village near Bujanovac
- Lučane, Croatia, a village near Sinj
- Lučane, Austria, the Slovene name of Leutschach, a village near Leibnitz
- Lučané, a Bohemian Slavic tribe, cf. list of early Slavic peoples
