= Salvia, Liburnia =

Ancient Illyrian settlement

Salvia was an Illyrian settlement in the region of Liburnia of the Illyrian tribe of Delmatae. The exact location is unknown, it is mentioned together with Stridon, possibly at Bosansko Grahovo.

== See also ==
- List of settlements in Illyria
