= Zelovo =

Zelovo can refer to the following places:

- Zelovo, Sinj, a village in Croatia
- Zelovo, Muć, a village in Croatia

== Notes ==
1. Known as Zelovo Sutinsko until 1991.
