= Arduba =

Roman settlement

Arduba (Ancient Greek: Ἄρδουβα, Latin: Arduba) was a settlement of the Illyrian tribe of the Daesitiates in Illyria. Following the Roman invasion, the settlement was included in the Roman province of Dalmatia. Arduba was located somewhere near the modern city of Zenica in Bosnia and Herzegovina. Most probably the royal city of Vranduk existed in the time of the Illyrians, under the name Arduba.

== History ==
The Bellum Batonianum (Latin: War of the Batos) was a military conflict fought in the Roman province of Illyricum in the 1st century AD, in which an alliance of native peoples of the two regions of Illyricum, Dalmatia and Pannonia, revolted against the Romans. The last major location of the conflict between the Illyrian and the Romans was Arduba.

In the summer of the 9th year AC there was the numerous and powerful army of the Roman Empire, led by the general Germanicus, standing in front of this city.

One of the reasons the encounter was remembered lies in the description of the heroism of Arduban women, as reported by Dio. Allegedly, they refused to surrender and preferred death over captivity. While there are similar stories throughout ancient history, this is one of the few instances where the heroism is reported by a historian of the opposing forces. The city’s men surrendered, but the women refused. An internal conflict erupted fostered by women who did not want to fall in captivity by the Romans. Carrying their children in their arms, they threw themselves into fire or jumped in the river to drown.

Germanicus turned his attention to the last holdouts in Arduba, which was a fortified town with a river around its base. Within the town there was tension between rebel deserters who wanted to carry on the fight and the inhabitants who wanted peace. The tension eventually developed into violence. The women reportedly helped the deserters because, contrary to their men, they did not want to suffer servitude. The deserters were defeated and surrendered. The women took their children and threw themselves into the flames or the river. Cassius Dio did not specify what caused the fire. The nearby towns surrendered voluntarily. Germanicus re-joined Tiberius, and sent Gaius Vibius Postumus to subdue the other districts. Bato promised to surrender if he and his followers would be pardoned. Tiberius agreed and then asked him why his people had rebelled. According to Cassius Dio, he replied: "You Romans are to blame for this; for you send as guardians of your flocks, not dogs or shepherds, but wolves."

In some ways Arduba then became a major designation for the Great Illyrian Rebellion, but also a symbol of the tragic history that its people have been experiencing from generation to generation for over two millennia.

Two centuries later, the historic role of Arduba was immortalised by the Roman historian and official Cassius Dio with his description of the battle of Arduba. To date, with the exception of the writings of Cassius Dio, no other original testimony (either literary, epigraphic or archaeological) exists about the town called Arduba.

== Research ==
Wilhelm Tomaschek (1880) located Arduba in Vranduk near Zenica. But archaeological excavations (1968) provided neither prehistoric nor ancient findings to confirm this.

The urban part of today's Zenica already formed in the Stone Age Neolithic, and especially later in the time of the Illyrians. Today, toponyms of their gradinas (fortified towns) are evidence for this: Gradišće, Gračanica, Gradac. This is how we assume that the Royal city of Vranduk probably existed in the time of the Illyrians, under the name Arduba.

The philologist Erich Koestermann locates Arduba east of the river Neretva, beyond the eastern limit on ethnic Dalmatia.

John Wilkes appears to associate Arduba fall with military operations of Germanicus and Gaius Vibius Postumus against the Desidiates and Perustae.

The primary sources of information about the city Arduba are the writings of Cassius Dio and Velleius Paterculus.

Arduba must have been a major insurgent stronghold and settlement in the area, as refugees from other parts of the region and strongholds merged with it. Although he had a much larger army than the people who defended Arduba, Germanicus faced strong defence fortifications in front of the settlement, which made it not easy to simply invade Arduba. In addition to being heavily fortified, Arduba was located near a fast-flowing river. This clearly indicates that Arduba must have been located somewhere in the mountainous area of a larger river, meaning its upper or middle stream. The exploration of Arduba’s location should take into account the following points which can be inferred from data from the relevant Cassius Dio text and its interpretation:

1. Arduba was not an isolated place, but rather in a crowded location. There were more important indigenous roads and it was positioned in the direction of the main appearance of Germanic’s troops.
2. The existence of a river in its immediate vicinity, with relative depth.
3. That it was not a border point, but it was the centre of an area -this is suggested from the meaning of Cassius Dio text in particular. This seems to indicate that there were places, positions and settlements that gravitated to Arduba.

== See also ==
- List of settlements in Illyria
