= Ramljane, Split-Dalmatia County =

Settlement in Split-Dalmatia County, Croatia

Ramljane
- Settlement
- Interactive map of Ramljane
- Location of Ramljane in Croatia
- Coordinates: 43°43′52″N 16°21′36″E
- Country: Croatia
- County: Split-Dalmatia
- Municipality: Muć

Area
  - Total: 16.3 km^{2} (6.3 sq mi)

Population (2021)
  - Total: 130
  - Density: 8.0/km^{2} (21/sq mi)
- Time zone: UTC+1 (CET)
  - Summer (DST): UTC+2 (CEST)
- Postal code: 21203 Donji Muć
- Area code: +385 (0)21

Ramljane is a settlement in the Municipality of Muć in Croatia. In 2021, its population was 130.

== Demographics ==
Ramljane: Population trends 1857–2021
v

population	452	461	483	454	533	548	548	554	630	621	539	508	324	274	223	167	130
	1857	1869	1880	1890	1900	1910	1921	1931	1948	1953	1961	1971	1981	1991	2001	2011	2021

Sources: Croatian Bureau of Statistics publications
