= Mala Milešina =

Settlement in Split-Dalmatia County, Croatia

- Settlement
- Interactive map of Mala Milešina
- Location of Mala Milešina in Croatia
- Coordinates: 43°45′23″N 16°26′39″E
- Country: Croatia
- County: Split-Dalmatia
- Municipality: Muć

Area
  - Total: 2.5 km^{2} (0.97 sq mi)

Population (2021)
  - Total: 12
  - Density: 4.8/km^{2} (12/sq mi)
- Time zone: UTC+1 (CET)
  - Summer (DST): UTC+2 (CEST)
- Postal code: 21203 Donji Muć
- Area code: +385 (0)21

Mala Milešina is a settlement in the Municipality of Muć in Croatia. In 2021, its population was 12.

== Demographics ==
Mala Milešina: Population trends 1857–2021
v

population						153	153	180	152	130	112	86	64	19	26	21	12
	1857	1869	1880	1890	1900	1910	1921	1931	1948	1953	1961	1971	1981	1991	2001	2011	2021

Sources: Croatian Bureau of Statistics publications
