= Liburnia =

Ancient region in modern Croatia

Ethnolinguistic map of Italy in the Iron Age, before the Roman expansion and conquest of Italy

Liburnia (Ancient Greek: Λιβουρνία) in ancient geography was the land of the Liburnians, a region along the northeastern Adriatic coast in Europe, in modern Croatia, whose borders shifted according to the extent of the Liburnian dominance at a given time between 11th and 1st century BC. The heartland of ancient Liburnia is commonly assumed to have been roughly coterminous with modern Kvarner Gulf region of Croatia, along the northeastern Adriatic coast.

Domination of the Liburnian thalassocracy in the Adriatic Sea was confirmed by several Antique writers, but the archeologists have defined a region of their material culture to be more precisely in northern Dalmatia, eastern Istria, and Kvarner.

== Classical Liburnia ==
The Liburnian cultural group developed at the end of the Bronze Age after the Balkan-Pannonian migrations, and during the Iron Age in a region bordered by Raša, Zrmanja and Krka rivers (Arsia, Tedanius, Titius), including the nearby islands. This territory lay mostly at the coast and on the numerous islands. Its continental borders were marked by the rivers and mountains: Raša, Učka, Gorski Kotar, peaks of Velebit mountain (Mons Baebius), Zrmanja and Krka, with a small area northeast of Krka bordered by Butišnica, Krka, Kosovčica and Čikola, around the city Promona (modern Tepljuh near Drniš). Thus, it neighbored in the northwest with the Histri, in the north with the Iapodian and in the southeast with the Dalmatian cultural groups.

Liburnian culture had distinct features and differed considerably from those of its neighbors. Its isolation and special qualities resulted primarily from its geographical isolation from the hinterland and its seaward orientation, which was important for traffic circulation and territorial connection. Maritime focus shaped Liburnian ethnic development on the Indo-European basis with the transfer of Mediterranean cultural traditions into an independent ethnic community, separated from neighboring peoples, but having evident similarities and links with the wider Illyrian and Adriatic territories. The Liburnians' skillful seamanship allowed them to hold navigable routes along the eastern Adriatic coast with strategic points, such as the islands of Hvar and Lastovo in the central Adriatic and Corfu (8th century BC) in the Ionian Sea, while they already had colonies at the western Adriatic coast, especially in region of Picenum from the beginning of the Iron Age. From the 9th to the 6th century there was certain koine - cultural unity in the Adriatic, with the general Liburninan seal, whose naval supremacy meant both political and economical authority in the Adriatic Sea through several centuries.

Liburnian territory in cca 5th century BC

According to Strabo (VI, 269), the Liburnians were masters of the island Korkyra (Corfu), until 735 BC, when they left it, under pressure of Corinthian ruler Hersikrates, in a period of Corinthian expansion to South Italy, Sicily and Ionian Sea. However their position in the Adriatic Sea was still strong in the next few centuries. Historian Theopompus (377-320 BC) informed about the island groups in the Adriatic Sea: Apsartides (Cres and Lošinj), Elektrides (Krk), while all the others were the Liburnian islands - Liburnides, from Zadar archipelago to Ladesta (Lastovo) in the south, including Paros (Hvar). Geographer Scymnus (2nd century BC) noted that Greek island of Paros had a namesake in the Adriatic Sea, Liburnian island of Paros (Hvar); this name was later changed to Pharos, according to Strabo (VII, 5). Scymnus specially noted the island group Mentorides (Arba - Rab and Cissa - (Pag). Old Greek sources never noted any Liburnian settlement in the northern coasts, possibly because the ancient mariners had been using only outer island channels for navigation towards the beginning of the Amber Road in the north of Adriatic, evading inner seas which were ruled by Liburnian thallasocracy. Alexandria's librarian Apollonius of Rhodes (295 – 215 BC) yet described the islands, Issa (Vis), Diskelados (Brač) and Pitiea (Hvar) as Liburnian. But by the 1st century AD Pliny the Elder includes in the island group Liburnicae only the archipelagos in Zadar and Šibenik aquatories, Gissa (Pag), Sissa (Sestrunj), Scardagissa (Škarda), Lissa (Ugljan and Pašman), Colentum (Murter), island groups Celadussae (Dugi Otok), Crateae, and several other minor ones, though their municipalities occupied islands to the north, Curycta (Krk), Arba (Rab), Crepsa (Cres), Apsorus (Lošinj).

Archaeology has confirmed that the narrow region of the Liburnian ethnic nucleus was at the eastern Adriatic coast between Krka and Raša rivers, in "Classical Liburnia", especially between Krka and Zrmanja rivers, where the material remains of their culture and settlements were the most frequently distributed, while their cities were urbanized at certain degree even in pre-Roman ages. By the material remains it's obvious that they didn't settle the eastern Adriatic coast to the south-east of Krka river; their supremacy on the islands to the south of their ethnic region should not be understood necessarily as their ethnic dominion in the southern Adriatic archipelagos (Hvar, Brač, Vis, Lastovo, etc.), but rather as their organized military-naval region based on the island outposts, by which they maintained control of the navigable route to the south.

In the 6th century BC their domination of the Adriatic Sea coasts started to diminish. They lost their trade colonies in the Western Adriatic coast due to invasion of the Umbri and the Gauls, caused by expansion of the Etruscan union in the basin of Po river. The 5th century BC saw Greek colonization in the south Adriatic, and final Liburnian retreat to Liburnia was caused by military and political activities of Dionysius the Elder of Syracuse in the 4th century BC. Liburnia was strongly held, but Greek colonization reached Liburnian strategic possessions in the central Adriatic, Issa (on the island of Vis) and Pharos (Starigrad, Hvar), a colony of the Greeks from Paros. Celtic invasion from the west bypassed Liburnia in the 4th century BC, but their northern neighbors the Iapodes were under considerably more pressure. The Liburnians took the opportunity to spread their territory to the Kvarner archipelago and the eastern coast of Istria to the river Raša, previously held by Iapodes, thus making the Histri their new neighbors to the west. On the basis of ancient records, the Iapodes inhabited the coast between Albona (Labin) and Lopsica (Sv. Juraj, south from Senj) and island Curycta (Krk) to the end of the 4th century BC. Material remains from the Early Iron Age in that region have alternately shown Histrian provenance, not necessarily Liburnian, but often ascribed to the Liburnians from the 4th century BC to the age of Roman conquest. Although archaeology of the region has not strictly confirmed the earlier presence of Iapodian material culture the group's presence and strong influence on the region is evident. They surely broke to Kvarner in the 20s of the 3rd century BC and the border between Iapodia and Liburnia was the river Telavius (Žrnovnica, Velebit Channel). It’s not certain how long they ruled these coasts (some propose until the 1st century BC) and when exactly they retreated to their main historical lands. Borders of Liburnia didn’t change until its conflict with Dalmatae in 51 BC, when the Liburnians lost their city Promona (Tepljuh, Drniš) in the south and probably some lands around Krka river. By that time the Romans were already engaged in centuries long wars against Liburnian neighbors, Histri, Dalmatae and other Illyrians. According to DNA research, the Liburnians possess the J haplogroup (J2b2a1-L283 also known as J-PH160) which probably came from the area of Crete or the area of Asia Minor.

== Roman Liburnia ==
When Roman force ended the independence of their naval force in 33 BC, the Liburnians lost their freedom and Liburnia became a part of the Roman province of Dalmatia, but marginal in a military sense. Burnum on the Krka river became a Roman military camp, while the frequently settled and already urbanized plains of Classical Liburnia, in the inland of Iader (Zadar), became easily accessible and controlled by the Roman rulers. However Liburnian seamanship tradition was never wiped out, but became primarily trade-oriented under the new circumstances, a shift which contributed to the economic and cultural flourishing of its ports and cities, as well as to those of the province in general. Despite the process of Romanization that especially affected some of the bigger cities, the Liburnians saved their traditions, cults, typical funeral monuments (Liburnian cippus), names etc., as attested by the archaeological material from those ages.

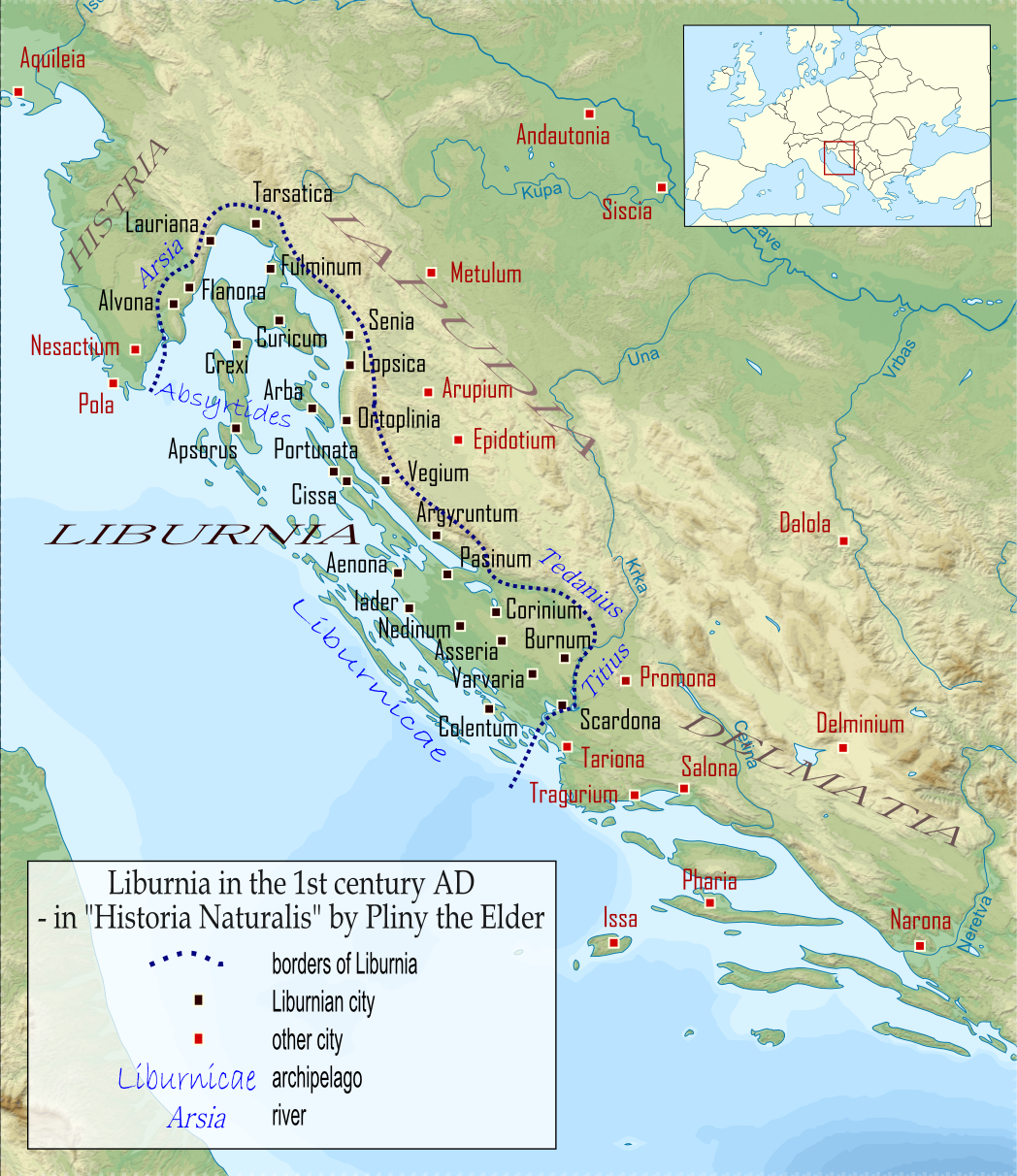
Liburnia in the age of the Roman conquest

After the Roman conquest, the delineation of Liburnia as a region became more settled. Pliny the Elder (1st century AD) gave a detailed geography of Liburnia, noting their tetradekapolis political-regional organization, 14 Liburnian municipalities subject to Scardona (Skradin). Worth mention were Lacinienses (unknown), Stulpinos (unknown Stulpi), Burnistas (Burnum), Olbonenses (unknown), those who enjoyed Italic law (Ius Italicum) were Alutae (Alvona - Labin), Flanates (Flanona – Plomin, the gulf of Kvarner was named by them - sinus Flanaticus), Lopsi (around the strategic pass of Vratnik and the town of Lopsica – Sv. Juraj, south from Senj), Varvarini (Varvaria – Bribir), tribute immunity was given to Asseriates (Asseria – Podgrađe near Benkovac) and to the islanders Fertinates (*Fulfinates, Fulfin(i)um - Omišalj on Krk) and Curictae (Curicum, Krk).

He listed the cities along the coast from north to the south: Alvona (Labin), Flanona (Plomin), Tarsatica (Rijeka), Senia (Senj), Lopsica (Sv. Juraj, south from Senj), Ortoplinia (probably Stinica, in Velebit), Vegium (Karlobag), Argyruntum (Starigrad), Corinium (Karin Donji), Aenona (Nin), civitas Pasini (in Ražanac – Vinjerac – Posedarje range), important island cities Absortium (Apsorus – Osor), Arba (Rab), Crexi (Cres), Gissa (Cissa, Caska near Novalja, Pag), Portunata (Novalja, older was Gissa portu nota – Cissa known by its port Novalja), by the coast colonia Iader (Zadar with status of Roman colony), Colentum insula (Murter, city and island).

Liburnia was a part of the Roman Empire until its collapse in 476 AD. During the reign of Augustus, the border between the Liburnians and Histri was Arsia river in Istria. In 170 AD a part of north-western Liburnian periphery that included the city Tarsatica (Trsat) was cut off from Liburnia. The new border was by Vinodol’s synclinal not northern from modern Crikvenica. From the middle of the 2nd century AD, the name "Liburnia" was used not only for the territory settled by the Liburnians, but also for previously "Iapodian" territory in official usage; the Iapodians were included with the Liburnians to the court jurisdiction county of Scardona (Skradin), one of the convent seats in the provinces of Dalmatia. By the end of 330s AD, Liburnia was administratively attached to Dalmatia. However, it was still treated and recognized as a special and different area.

== Medieval Liburnia ==
After the fall of the Roman Empire and probably already from 490 AD, Liburnia within Dalmatia passed to the rule of the Ostrogoths, which lasted for six decades. The region of Savia was administratively added to the Gothic province of Dalmatia; the capital city of the both provinces was Salona (Solin), a seat of the ruler "comes Dalmatiarum et Saviae".

The Goths lost most of Dalmatia and part of Liburnia in the south-east around Skradin in 536 AD during the war started by Byzantine emperor Justinian the Great to reconquer the territories of the former Western Empire (see Gothic War), while part of Liburnia in Ravni Kotari with Zadar surrendered to the Byzantines in 552 AD. However, northern Liburnia and the rest of Classical Liburnia remained in Gothic hands until 555 AD; after Byzantine conquest of Savia (540 AD) and Istria (543 AD) it was organized to special administrative-territorial unit of the Gothic state, known as "Liburnia Tarsatica", military province directly subject to comes Gotharum settled in Aquilea. This "military-naval" region, protected by heavy fleet, became a barrier to the Byzantine army step to Lika and Gorski Kotar, keeping safe continental road route over Tarsatica to Aquileia and northern Italy. According to anonymous Cosmographer of Ravenna (6th or 7th century), Liburnia Tarsatica considered all coastal cities from Albona (Labin) to Elona (Aenona, Nin) of Classical Liburnia and Iapodian settlements in the inland (Lika).

From 550 and 551 AD, the Slavs (Sclabenoi) started to break into Illyria and Dalmatia, as recorded by Procopius; by some thinking it was beginning of Slavic colonization there, which lasted during the next few centuries. Initial ethnic nucleus under Croatian name originated in Liburnian inland from where it soon spread to all Liburnia and from there to the other regions of former Illyricum province. In the pre-Roman ages, the Liburnians had been organized in 14 municipalities (tetradekapolis); the Croats probably used the existing Illyrian municipality structure and had 14 županijas, Old Croatian political-jurisdictional forms (municipalities), as reported by Constantine Porphyrogenitus, while many of the twelve Old Croatian tribes were settled in Liburnia. In the next centuries Croatian language overlaid Dalmatian language spoken in Liburnia and Dalmatia and already by the end of the 9th century, in the islands of Zadar aquatory, more than 70% of toponyms were Slavic forms.

From the 6th to the 9th century, the names Liburnia and Dalmatia were continually used for separate specifics in the sources, which not necessarily meant that Liburnia was a separate political unit, but the name was certainly used to denote the territorial range of classical Liburnia. At the end of the 8th century Charlemagne conquered Pannonia, then most of Istria, Liburnia and Dalmatia, but the main coastal cities of Liburnia and Dalmatia remained under Byzantine control, organized into the Dalmatian archonty with Jadera (Zadar) as a provincial metropolis. Most of Liburnia was under direct Frankish rule and separated from the Croatian Principality of Dalmatia until 820 AD. By some suppositions, Croatian prince Borna was a Frankish vassal sent from Liburnia to Dalmatia to organize it into a vassal state to the Frankish Empire; in 820 AD, Louis the Pious rewarded him for his merits and devotion, by adding Liburnia to his jurisdiction. Borna enjoyed the title of dux Dalmatiae atque Liburniae. After Borna, Croatian rulers replaced "Liburnia" with "Croatia" in their titles and after the reign of Držislav (969-997) they were kings of "Dalmatia and Croatia"; thus geographical name Liburnia disappeared from official use and was only used for a historical land.

== Later usage of the name Liburnia ==
In later phases of the Middle Ages, the name Liburnia was used periodically to refer to the eastern coast of Istria and northern Dalmatia around the plain of Zadar. In recent times this name has been replaced by the Italian Quarnero and the Croatian Kvarner, names which refer to the northern Adriatic islands and the adjacent coast of Istria and Dalmatia. Currently, the name Liburnia persists only in poetic usage and to indicate hotels and ships in the Adriatic.

== See also ==
- Adriatic Sea
- Ancient Rome
- Croatia
- Dalmatia
- Illyrians
- Liburnian language
- Liburnians
