= Radunić =

Settlement in Split-Dalmatia County, Croatia

- Settlement
- Interactive map of Radunić
- Location of Radunić in Croatia
- Coordinates: 43°43′59″N 16°25′59″E
- Country: Croatia
- County: Split-Dalmatia
- Municipality: Muć

Area
  - Total: 6.6 km^{2} (2.5 sq mi)

Population (2021)
  - Total: 73
  - Density: 11/km^{2} (29/sq mi)
- Time zone: UTC+1 (CET)
  - Summer (DST): UTC+2 (CEST)
- Postal code: 21203 Donji Muć
- Area code: +385 (0)21

Radunić is a settlement in the Municipality of Muć in Croatia. In 2021, its population was 73.

== Demographics ==
Radunić: Population trends 1857–2021
v

population			174	193	215	238	238	280	256	248	237	212	160	112	85	86	73
	1857	1869	1880	1890	1900	1910	1921	1931	1948	1953	1961	1971	1981	1991	2001	2011	2021

Sources: Croatian Bureau of Statistics publications
