= Saloniana =

Ancient settlement in Illyria

Saloniana was an Illyrian settlement of the Delmatae.

The possible location is modern-day Imotski.

== See also ==
- List of ancient cities in Illyria
