= Antenal =

Antenal Antenale, Bučarjevo
- Village
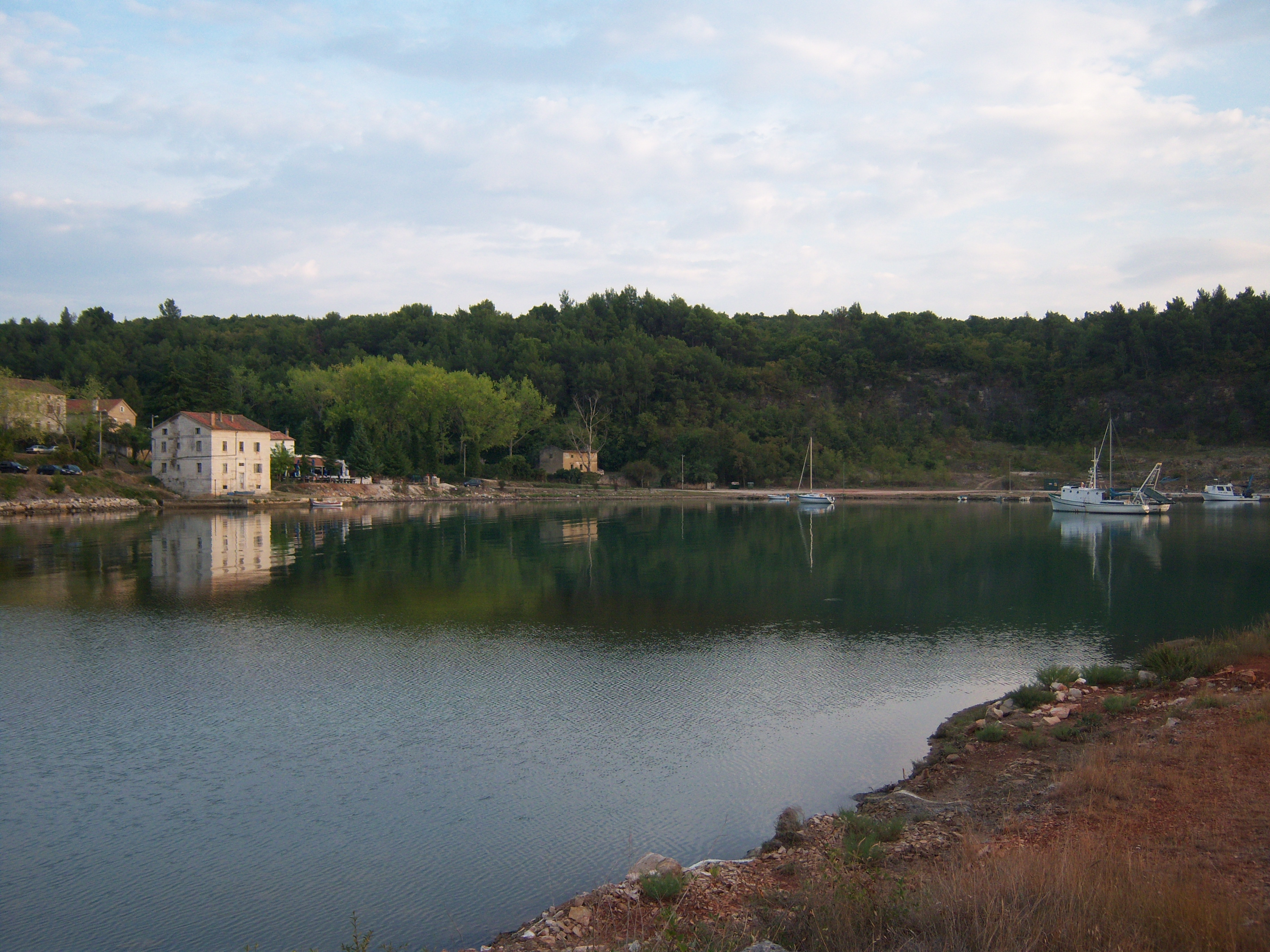

- Location within Croatia
- Coordinates: 45.3278176°N 13.5964367°E
- Country: Croatia
- County: Istria County
- Municipality: Novigrad

Area
  - Total: 2.4 sq mi (6.2 km^{2})

Population (2021)
  - Total: 129
  - Density: 54/sq mi (21/km^{2})
- Time zone: UTC+1 (CET)
  - Summer (DST): UTC+2 (CEST)
- Postal code: 52466 Novigrad
- Area code: 052

Antenal (Italian: Antenale) is a village in the municipality of Novigrad-Cittanova, Istria in Croatia. It is located on the Adriatic coast, at the mouth of the Mirna river.

== Demographics ==
According to the 2021 census, its population was 129.
