= Gornje Ogorje =

Settlement in Split-Dalmatia County, Croatia

- Settlement
- Interactive map of Gornje Ogorje
- Location of Gornje Ogorje in Croatia
- Coordinates: 43°44′19″N 16°28′11″E
- Country: Croatia
- County: Split-Dalmatia
- Municipality: Muć

Area
  - Total: 25.7 km^{2} (9.9 sq mi)

Population (2021)
  - Total: 123
  - Density: 4.79/km^{2} (12.4/sq mi)
- Time zone: UTC+1 (CET)
  - Summer (DST): UTC+2 (CEST)
- Postal code: 21203 Donji Muć
- Area code: +385 (0)21

Gornje Ogorje is a settlement in the Municipality of Muć in Croatia. In 2021, its population was 123.

== Demographics ==
Gornje Ogorje: Population trends 1857–2021
v

population	579	516	512	605	718	775	775	890	869	833	772	603	420	251	218	163	123
	1857	1869	1880	1890	1900	1910	1921	1931	1948	1953	1961	1971	1981	1991	2001	2011	2021

Sources: Croatian Bureau of Statistics publications
