= Crivac =

Settlement in Split-Dalmatia County, Croatia

- Settlement
- Interactive map of Crivac
- Location of Crivac in Croatia
- Coordinates: 43°45′43″N 16°23′05″E
- Country: Croatia
- County: Split-Dalmatia
- Municipality: Muć

Area
  - Total: 15.4 km^{2} (5.9 sq mi)

Population (2021)
  - Total: 290
  - Density: 19/km^{2} (49/sq mi)
- Time zone: UTC+1 (CET)
  - Summer (DST): UTC+2 (CEST)
- Postal code: 21203 Donji Muć
- Area code: +385 (0)21

Crivac is a settlement in the Municipality of Muć in Croatia. In 2021, its population was 290.

== Demographics ==
Crivac: Population trends 1857–2021
v

population	438	439	487	495	592	590	580	674	648	618	587	643	609	472	411	310	290
	1857	1869	1880	1890	1900	1910	1921	1931	1948	1953	1961	1971	1981	1991	2001	2011	2021

Sources: Croatian Bureau of Statistics publications
