= Kodrion =

Ancient town in Illyria

Kodrion, Codrion or Codrio (Ancient Greek: Κόδριον, romanized: Kodrion; Latin: Codrio/Codrion) was an ancient town in southern Illyria, located somewhere to the north of Mount Tomorr, in present-day Albania. The settlement have been presumably identified with the archaeological remains of a fortified site at Kalaja e Irmajt, in the district of Gramsh. The town is mentioned in the events concerning the Illyrian Wars and Macedonian Wars.

Roman writer Livy describes Codrio as a sufficiently strong and fortified town (oppidum). It was located in a strategic position enough to warrant a Roman garrison after its capture.

The name of the town is certainly pre-Roman. A Paleo-Balkan origin has been suggested, relating it to the Albanian: kodër (definite form: kodra) 'hill', and Romanian: codru '(wooded) mountain, forest', with the same root as the ancient toponym Scodra (present-day Shkodër).

== See also ==
- List of settlements in Illyria
