= Damastion =

Ancient Illyrian city known for its silver mines and coinage

Damastion was an ancient city located somewhere in the west-central Balkans, known for its silver coins dating back to the 4th century BC. It is attested only in Strabo who says that the city had silver-mines and locates it in Illyria. The ancient author reports that the city was under the authority of the Illyrian tribes of Dyestes and Enchelei-Sesarethii, and that Aegina colonized it. At 356–358 B.C. the mines came under the control of Macedon.

The exact site of Damastion is not yet identified with certainty. Various sites in Albania, North Macedonia and Kosovo have been considered as the location of this ancient town.

== Location ==
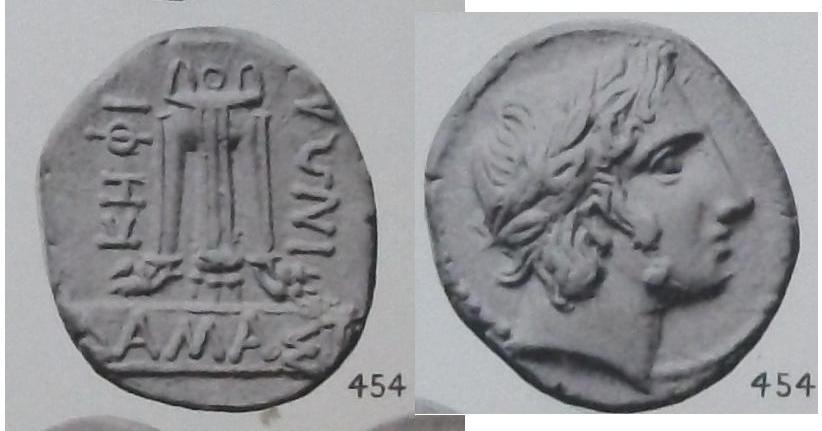
Silver coin of Damastion, 4th century BC. Obv.:Apollo head, laureate. Rev.:sacrificial tripod, letters ΔΑΜΑΣΤΙΝΩΝ (of the Damastians) - ΚΗΦΙ.

Damastion was an important mint since the 4th century and was located near silver mines. Most silver coins bearing the inscription ΔΑMAΣTION were found just northeast of Janjevo, near Novo Brdo. Based on studies carried out by mining geologists and archaeologists, some scholars have argued that the location of Damastion was most likely in the territory of modern Kosovo, which made up the core area of ancient Dardania, neighbored by ancient Paeonia. Other scholars have argued that Damastion's location appears to have been within southern Illyrian territory since Strabo connects the city with the Dyestes and Enchelei, but not the Dardani.

There are a number of other scholars who believe its location might have been somewhere near present-day Resen, north or northeast of Lake Ohrid in modern-day North Macedonia.

== History ==
The Illyrian state controlled the mines of Damastion at least from the 5th century BC. The silver mines of Damastion increased the interest of the Greeks in Illyrian territory. In the 431 BC Greeks from Aegina had colonised the city.

The silver mines of Damastion were close to Dassaretia, a region centered around Lake Lychnidus (present-day Lake Ohrid). Damastion began to mint coinage from the end of the 5th century BC. Although the site of the mines of Damastion remains still unlocated, the rise of the earliest remarkable Illyrian coinage in the lakeland coincided with the earliest known important consolidation of Illyrian military power in the same region. In 4th century BC the city, and its inhabitants Damastini, were subject most likely to the Illyrian king Bardylis. The circulation of the coins of Damastion included Dardania (today's Kosovo and its surrounding areas) up to the west, to the southern Adriatic coast.

The city and its silver mines were most likely captured by Philip II of Macedon after he defeated Illyrian king Bardyllis. At the time of Alexander the Great's Balkan campaign, in particular in Illyria, the autonomous minting of Damastion ceased, meanwhile Macedonian coins of Alexander and his father Philip II appear in the region, suggesting that the kings of Macedon have set up a unified monetary system by capturing all the metal resources available in the region.

The coinage of Damastion lasted until about 280 BC, or until the Celtic invasion of the Balkans, when the region was destabilized.

== See also ==
- List of ancient cities in Illyria

== Bibliography ==
- Buqinca, Arianit (2021). Recherche sur les Dardaniens : VIe- Ier siècles av. J.- C. (Thesis) (in French). Université de Lyon. OCLC 1254025622.
- Castiglioni, Maria Paola (2010). Cadmos-serpent en Illyrie: itinéraire d'un héros civilisateur. Edizioni Plus. ISBN 9788884927422.
- Greenwalt, William S. (2011). "Macedonia, Illyria and Epirus". In Roisman, Joseph; Worthington, Ian (eds.). A Companion to Ancient Macedonia. John Wiley & Sons. pp. 279–305. ISBN 978-1-4443-5163-7.
- Lippert, Andreas; Matzinger, Joachim (2021). Die Illyrer: Geschichte, Archäologie und Sprache. Kohlhammer Verlag. ISBN 9783170377103.
- Šašel Kos, Marjeta (1993). "Cadmus and Harmonia in Illyria". Arheološki Vestnik. 44: 113–136.
- Shpuza, Saimir (2022). La Romanisation de l'Illyrie méridionale et de la Chaônie. Collection de l'École française de Rome. Publications de l'École française de Rome. ISBN 9782728310982.
- Viktorija Sokolovska, Pajonskoto Pleme Agrijani i vrskite so Damastion, Maced. acta Archaeologica 11, Skopje 1990, 9-34. (with summary in French).
- Viktorija Sokolovska, The localization of Damastion revisited, MACEDONIAN NUMISMATIC JOURNAL 5, Skopje 2011, 7-13.
- Viktorija Sokolovska, USTE EDNAS ZA UBIKACIJATA NA DAMASTION, KOMENTARI Za nekoi prasanja od Antickoto minato na Makedonija, Skopje 2005, 69-81.
- Viktorija Sokolovska, The Coinage of Agrianes, MACEDONIAN NUMISMATIC JOURNAL, No. 2, Skopje 1996, 13-22.
- Zimi, Eleni (2006). "Illyrians". In Wilson, Nigel (ed.). Encyclopedia of Ancient Greece. Routledge. pp. 376–377. ISBN 9781136787997.
