= Donje Ogorje =

Settlement in Split-Dalmatia County, Croatia

- Settlement
- Interactive map of Donje Ogorje
- Location of Donje Ogorje in Croatia
- Coordinates: 43°44′21″N 16°26′18″E
- Country: Croatia
- County: Split-Dalmatia
- Municipality: Muć

Area
  - Total: 14.1 km^{2} (5.4 sq mi)

Population (2021)
  - Total: 107
  - Density: 7.59/km^{2} (19.7/sq mi)
- Time zone: UTC+1 (CET)
  - Summer (DST): UTC+2 (CEST)
- Postal code: 21203 Donji Muć
- Area code: +385 (0)21

Donje Ogorje is a settlement in the Municipality of Muć in Croatia. In 2021, its population was 107.

== Demographics ==
Donje Ogorje: Population trends 1857–2021
v

population	361	502	328	362	423	472	472	544	472	475	404	323	240	154	114	116	107
	1857	1869	1880	1890	1900	1910	1921	1931	1948	1953	1961	1971	1981	1991	2001	2011	2021

Sources: Croatian Bureau of Statistics publications
