= Andetrium =

Coordinates: 43°41′26″N 16°29′2″E

- Location within Croatia
- Type: Settlement
- Periods: Classical, Roman
- Cultures: Illyrian, Roman
- Location: Muć, Split-Dalmatia County, Croatia
- Region: Illyria

Site notes
- Owner: Public

Andetrium was an ancient city in Illyria, located in modern day Muć or Gornji Muć in the interior of Dalmatia, Croatia.

Andetrium was the location of a Roman cohort in the territory of the Delmatae. During a Roman siege there in AD 9, Arminius's younger brother Flavus lost an eye.

== See also ==
- List of Illyrian cities
