= Donje Postinje =

Settlement in Split-Dalmatia County, Croatia

- Settlement
- Interactive map of Donje Postinje
- Location of Donje Postinje in Croatia
- Coordinates: 43°42′32″N 16°23′42″E
- Country: Croatia
- County: Split-Dalmatia
- Municipality: Muć

Area
  - Total: 7.6 km^{2} (2.9 sq mi)

Population (2021)
  - Total: 84
  - Density: 11/km^{2} (29/sq mi)
- Time zone: UTC+1 (CET)
  - Summer (DST): UTC+2 (CEST)
- Postal code: 21203 Donji Muć
- Area code: +385 (0)21

Donje Postinje is a settlement in the Municipality of Muć in Croatia. In 2021, its population was 84.

== Demographics ==
Donje Postinje: Population trends 1857–2021
v

population	289	261	266	254	265	319	319	466	403	369	336	217	187	96	104	78	84
	1857	1869	1880	1890	1900	1910	1921	1931	1948	1953	1961	1971	1981	1991	2001	2011	2021

Sources: Croatian Bureau of Statistics publications
