= Thermidava =

Archaeological site

- Ancient Settlement
- Interactive map of Thermidava

Thermidava is a toponym used by Ptolemy in relation to a settlement in the route of the Roman army during the Dacian campaign (101-106 CE) of Emperor Trajan. In the context of Ptolemy's narrative the settlement was located along the Lissus-Naissus route (from present-day northern Albania to present-day eastern Serbia). In present-day Albania, this road ran parallel south of river Drini and met Theranda, whereas Ptolemy's position of Thermidava looks like being north of that river. The only other information about the name 'Thermidava' provided is that when Trajan passed through he was "greeted by friendly Dacians". No pro-Roman Dacians have been recorded in the region, nor is their presence considered likely. Some scholars consider Ptolemy's account to refer to a settlement north of the Danube, near the Banat area where the interests of the locals aligned with those of the Romans in the Dacian campaign. The reference to a -dava settlement within a definitely Illyrian district made its localization within Illyria more unlikely. Thermidava may be a misreading of Theranda (located in Suhareka or Prizren, both in Kosovo). But also in the Peutinger Map, the source for 'Theranda', a lot of names are altered, such as 'ScoBRe' for Scodra. Whatever the real name may have been, Ptolemy placed Thermidava half a degree east of Shkodër, and a quarter of a degree north of it. That localization is not far from the archeological site of Rosujë. This Illyrian town was inhabited from the 5th century BC until the 5th century AD.

On the name, many locations have been proposed and rejected since the 19th century. A reading of the toponym hinted at a compound of Greek thermos and the Thracian suffix -dava or a toponym derived from Dacian. This led to theories that this was a settlement close to thermal springs and Banja of Peja was proposed as a location, but it has been rejected in modern research.

== Bibliography ==
- Lepper, F. A. (1988). Trajan's Column: A New Edition of the Cichorius Plates. Alan Sutton.
- Vasiljević, Ljubiša (2014). Еxploitation and significance of the thermal springs in the Roman period on the territory of Serbia (Thesis). University of Belgrade.
- Papazoglu, Fanula (1978). The Central Balkan Tribes in pre-Roman Times: Triballi, Autariatae, Dardanians, Scordisci and Moesians. Amsterdam: Hakkert.

=== See also ===
- List of ancient cities in Illyria
