= Gornje Postinje =

Settlement in Split-Dalmatia County, Croatia

- Settlement
- Interactive map of Gornje Postinje
- Location of Gornje Postinje in Croatia
- Coordinates: 43°42′04″N 16°25′26″E
- Country: Croatia
- County: Split-Dalmatia
- Municipality: Muć

Area
  - Total: 7.2 km^{2} (2.8 sq mi)

Population (2021)
  - Total: 132
  - Density: 18/km^{2} (47/sq mi)
- Time zone: UTC+1 (CET)
  - Summer (DST): UTC+2 (CEST)
- Postal code: 21203 Donji Muć
- Area code: +385 (0)21

Gornje Postinje is a settlement in the Municipality of Muć in Croatia. In 2021, its population was 132.

== Demographics ==
Gornje Postinje: Population trends 1857–2021
v

population	206	205	188	197	217	237	259	206	250	256	220	203	172	139	138	135	132
	1857	1869	1880	1890	1900	1910	1921	1931	1948	1953	1961	1971	1981	1991	2001	2011	2021

Sources: Croatian Bureau of Statistics publications
