= Neorić =

Settlement in Split-Dalmatia County, Croatia

- Settlement
- Interactive map of Neorić
- Location of Neorić in Croatia
- Coordinates: 43°40′32″N 16°31′27″E
- Country: Croatia
- County: Split-Dalmatia
- Municipality: Muć

Area
  - Total: 18.8 km^{2} (7.3 sq mi)

Population (2021)
  - Total: 819
  - Density: 43.6/km^{2} (113/sq mi)
- Time zone: UTC+1 (CET)
  - Summer (DST): UTC+2 (CEST)
- Postal code: 21203 Donji Muć
- Area code: +385 (0)21

Neorić is a settlement in the Municipality of Muć in Croatia. In 2021, its population was 819.

== Demographics ==
Neorić: Population trends 1857–2021
v

| population | 587 | 623 | 667 | 703 | 731 | 837 | 837 | 990 | 937 | 950 | 834 | 1028 | 920 | 893 | 871 | 883 | 819 |
| | 1857 | 1869 | 1880 | 1890 | 1900 | 1910 | 1921 | 1931 | 1948 | 1953 | 1961 | 1971 | 1981 | 1991 | 2001 | 2011 | 2021 |

Sources: Croatian Bureau of Statistics publications
