= Velika Milešina =

Settlement in Split-Dalmatia County, Croatia

- Settlement
- Interactive map of Velika Milešina
- Location of Velika Milešina in Croatia
- Coordinates: 43°45′46″N 16°26′25″E
- Country: Croatia
- County: Split-Dalmatia
- Municipality: Muć

Area
  - Total: 5.5 km^{2} (2.1 sq mi)

Population (2021)
  - Total: 24
  - Density: 4.4/km^{2} (11/sq mi)
- Time zone: UTC+1 (CET)
  - Summer (DST): UTC+2 (CEST)
- Postal code: 21203 Donji Muć
- Area code: +385 (0)21

Velika Milešina is a settlement in the Municipality of Muć in Croatia. In 2021, its population was 24.

== Demographics ==
Velika Milešina: Population trends 1857–2021
v

| population | 284 | 312 | 317 | 323 | 355 | 233 | 233 | 255 | 252 | 222 | 208 | 118 | 77 | 35 | 34 | 33 | 24 |
| | 1857 | 1869 | 1880 | 1890 | 1900 | 1910 | 1921 | 1931 | 1948 | 1953 | 1961 | 1971 | 1981 | 1991 | 2001 | 2011 | 2021 |

Sources: Croatian Bureau of Statistics publications
