= Gizdavac =

Settlement in Split-Dalmatia County, Croatia

- Settlement
- Interactive map of Gizdavac
- Location of Gizdavac in Croatia
- Coordinates: 43°39′04″N 16°28′12″E
- Country: Croatia
- County: Split-Dalmatia
- Municipality: Muć

Area
  - Total: 11.4 km^{2} (4.4 sq mi)

Population (2021)
  - Total: 109
  - Density: 9.56/km^{2} (24.8/sq mi)
- Time zone: UTC+1 (CET)
  - Summer (DST): UTC+2 (CEST)
- Postal code: 21203 Donji Muć
- Area code: +385 (0)21

Gizdavac is a settlement in the Municipality of Muć in Croatia. In 2021, its population was 109.

== Demographics ==
Gizdavac: Population trends 1857–2021
v

population	263	250	250	261	303	336	336	370	308	291	264	165	143	109	101	127	109
	1857	1869	1880	1890	1900	1910	1921	1931	1948	1953	1961	1971	1981	1991	2001	2011	2021

Sources: Croatian Bureau of Statistics publications
