= Mirna (Adriatic Sea) =

River in Croatia

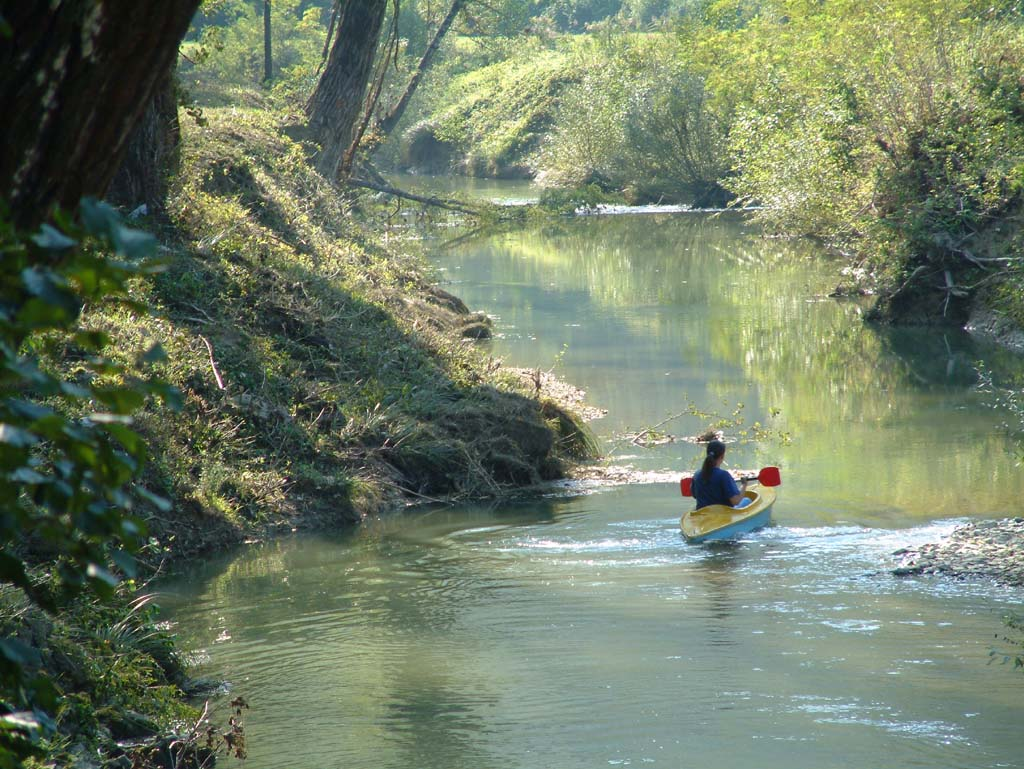
- The Mirna River in Istria, Croatia

Location
- Country: Croatia

Physical characteristics
- Mouth
  - location: Adriatic Sea
  - coordinates: 45.3164°N 13.5948°E
- Length: 53 km (33 mi)
- Basin size: 458 km^{2} (177 sq mi)

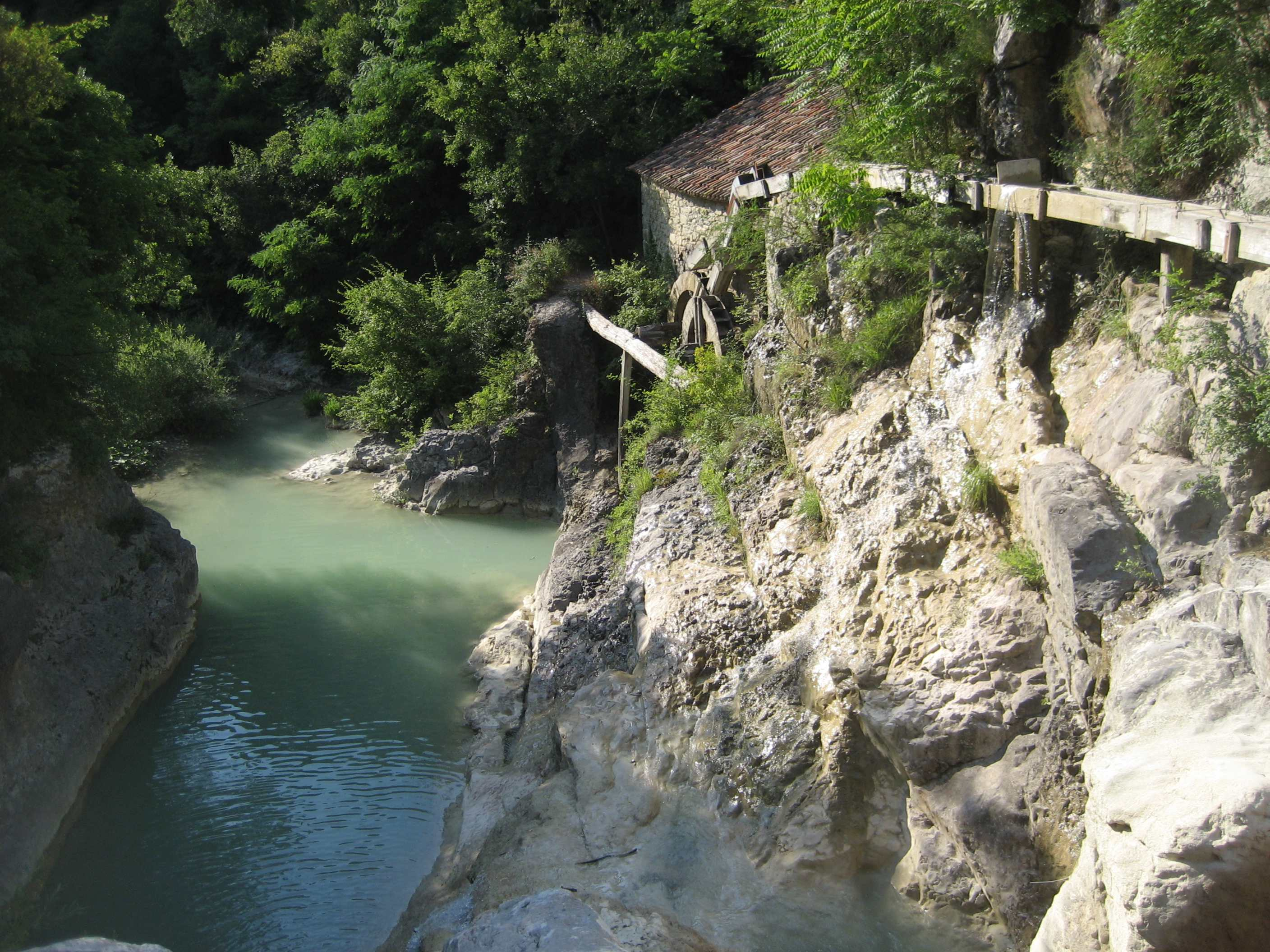
Another Image of the Mirna River

The Mirna (Italian: Quieto) is a river in Istria, Croatia. In ancient times it was called the Aquilis. It is Istria's longest and richest river, being 53 km (33 mi) long and having a basin covering an area of 458 km^{2} (177 mi^{2}). It rises near Buzet, passes along Motovun and empties into the Adriatic Sea at Antenal, near Novigrad.
