= Vladimir Beara =

Yugoslav footballer and manager

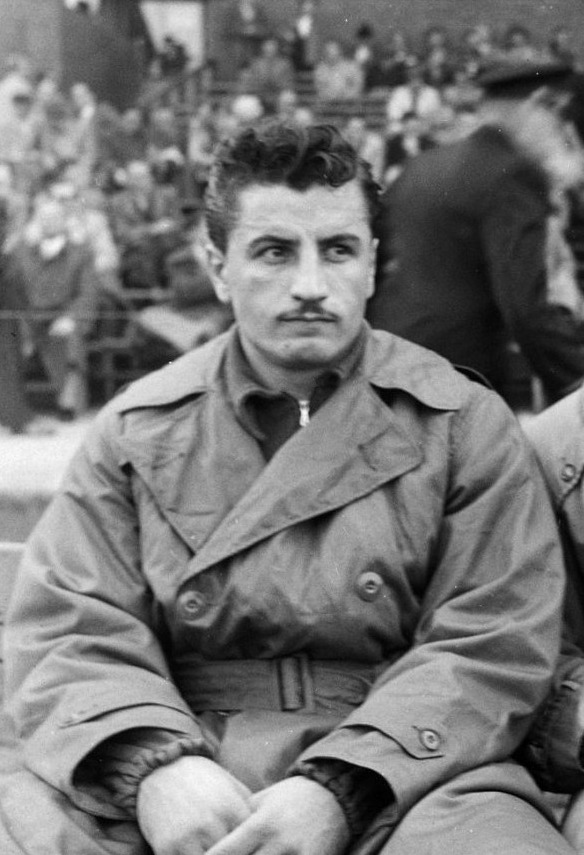
- Beara in 1953

Personal information
- Date of birth: 26 August 1928
- Place of birth: Zelovo Sutinsko, Kingdom of Serbs, Croats and Slovenes
- Date of death: 11 August 2014 (aged 85)
- Place of death: Split, Croatia
- Height: 1.84 m (6 ft 0 in)
- Position: Goalkeeper

Senior career*
Years	Team	Apps	(Gls)
1947–1955	Hajduk Split	136	(0)
1955–1960	Red Star Belgrade	83	(0)
1960–1963	Alemannia Aachen	23	(0)
1963–1964	Viktoria Köln	23	(0)
Total		265	(0)

International career
1950–1959	Yugoslavia	59	(0)

Managerial career
- 1964–1966: Freiburger FC
- 1966–1967: Sittardia
- 1967–1968: Rijeka
- 1969–1970: SC Fortuna Köln
- 1970–1973: Hajduk Split (assistant)
- 1973: Osijek
- 1974: Troglav Livno
- 1974–1975: Cameroon
- Dinara
- Bregalnica Štip
- 1979: First Vienna FC
- 1980–1981: RNK Split
- 1986–1987: BŠK Zmaj Blato
Medal record
Men's Football
Representing Yugoslavia
Olympic Games
Silver medal – second place	1952 Helsinki	Team
- * Club domestic league appearances and goals

Vladimir Beara (Serbian Cyrillic: Владимир Беара; pronounced [ʋlǎdimiːr beâra]; 26 August 1928 – 11 August 2014) was a Yugoslav football goalkeeper and manager. He played the vast majority of his professional club career for Hajduk Split and Red Star Belgrade in the Yugoslav Federal League and for the Yugoslavia national football team. He is considered to have been one of the best goalkeepers of his era.

== Early life ==
Beara was born into an ethnic Serb family to parents Jakov and Marija in the village of Zelovo Sutinsko near Sinj in present-day Croatia. He had two brothers named Ljubo and Sveto. According to Split-based journalist Zdravko Reić, Beara declared himself as a Croat in the state censuses.

== Club career ==
For Hajduk Split (1946–55) Beara played 308 games, and helped his team to win the Yugoslav League title in 1950, 1952 and 1955.

He made, however, a transfer in 1955 to Belgrade's Red Star (1955–60), after the season he had won the third league title. With Red Star he won even more Yugoslav league titles, in 1956, 1957, 1959, 1960, and won the Yugoslav Cup in 1958 and 1959. He was Red Star's goalkeeper against Manchester United in the last game United had played before the Munich air disaster. In 1963, the great Soviet goalkeeper, Lev Yashin said that not him, but Vladimir Beara is the greatest keeper of all time.

Beara ended his career in German clubs Alemannia Aachen (1960–62) and Viktoria Köln (1963–64).

== International career ==
Beara played 59 games for the Yugoslavia national team between 1950 and 1960. Immediately after being selected to play for the Yugoslavia national team, he became famous mostly due to his fabulous stops in a match against England at Highbury Stadium of Arsenal. Since then he was often called by his nickname Vladimir Veliki. Beara participated in the 1952 Summer Olympic Games; he was a member of the team that reached the final against Hungary, winning a silver medal. He also represented his nation in three World Cups; World Cup 1950, World Cup 1954 and World Cup 1958. In 1953, Beara was one of four Yugoslav players on the FIFA World-Stars XI who played an exhibition game against England; the match finished in a 4–4 draw, with Beara conceding only one goal.

== Coaching career ==
In 1967 Beara finished a coaching course at the sports academy at the German Sport University Cologne, today's Hennes Weisweiler Academy. He went on to coach clubs in Germany, the Netherlands, Austria and Yugoslavia as well as the national team of Cameroon. A highlight of his coaching career was winning the Yugoslav national championship with Hajduk Split in 1971 as assistant coach to Slavko Luštica. This was the club's first championship since his departure as player in 1955. He also won the African Cup Winners' Cup with Tonnerre Yaoundé in 1975.

== Death ==
On 11 August 2014, Beara's family announced that he died in Split, Croatia after several strokes over the previous year. He was buried in the Catholic Lovrinac Cemetery. The decision made by Beara's widow Jadranka to bury him at a Catholic cemetery was met with criticism, because Beara was a staunch believer of the Serbian Orthodox Church.

== Style of play ==
Beara was an athletic and self-confident keeper, endowed with an eye-catching but effective style. His grip on the ball and his attitude helped him become a good shot-stopper and excel at coming off his line. He was nicknamed "the ballet dancer with the hands of steel" due to his ability to combine elegance with goalkeeping skills.

== Quotes ==
"A good goalkeeper still has to be a lot like he was in my time. He has to have courage and self-confidence."

— Beara himself on goalkeepers.

"My confidence in goal, the way I seemed to be able to catch a ball easily, and my technique for taming shots I put down to Barba Luka. It was a simple drill we did in practice. He made me catch a small ball about the size of a baseball and after that it was very easy for me to catch a football."

— Beara himself on his goalkeeping technique.

"There was an entertaining, aesthetic air about him, that's why his jumps and dives with feet curled and body perfectly poised appealed. He kept goal on his toes, like a coiled spring, always ready to pounce."

— Bob Wilson on Beara.

"I am not the best goalkeeper in the world, it is Vladimir Beara."

— Lev Yashin, the only goalkeeper who received the award Ballon d'Or, in 1963.

== Honours ==
Hajduk Split

- Yugoslav First League: 1950, 1952, 1954–55

Red Star Belgrade

- Yugoslav First League: 1955–56, 1956–57, 1958–59, 1959–60
- Yugoslav Football Cup: 1957–58, 1958–59

Yugoslavia

- Olympic Games: Silver Medal 1952
