= Pribude =

Settlement in Split-Dalmatia County, Croatia

- Settlement
- Interactive map of Pribude
- Location of Pribude in Croatia
- Coordinates: 43°46′30″N 16°23′52″E
- Country: Croatia
- County: Split-Dalmatia
- Municipality: Muć

Area
  - Total: 10.4 km^{2} (4.0 sq mi)

Population (2021)
  - Total: 56
  - Density: 5.4/km^{2} (14/sq mi)
- Time zone: UTC+1 (CET)
  - Summer (DST): UTC+2 (CEST)
- Postal code: 21203 Donji Muć
- Area code: +385 (0)21

Pribude is a settlement in the Municipality of Muć in Croatia. In 2021, its population was 56.

== Demographics ==
Pribude: Population trends 1857–2021
v

population	227	279	284	319	354	339	339	409	401	347	344	346	284	193	126	102	56
	1857	1869	1880	1890	1900	1910	1921	1931	1948	1953	1961	1971	1981	1991	2001	2011	2021

Sources: Croatian Bureau of Statistics publications
