= Nareste =

Settlement in ancient Illyria

Nareste was an ancient settlement on the territory of the Illyrian Delmatae. The contemporary location is probably the village of Jesenice, near Omiš, in Croatia.

== See also ==
- List of settlements in Illyria
