= Zelovo, Muć =

Zelovo
- Village
- Location within Croatia
- Coordinates: 43°43′45″N 16°31′53″E
- Country: Croatia
- County: Split-Dalmatia County
- Municipality: Muć

Area
  - Total: 14.2 km^{2} (5.5 sq mi)
- Elevation: 326 m (1,070 ft)

Population (2021)
  - Total: 35
  - Density: 2.5/km^{2} (6.4/sq mi)
- Time zone: UTC+1 (CET)
  - Summer (DST): UTC+2 (CEST)
- Postal code: 21203 Donji Muć
- Area code: +385 21

Zelovo is a village in Croatia in the municipality of Muć. It was known as Zelovo Sutinsko until 1991.

== Population ==
According to the 2011 census, Zelovo had 10 inhabitants.

== Notable people ==
- Goalkeeper Vladimir Beara was born in the village.
