= Oneum =

City in ancient Illyria

Oneum (Ancient Greek: Ὀναῖον) was an Illyrian settlement of the Delmatae.

The probable location of Oneum is today's Omiš.

== See also ==
- List of ancient cities in Illyria
