= Sutina, Croatia =

Settlement in Split-Dalmatia County, Croatia

Sutina
- Settlement
- Interactive map of Sutina
- Location of Sutina in Croatia
- Coordinates: 43°41′38″N 16°31′51″E
- Country: Croatia
- County: Split-Dalmatia
- Municipality: Muć

Area
  - Total: 11.0 km^{2} (4.2 sq mi)

Population (2021)
  - Total: 341
  - Density: 31.0/km^{2} (80.3/sq mi)
- Time zone: UTC+1 (CET)
  - Summer (DST): UTC+2 (CEST)
- Postal code: 21203 Donji Muć
- Area code: +385 (0)21

Sutina is a settlement in the Municipality of Muć in Croatia. In 2021, its population was 341.

== Demographics ==
Sutina: Population trends 1857–2021
v

population	247	439	260	276	299	297	410	388	429	507	527	546	409	356	313	349	341
	1857	1869	1880	1890	1900	1910	1921	1931	1948	1953	1961	1971	1981	1991	2001	2011	2021

Sources: Croatian Bureau of Statistics publications
