= Pituntium =

Illyrian fortified settlement of the Delmatae

Pituntium was an Illyrian settlement of the Delmatae. The probable location is the coastal village of Sveti Martin in the municipality of Podstrana near Split and Omiš. There are findings of a necropolis, around the church of St Martin, and of a residential and commercial complex, nearby.

== See also ==
- List of settlements in Illyria
