= Berginium =

Coordinates: 45°08′N 17°15′E

Berginium was an Illyrian town, near Servitium in present-day Bosnia and Herzegovina.
