= Setovia =

Illyrian fortified settlement

Setovia was an Illyrian fortified settlement of the Delmatae.

It was located at an unknown location in the modern-day Sinjsko polje, and was besieged by Octavian's Roman troops in 34–33 BC. Some Roman stone inscriptions were found near Vrlika and Kijevo that indicate Setovia was nearby.

== See also ==
- List of ancient cities in Illyria
