= Gornji Muć =

Settlement in Split-Dalmatia County, Croatia

- Settlement
- Interactive map of Gornji Muć
- Location of Gornji Muć in Croatia
- Coordinates: 43°41′20″N 16°29′02″E
- Country: Croatia
- County: Split-Dalmatia
- Municipality: Muć

Area
  - Total: 8.9 km^{2} (3.4 sq mi)

Population (2021)
  - Total: 450
  - Density: 51/km^{2} (130/sq mi)
- Time zone: UTC+1 (CET)
  - Summer (DST): UTC+2 (CEST)
- Postal code: 21203 Donji Muć
- Area code: +385 (0)21

Gornji Muć is a settlement in the Municipality of Muć in Croatia. In 2021, its population was 450.

== Demographics ==
Gornji Muć: Population trends 1857–2021
v

population	355	572	614	718	759	854	832	946	841	942	885	856	697	562	522	530	450
	1857	1869	1880	1890	1900	1910	1921	1931	1948	1953	1961	1971	1981	1991	2001	2011	2021

Sources: Croatian Bureau of Statistics publications
