= Caska, Croatia =

Village in Lika-Senj County, Croatia

Caska Chissa
- Village
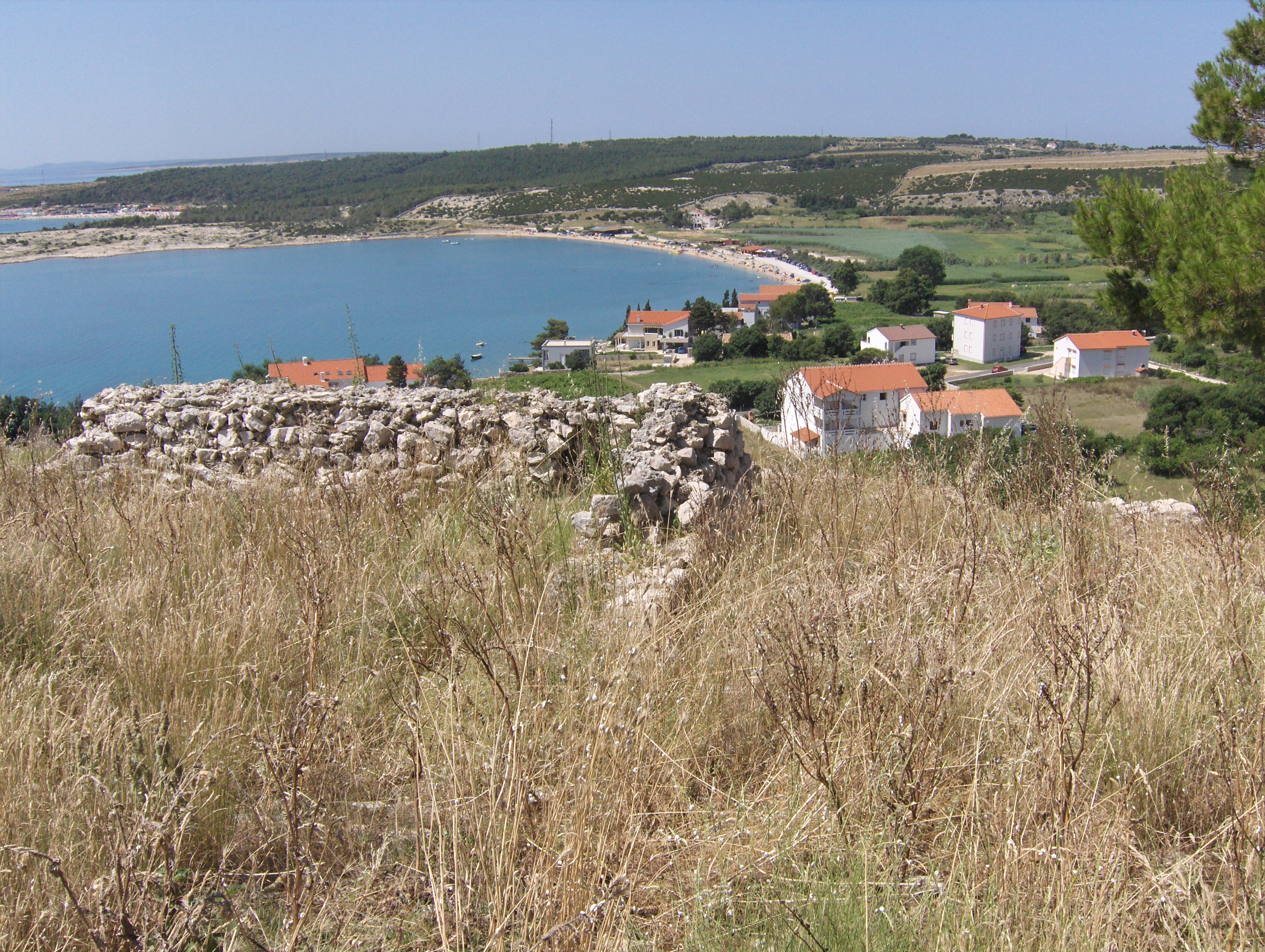
- View of Caska

- Location within Croatia
- Coordinates: 44.55049°N 14.92019°E
- Country: Croatia
- County: Lika-Senj
- Town: Novalja

Area
  - Total: 0.9 km^{2} (0.35 sq mi)

Population (2021)
  - Total: 24
  - Density: 27/km^{2} (69/sq mi)
- Time zone: UTC+1 (CET)
  - Summer (DST): UTC+2 (CEST)
- Postal code: 53 296
- Vehicle registration: GS

Caska (Italian: Chissa) is a village on the Croatian island of Pag in Lika-Senj County, at the end of Caska Cove. Administratively, it is part of the town of Novalja. As of 2021, it had a population of 24.

Near the village are the ruins of an ancient Roman settlement, Cissa. This settlement is believed to have sunk during an earthquake in the 4th century.

== Bibliography ==
=== Biology ===
- Šašić, Martina; Nahirnić, Ana; Tarmann, Gerhard M. (2016-12-31). "Zygaenidae (Lepidoptera) in the Lepidoptera collections of the Croatian Natural History Museum". Natura Croatica: Periodicum Musei Historiae Naturalis Croatici. 25 (2): 233–248. doi:10.20302/NC.2016.25.19. eISSN 1848-7386.
