= Muć =

Municipality in Split-Dalmatia County, Croatia

- Location within Croatia
- Coordinates: 43°40′48″N 16°31′48″E
- Country: Croatia
- Region: Dalmatian Hinterland
- County: Split-Dalmatia County

Area
  - Total: 222.5 km^{2} (85.9 sq mi)

Population (2021)
  - Total: 3,465
  - Density: 15.57/km^{2} (40.33/sq mi)
- Time zone: UTC+1 (CET)
  - Summer (DST): UTC+2 (CEST)
- Website: muc.hr

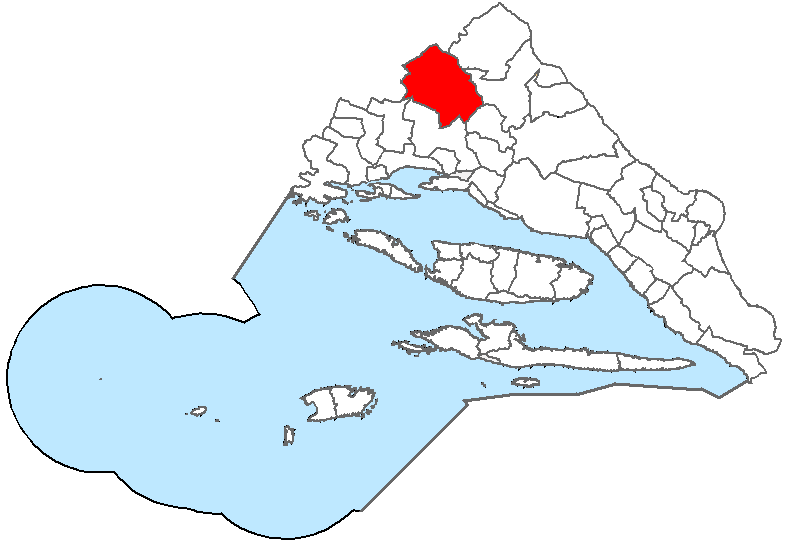

Muć is a village and a municipality in Croatia within the Split-Dalmatia County.

The municipality is named after the twin villages of Gornji Muć (lit. Upper) and Donji Muć (lit. Lower).

== Demographics ==
In the 2011 census, the total population of the municipality was 3,882, in the following settlements:

- Bračević, population 182
- Crivac, population 310
- Donje Ogorje, population 116
- Donje Postinje, population 78
- Donji Muć, population 590
- Gizdavac, population 127
- Gornje Ogorje, population 163
- Gornje Postinje, population 135
- Gornji Muć, population 530
- Mala Milešina, population 21
- Neorić, population 883
- Pribude, population 102
- Radunić, population 86
- Ramljane, population 167
- Sutina, population 349
- Velika Milešina, population 33
- Zelovo, population 10
Muć: Population trends 1857–2021
v

population	5802	5999	6200	6641	7373	8048	8038	9263	8714	8623	8012	7319	5887	4676	4074	3882	3465
	1857	1869	1880	1890	1900	1910	1921	1931	1948	1953	1961	1971	1981	1991	2001	2011	2021

Sources: Croatian Bureau of Statistics publications

== Notable people ==
- Petar Bergamo
- Željko Kerum
