= Asseria =

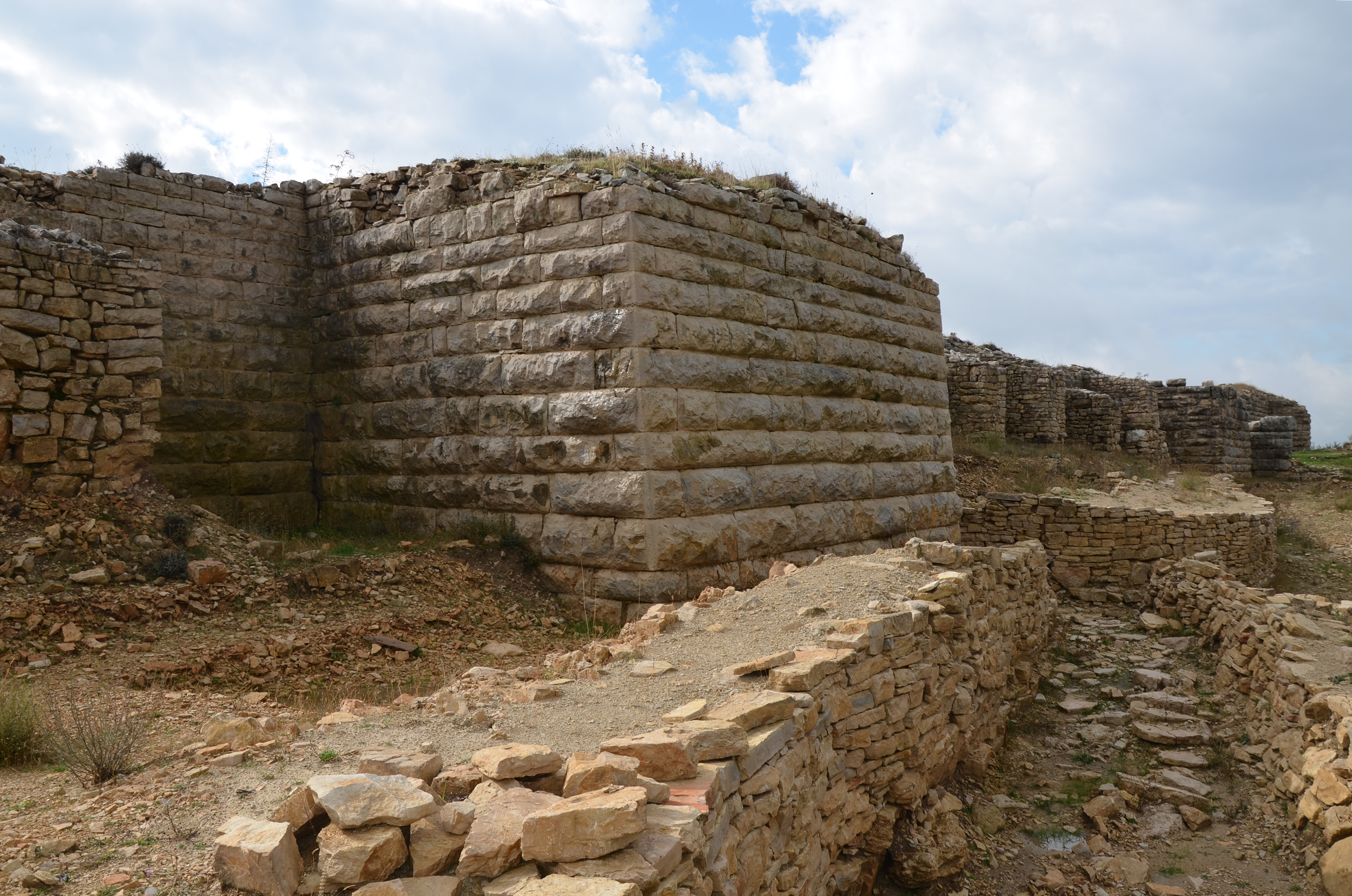
- City walls of Asseria

- Location within Croatia
- 44.00995°N 15.66792°E
- Type: Hillfort / City
- Periods: Iron Age / Roman
- Location: Croatia

Asseria was an ancient settlement located at Podgrađe, Benkovac around 30 kilometres east of Zadar in Croatia.

In pre-Roman times Asseria was an important centre in south Liburnia for the Asseriates tribe.

In the 1st century AD it became a Roman military post and later developed into a market centre.

It lay along the important Roman road connecting the colony of Iader to the capital Salona via other towns such as Burnum, Nedinum and Varvaria.

It is mentioned by Pliny the Elder as being exempted by Rome from the payment of tribute. It was probably granted municipium status under Claudius and enrolled in the tribus Claudia.

Parts of Asseria's city walls have survived, as well as a triumphal arch erected in 113 AD during the time of Trajan. The city walls are of ashlar, predating Roman occupation. Excavations have uncovered the 1st-century Roman forum, as well as a likely basilica.

Water was supplied by a 3 km-long aqueduct from the spring of Čatrnja in the village of Lisičić.

Finds from the excavations are at the Archaeological Museum in Zadar.
