= Amantes (tribe) =

Ancient tribe in southern Albania

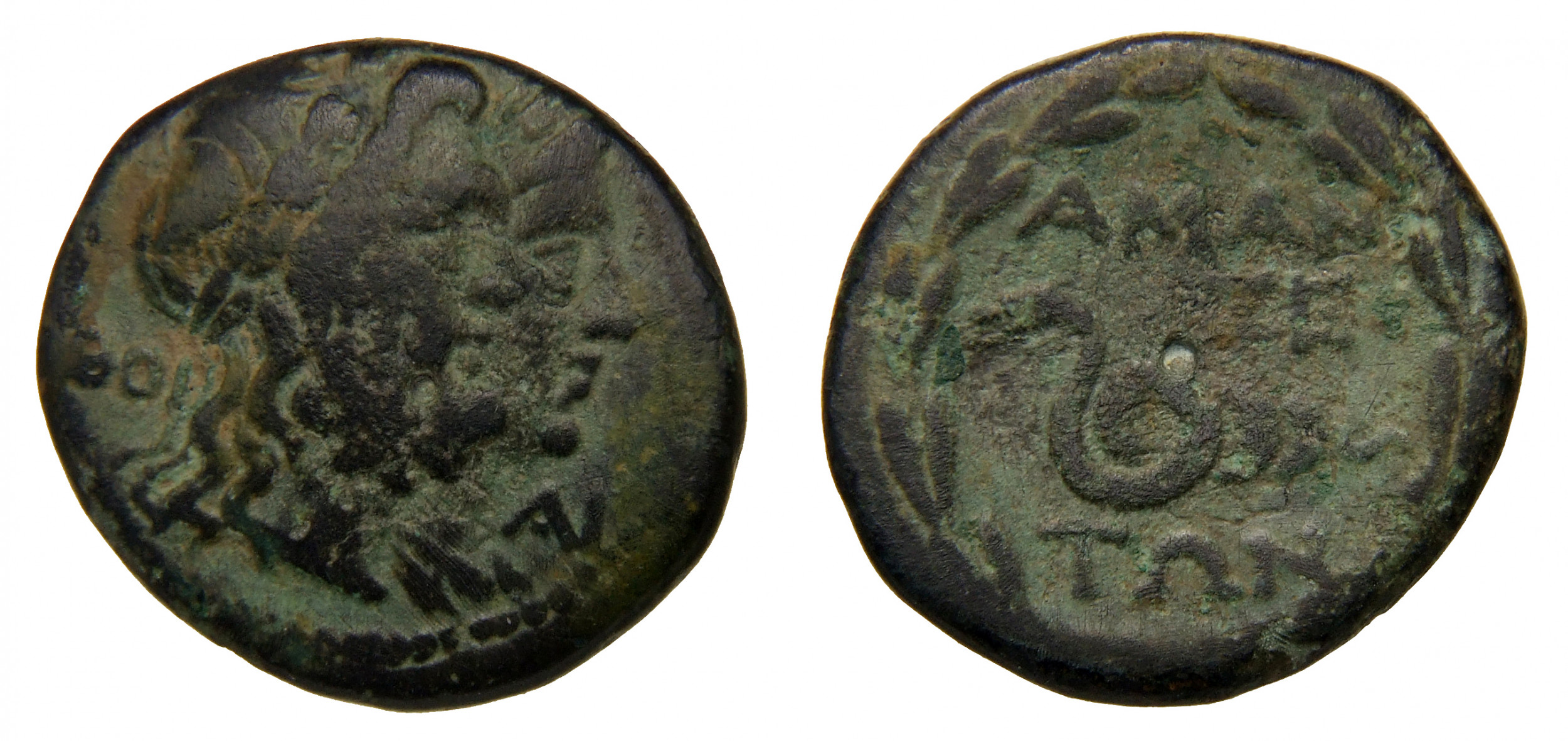
A bronze coin bearing with the heads of Zeus and Dione on the obverse (left) and the legend ΑΜΑΝΤΩΝ (AMANTON) and a serpent on the reverse (right).

The Amantes (alternatively attested in primary sources, as Amantieis or Amantini; Ancient Greek: Ἄμαντες or Αμαντιεῖς; Latin: Amantinii) were an ancient tribe located in the inland area of the Bay of Vlora north of the Ceraunian Mountains and south of Apollonia, in southern Illyria near the boundary with Epirus, nowadays modern Albania. A site of their location has been identified with the archaeological settlement of Amantia, placed above the river Vjosë/Aoos. Amantia is considered to have been their main settlement. The Amantes also inhabited in the area of an ancient sanctuary of the eternal fire called Nymphaion.

The Amantes firstly appear in ancient literature in the 4th century BCE in the Periplus of Pseudo-Skylax as an Illyrian tribe bordering the Epirote Chaonians. In Hellenistic sources they are mentioned among the Epirotes. In Roman-times literature they appear as barbarians. In modern historiography a number of scholars regard the Amantes as Illyrians, and others consider them as Epirotes.

Although no definite evidence has been found to ensure the establishment of a political organisation of the Amantes as a koinon, its institution is indicated by archaeological findings in the area. The tribal polity (perhaps a koinon) of the Amantes and the koinon of the Bylliones are today considered important examples of Illyrian koina, organized in a manned similar to the Koinon of the Epirotes.

== Name ==
The name is first attested in the Periplus of Pseudo-Skylax in the mid-4th century BCE. It has been suggested that the ethnonym Amantes contains the Indo-European stem ab- "water, river", as the interchanging -m- to -b- can be found in Greek, while the shift -b- to -m- can be found in Thracian and Illyrian, and is characteristic of the north Aegean region. Whether the name Amantes corresponded to the interchanging of -b- to -m- is disputed. Some ancient sources merged the term Abantes with Amantes, and the name of the territory of Abantis with that of Amantia. Stephanus of Byzantium attributed this variation in spelling to Antigonus Gonatas, which was afterwards adopted by some Hellenistic poets.

It has been suggested that the names Amantes and Amantia are connected with the Albanian term amë/ãmë ("river-bed, fountain, spring"). The tribal name Amantes, in particular, has been translated as "riparians". A homonymous Illyrian tribe lived in eastern Slavonia.

== Geography ==
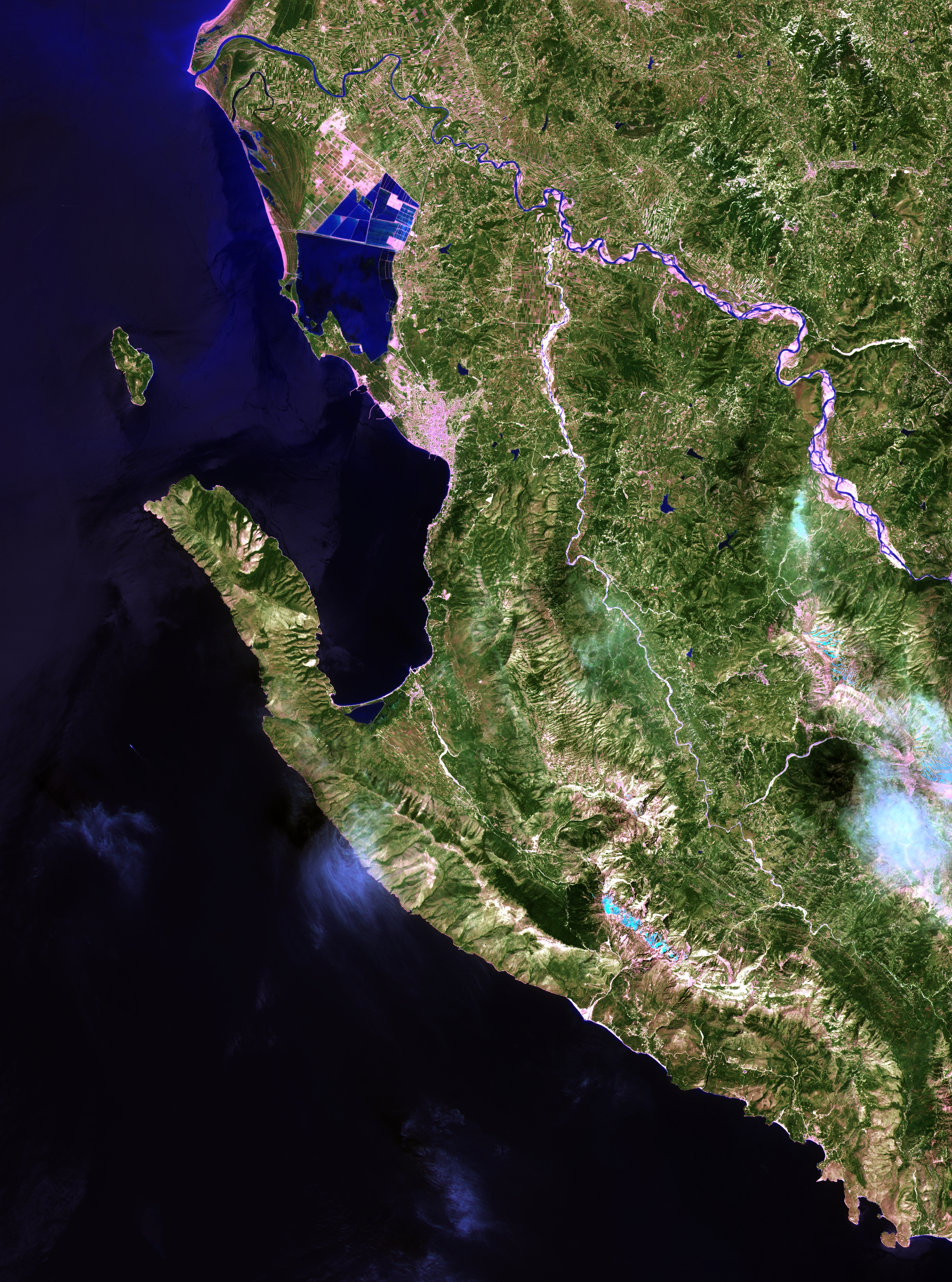

The territory of the Amantes was located around the left shore of the lower Aoos valley and inland of the Bay of Vlorë, and it was known as Amantia, which was interpreted by ancient Greeks as Abantia in Hellenistic times.

The chief seat of their tribal community has been identified with the archaeological settlement of Amantia, placed above the river Vjosë/Aoos. The city was built around 450 BC on the site of a proto-urban settlement. Already from the beginning it had a fortified acropolis that was surrounded by a 2.1 km long wall, with also a lower town. The original walls made of irregularly slammed limestone were renewed in the 4th century with isodomic ashlar layers.

The territory of the Amantes extended to the east of the Shushicë valley, where the fortresses of Matohasanaj and Cerje marked the southernmost limit of their community, on the border with Chaonia. Those fortifications delimited and protected the country of the Amantes against the Chaonians. In particular the fortress of Matohasanaj served to ensure the security of the Amantian southeastern borders facing the Chaonians established in the Drino valley, around their center of Antigoneia.

With the strategic position of the Matohasanaj settlement, the Amantes were able to control the natural route from Amantia towards Epirus or Macedonia. Their territory stretched westward to the Bay of Vlorë and the Orikos area, while its northwestern limit seems to have been the town of Triport. Kaninë in the Bay of Vlorë provided the main route of the Amantes to the sea. Thronium, a city located in Abantis, was traditionally founded by Ancient Greek colonists on the Bay of Vlorë, however its present-day location has not yet been identified, and a possible placement in Triport or near Kanina has been proposed.

The territorial extension of the state of the Amantes was better suited to the ethnos- or koinon- type organisation than to the polis organisation. Its territory combined agricultural lands and large mountain areas suitable for livestock breeding, summer pastures and winter pastures near the seashore.

Although still unproven, some scholars have suggested that the Amantes along with the Bylliones may have once constituted a part of Atintania forming an Illyrian confederacy.

== Historiography ==
=== Ancient ===
The Amantes are firstly mentioned by Pseudo-Skylax in the 4th century BCE, who regarded them as Illyrioi (Illyrians). Proxenus, Pyrrhus' court historian in the 3rd century BCE, and the lexicographer Hesychius listed the Abantes (a variant form of Amantes), among the Epeirotai (Epirotes). Pliny regarded them as barbarians. Pausanias locates the territory of Abantis in the region of Thesprotia "by the Ceraunian Mountains", and attributed its colonization to Abantes from Eubeoa. Stephanus of Byzantium considered Amantia as part of the land inhabited by Illyrians, which was colonized by the Abantes.

=== Modern ===
Their ethnic origin has been the subject of debate in modern Historiography. Among historians and archaeologists, Fanula Papazoglou considered them to be Illyrian, Arnold J. Toynbee considered them to be Illyrian-speaking, while N. G. L. Hammond considered them to be Greek. Chrisoula Ioakimidou (1997) states that they can't be labeled Greeks with certainty, and that Pliny at least calls them barbari, however according to her they seem to have not been Illyrians. As stated by Winnifrith (2002), some scholars discount the evidence of Pliny that the Abantes/Amantes were barbarians by pointing out that Proxenus and Hesychius call the Abantes "Epirotes", however it is about the Hellenistic period, when Ancient Greek influence did expand towards the north.

The ethnicity of the Amantes is not well established in present-day scholarship. As such, a number of scholars regard them as Illyrians, while others consider them Epirotes.

=== Euboean hypothesis ===
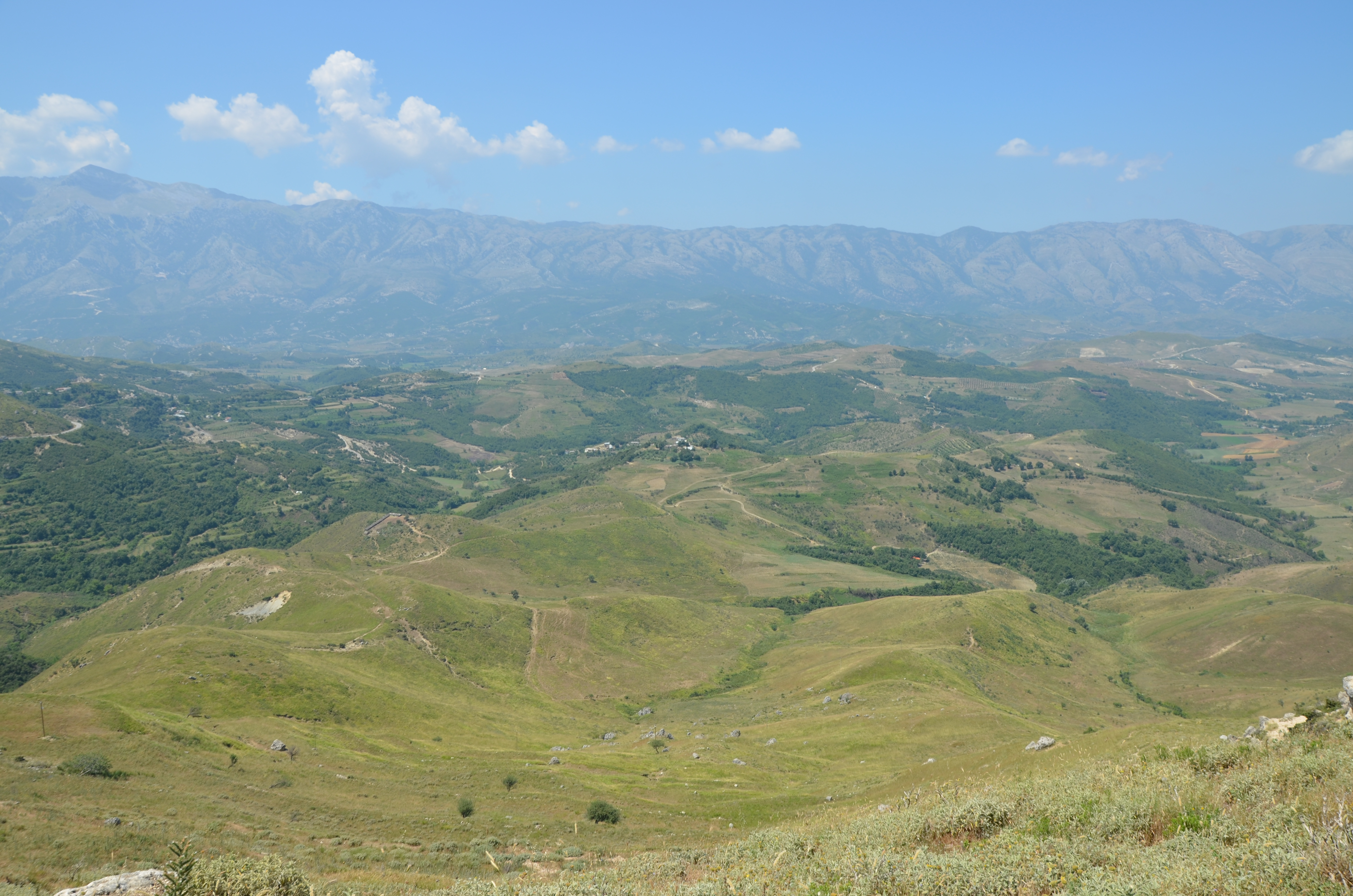
View of the landscape surrounding Amantia.

A mythological story, attested in the work of Pausanias, produced an ancestral connection between them and the Abantes (Ancient Greek: Άβαντες) who were claimed to be colonists in Amantia after their return from the Trojan War. The interpretation of the toponym Amantia as Abantia besides mythological stories has been rationalized as a part of a colonization from Euboia. As part of this connection a local settlement under the name Thronium bears the same name of a Locrian settlement located in Euboia. Although there is some geographic inaccuracy in the description of Pausanias the tradition of the Euboian colonization is dated at least from the 5th century BCE and those toponyms existed since the archaic era (800–480 BCE). The Apollonnians the time they erected their monument in Olympia for their victory in Thronium were aware of these Locrian-Euboian identifications of the territory they had annexed. It has been suggested that the data from Pausanias is more in accordance with the settlement of the Euboean colony in Thronium in the coastal site of Triport located in front of the Acroceraunian Mountains northwest of Aulon (Vlorë), not in Amantia in the site of Ploç located south of the Aoos valley in the hinterland of Aulon. Pausanias' data have been compared with the information provided by the Apollonian commemorative monument, suggesting an "oppositional ethnicity" between the Greek colonial associations of the Bay of Aulon (i.e. the area called Abantis), and the barbarians of the hinterland. Both cities (Apollonia and Thronium) were Greek establishments.

M.V. Sakellariou states that although many scholars accept the historicity of the Euboian colonization dating some time after the colonisation of Corfu by the Eretrians, concludes that there was no direct connection between the Amantes and the Abantes but that they both came from an older Indo-European tribe which he termed Proto-Abantes, who settled in present-day Caucasus, Albania and Greece. According to S.C. Bakhuizen (1976), all scholarly constructions about a relation between the Amantes and the Euboean Abantes are fictional. Guy Smoot (2015) and Keith G.Walker (2004) proposed an opposite direction of a connection between the two tribes which he dates to the EIA (ca. 1100-850 BCE). Instead of a colonization of the Abantes from the Argolid and Euboea to Epirus, they propose that a part of the original Abantes moved south from their homeland in Epirus to central Greece, to Euboea and as far south as Argolid, as part of the Dorian migration. According to him the Amantes that remained in Epirus came to be called Amantes, following a b/m shift typical of the North Aegean. According to Sakellariou, the correlation of the ethnic names Ἄβαντες (Abantes) and Ἄμαντες (Amantes) from the ancients, based on the hypothetical shift β > μ is considered reasonably doubtful.

== Culture ==
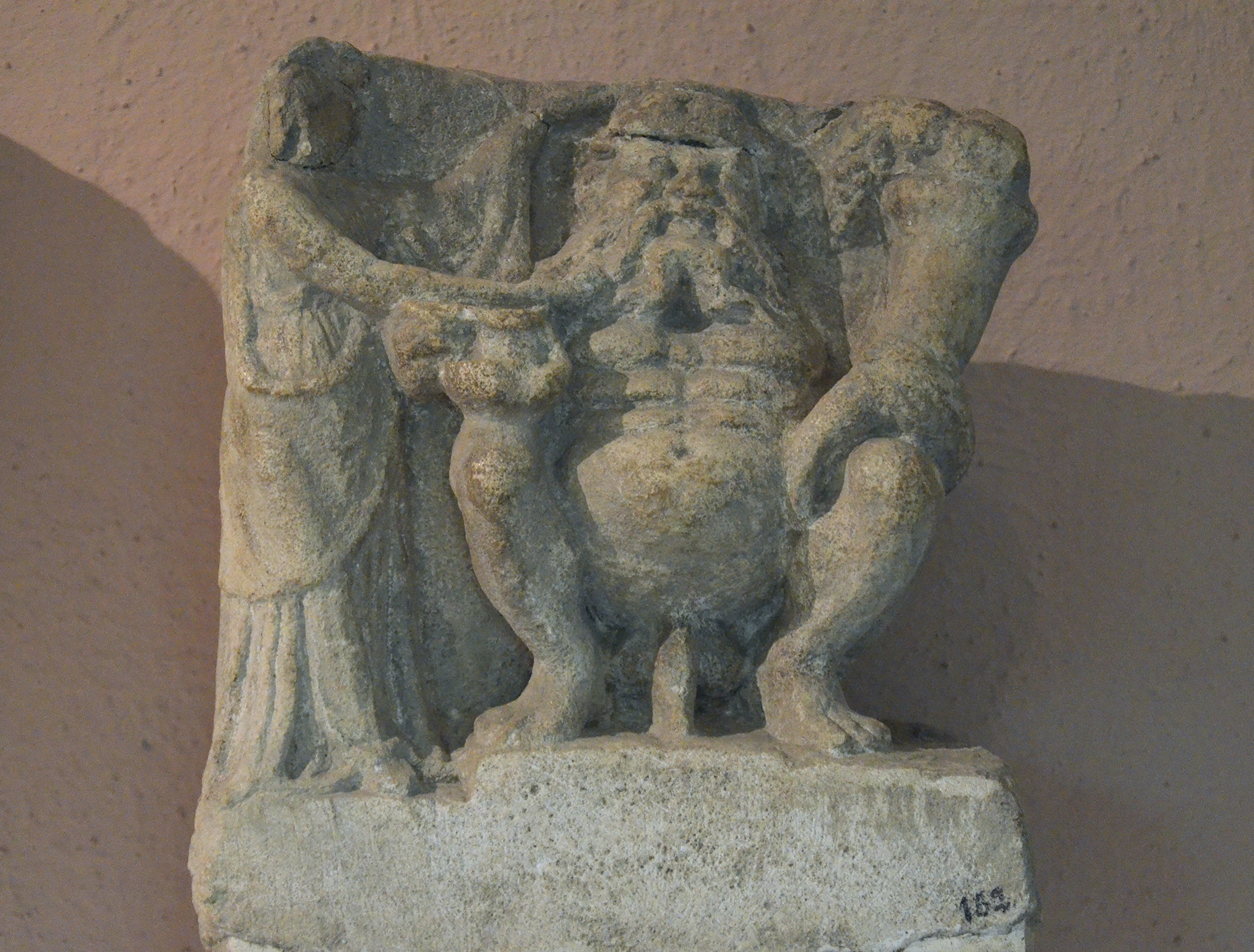
God of fertility holding a cornucopia, 3rd-2nd century BCE from Amantia, now in the Archaeological Museum of Tirana, Albania.

The culture of the region had a language that is not well known, and it seems to have not had its own writing system. In the Hellenistic period Greek influence spread from the south towards the north, involving the Amantes. In the Hellenistic era Greek inscriptions appear in Amantia, and the onomastics was mainly Greek, however there were non-Greek names in 4th century BCE inscriptions.

The local culture readily borrowed iconography and technique from the Greeks. Many cults of Amantia are typically Greek (Zeus, Aphrodite, Pandemos, Pan). Other cults like that of the male fertility deity are common of southern Illyria. It seems that the iconographies of this deity were derivations of Egyptian or Italic iconographies (Bes-Silenus), mainly from the Greek colony of Taras, which were widespread in the region from the 4th century BCE, but enriched with very stylistic innovations. In the Roman period this deity has undergone transformations mainly of Eastern influence. Some label this deity as the Illyrian god of fertility. In reality, it is futile to approach ancient cults in ethnic or national terms. The South of the Adriatic is clearly a region of religious exchanges, in which facts must be shifted, before considering them to belong to just one culture. The Illyrian-Greek cult of the nymphs was widespread in the region. An ancient sanctuary of the eternal fire called Nymphaion was placed in an area inhabited by Amantes and Bylliones, which was also located near Apollonia.

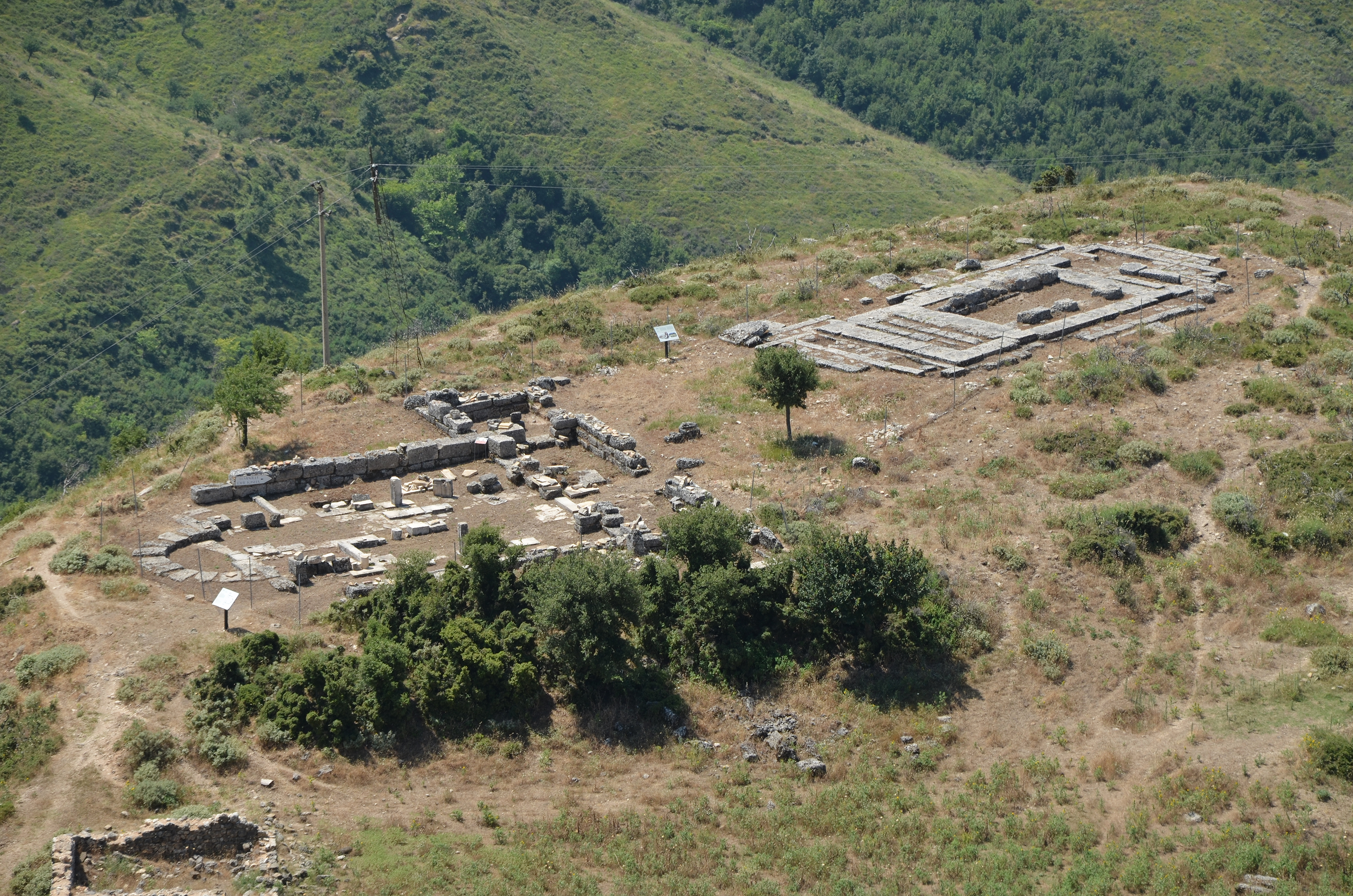
Acropolis of Amantia

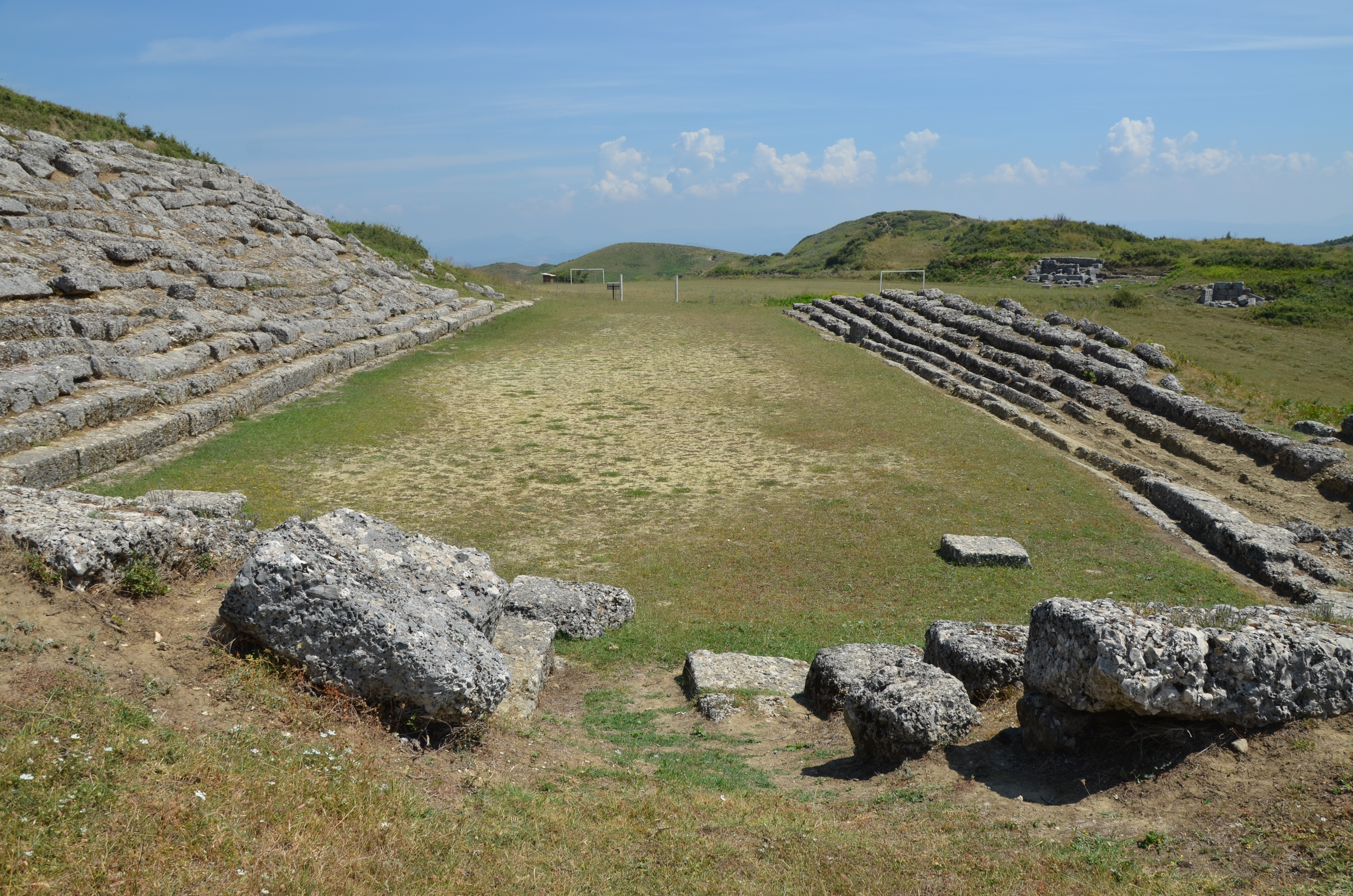
Stadium of Amantia

The stadium of Amantia shows that the koinon of the Amantes was the one on which Greek influences were strongest, no doubt because of its maritime openness and its close proximity to Apollonia. Among the Amantes substantially imbued with ancient Greek culture, the attestation of the presence of a peripolarchos and his subordinates peripoloi provides evidence for the adoption of ephebic institutions, very similar to those of central Greece, especially those of Athens. The Amantes in Amantia built a stadium and were considered as Hellenes by the inhabitants of Delphi registering them on their list of theorodokos, and inviting them to take part in the panhellenic Pythian Games, so they would have been able to adopt a system of training young people very similar to that in usage in the cities of central Greece.

Inscriptions in Latin appear after 200 AD when the region became part of the Roman sphere of influence and later the Roman Empire.

=== Hellenistic political organisation ===
In describing the Hellenistic political organisation of the Amantes, until recently scholars have hesitated to recognize the existence of a koinon of the Amantes, and they have spoken rather of Amantia as a City-State on the model of Greek colonial cities. The existence of a koinon of the Amantes (AMANTΩΝ) is strongly supported by Greek inscriptions from the 3rd-1st centuries BCE, which were recently discovered within the Illyrian tribal territory of the Amantes, in particular the inscription of Matohasanaj, which attests to the function of the figure of peripolarchos (Ancient Greek: περιπολάρχος). The role of this figure was to preside over the peripoloi to ensure the security of the state borders. Until the finding of the Matohasanaj inscription this function was known in this area only for the koinon of the Bylliones. The fortress of Matohasanaj where the inscription was found is located on the eastern border of the territory of the Amantes, in a strategic position between southern Illyria and Epirus, bordering the koinon of the Chaonians.

Through the intermediary of the Greek colonies, in particular of Apollonia the institution of the peripoloi spread in the neighboring indigenous communities, among the Balaïites, the Bylliones as well as the Amantes, providing evidence for the adoption of an ephebia similar to that of the Greeks.

According to Lippert and Matzinger (2021) Amantia was the seat of the Illyrian tribe of the Amantes, and according to them, like the other Illyrian cities, Amantia was not a Greek-style polis. The koinon of the Amantes and the koinon of the Bylliones are today considered to have been the most notable Illyrian koina, organized in a manned similar to the Koinon of the Epirotes.

The community of the Amantes seceded from the Epirote state only at the moment of the fall of the monarchy. At the time of Pyrrhus, his son Alexander II and his descendants, Epirus was still strong and controlled both southern Illyria in the north and part of Acarnania in the south. In this context it is no wonder that the bronze coins of Amantia, starting from 230 BCE, used symbols of the Epirote tradition with which the inhabitants of the city were accustomed, and only the legend on the coins was changed from ΑΠΕΙΡΩΤΑΝ (of the Epirotes) to ΑΜΑΝΤΩΝ (of the Amantes), both written in Greek letters. At the same year Amantia joined the Koinon of the Epirotes.

Taking into account archaeological and historical considerations, the city of Olympe should have been founded in the ethnic context of the Amantes, but later it was organized as a proper polis turning away from its ethnic context. The dissociation from the ethnic to the polis coincided with Philip V of Macedon's conquest of a number of cities in Illyria.

== Bibliography ==
- Anamali, Skënder (1992). "Santuari di Apollonia". In Stazio, Attilio; Ceccoli, Stefania (eds.). La Magna Grecia e i grandi santuari della madrepatria: atti del trentunesimo Convegno di studi sulla Magna Grecia. Atti del Convegno di studi sulla Magna Grecia (in Italian). Vol. 31. Istituto per la storia e l'archeologia della Magna Grecia. pp. 127–136.
- Bakhuizen, Simon (1976). Chalcis-in-Euboea: Iron and Chalcidians Abroad. Brill Archive. ISBN 9004045465.
- Bejko, Lorenc; Morris, Sarah; Papadopoulos, John; Schepartz, Lynne (2015). The Excavation of the Prehistoric Burial Tumulus at Lofkend, Albania. ISD LLC. ISBN 978-1938770524.
- Billerbeck, Margarethe (2008). Jan Felix Gaertner; Beatrice Wyss; Christian Zubler (eds.). Stephani Byzantii Ethnica. Vol. I: Α–Γ. Walter de Gruyter. ISBN 9783110202816.
- Cabanes, Pierre (2008). "Greek Colonisation in the Adriatic". In Tsetskhladze, Gocha R. (ed.). Greek Colonisation: An Account of Greek Colonies and Other Settlements Overseas. Vol. 2. Brill. pp. 155–186. ISBN 9789047442448.
- Cabanes, Pierre (2011). "Disa çështje mbi Amantët / Interrogations sur les Amantes". Iliria. 35: 75–98. doi:10.3406/iliri.2011.1100.
- Cabanes, Pierre; Jaupaj, Lavdosh; Sina, Ermal; Trushaj, Aleks; Vrekaj, Bashkim (2016). "Nouvelles inscriptions grecques en Albanie" (PDF). Revue des Études Anciennes. 118 (2). Presses Universitaires de Bordeaux: 403–411. doi:10.3406/rea.2016.6776.
- Çabej, Eqrem (1996). Studime etimologjike në fushë të shqipes. Vol. 4. Akademia e Shkencave e RPS të Shqipërisë, Instituti i Gjuhësisë dhe i Letërsisë.
- Ceka, Neritan (2009). "Atintanët: një rivështrim mbi territorin dhe historinë e tyre / Les Atintanes, un nouvel aperçu de leur territoire et de leur histoire". Iliria. 34: 5–23. doi:10.3406/iliri.2009.1078.
- Ceka, Neritan; Ceka, Olgita (2017). "A Peripolarchos inscription from the castle of Matohasanaj". In Luan Përzhita; Ilir Gjipali; Gëzim Hoxha; Belisa Muka (eds.). New archaeological discoveries in the Albanian regions: proceedings of the international conference 30 - 31 January, Tirana 2017. Vol. 1. Botimet Albanologjike. Academy for Albanian Studies, Institute of Archaeology. pp. 488–508. ISBN 978-9928-141-71-2.
- Ceka, Olgita (2012). "Il koinon e la città. L'esempio di Byllis". In G. de Marinis; G.M. FabriniG. Paci; R. Perna; M. Silvestrini (eds.). I processi formativi ed evolutividella città in area adriatica. BAR International Series. Vol. 2419. Archaeopress. pp. 59–64. ISBN 978-1-4073-1018-3.
- Chatzopoulos, M. B. (1997). "The Borders of Hellenism in Epirus during Antiquity". In M. V. Sakellariou (ed.). Ηπειρος: 4000 χρόνια ελληνικής ιστορίας και πολιτισμού. Ekdotike Athenon. ISBN 9789602133712.
- Christopoulos, George A. (1975). The Archaic Period. Pennsylvania State University Press. p. 373. ISBN 978-0-271-01199-8.
- Çipa, Kriledjan (2020). "The fortified settlement of Borshi and its role in Chaonia fortification system". In Luigi Maria Caliò; Gian Michele Gerogiannis; Maria Kopsacheili (eds.). Fortificazioni e società nel Mediterraneo occidentale: Albania e Grecia settentrionale [Fortifications and Societies in the Western Mediterranean: Albania and Northern Greece]. Quasar. ISBN 9788854910430.
- Counillon, Patrick (2006). "Le Périple du Pseudo-Scylax et l' Adriatique, 17-24". In Čače, Slobodan; Kurilić, Anamarija; Tassaux, Francis (eds.). Les routes de l'Adriatique antique: géographie et économie: actes de la table ronde du 18 au 22 septembre 2001, Zadar. Ausonius. ISBN 2910023826.
- Dominguez, Adolfo (2020). "Greeks on Both Sides: Interaction between Colonists and Local Peoples in Ancient Epirus". Colloquia Antiqua. 26: 59–91.
- Dominguez-Monedero, Adolfo J. (2014). "Eubeos y locrios entre el Jónico y el Adriático". L. Breglia, A. Moleti (Eds.) Hespería. Tradizioni, rotte, paesaggi. Tekmeria, 16. Paestum. Pandemos. 2014. P. 189-210.
- Elsie, Robert (2015). "The Early History of Albania" (PDF). Keeping an Eye on the Albanians: Selected Writings in the Field of Albanian Studies. Vol. 16. ISBN 978-1-5141-5726-8.
- Funke, Peter; Moustakis, Barbara; Hochschulz (2004). "Epeiros". In Mogens Herman Hansen; Thomas Heine Nielsen (eds.). An Inventory of Archaic and Classical Poleis. Oxford University Press. pp. 338–350. ISBN 0-19-814099-1.
- Galaty, Michael L. (2002). "Modeling the Formation and Evolution of an Illyrian Tribal System: Ethnographic and Archaeological Analogs". In William A. Parkinson (ed.). The Archaeology of Tribal Societies. Berghahn Books. ISBN 1789201713.
- Green, Peter (2007). The Argonautika: Apollonios Rhodios. Classical Literature Series. University of California Press. ISBN 9780520253933. ISSN 1054-0857.
- Haensch, Rudolf (2012). "Vorausschauender Euerget und Getreideversorgung einer Kleinstad". Tyche: Beiträge zur Alten Geschichte, Papyrologie und Epigraphik. 27.
- Hammond, N. G. L. (1989). "The Illyrian Atintani, the Epirotic Atintanes and the Roman Protectorate". The Journal of Roman Studies. 79: 11–25. doi:10.2307/301177. JSTOR 301177. S2CID 162831458.
- Jaupaj, Lavdosh (2019). Etudes des interactions culturelles en aire Illyro-épirote du VII au III siècle av. J.-C (Thesis). Université de Lyon; Instituti i Arkeologjisë (Albanie).
- Lippert, Andreas; Matzinger, Joachim (2021). Die Illyrer: Geschichte, Archäologie und Sprache. Kohlhammer Verlag. ISBN 9783170377103.
- Malkin, Irad (2001). "Greek Ambiguities: Between "Ancient Hellas" and "Barbarian Epirus"". In Malkin, Irad (ed.). Ancient Perceptions of Greek Ethnicity. Center for Hellenic Studies colloquia. Vol. 5. Center for Hellenic Studies, Trustees for Harvard University. pp. 187–212. ISBN 978-0-674-00662-1.
- Mesihović, Salmedin (2014). ΙΛΛΥΡΙΚΗ (Ilirike) (in Bosnian). Sarajevo: Filozofski fakultet u Sarajevu. ISBN 978-9958-0311-0-6.
- Papazoglou, Fanoula (1986). "Politarques en Illyrie". Historia: Zeitschrift für Alte Geschichte. 35 (4). Franz Steiner Verlag: 438–448. JSTOR 4435982.
- Picard, Olivier (2013). "Ilirët, kolonitë greke, monedhat dhe lufta". Iliria. 37: 79–97. doi:10.3406/iliri.2013.2428.
- Quantin, François; Dimo, Arjan (2011). "Nga Amantia në Apoloni: Kërkime mbi një hyjni të Ilirisë Antike / D'Amantia à Apollonia: Enquête sur une divinité dans le sud de l'Illyrie antique". Iliria (in Albanian and French). 35: 123–153. doi:10.3406/iliri.2011.1102.
- Sakellariou, M. V. (2018). Hellēnika ethnē kata tēn epochē tou chalkou [Greek people in the Bronze Age] (in Greek). Panepistēmiakes Ekdoseis Krētēs. ISBN 978-960-524-498-9.
- Šašel Kos, Marjeta (2005). Appian and Illyricum. Narodni muzej Slovenije. ISBN 961616936X.
- Shehi, Eduard (2015). Terra sigillata en Illyrie méridionale et en Chaonie: importations et productions locales (IIe S. AV. J.-C. -IIe S. AP. J.-C.). Col·lecció Instrumenta (in French). Vol. 48. Barcelona: Universitat de Barcelona, Publicacions i Edicions. ISBN 978-84-475-4238-3.
- Shipley, Graham (2019). Pseudo-Skylax's Periplous: The Circumnavigation of the Inhabited World: Text, Translation and Commentary. Oxford University Press. ISBN 978-1789620917.
- Shpuza, Saimir (2017). Dyczek, Piotr (ed.). "Scodra and the Labeates. Cities, rural fortifications and territorial defense in the Hellenistic period". Novensia. 28. Warszawa: Ośrodek Badań nad Antykiem Europy Południowo-Wschodniej: 41–64. ISBN 978-83-946222-5-1. ISSN 0860-5777.
- Shpuza, Saimir (2022). La Romanisation de l'Illyrie méridionale et de la Chaônie. Collection de l'École française de Rome. Publications de l'École française de Rome. ISBN 9782728310982.
- Smoot, Guy P. (16 May 2015). Ethnicity, Ethnogenesis and Ancestry in the Early Iron Age Aegean as Background to and through the Lens of the Iliad (Thesis). Harvard University, Graduate School of Arts & Sciences.
- Stocker, Sharon R. (2009). Illyrian Apollonia: Toward a New Ktisis and Developmental History of the Colony.
- Toynbee, Arnold J. (1969). Some Problems of Greek History. Oxford University Press. ISBN 9780192152497.
- Tzitzilis, Ch. (2007). "Greek and Illyrian". In A.-F. Christidis (ed.). A History of Ancient Greek: From the Beginnings to Late Antiquity. Cambridge University Press. pp. 745–751. ISBN 978-0521833073.
- Walker, Keith G. (2004). Archaic Eretria:A Political and Social History form the Earliest Times to 490 BC. London: Routledge. ISBN 0-203-49108-4.
- Warnecke, Heinz (2014). "Lykophron und die westgriechischeInsel Melite" (PDF). Theologia (in German). 85.
- Winnifrith, Tom (2002). Badlands, Borderlands: A History of Northern Epirus/Southern Albania. Duckworth. ISBN 978-0-7156-3201-7.
- Zindel, Christian; Lippert, Andreas; Lahi, Bashkim; Kiel, Machiel (2018). Albanien: Ein Archäologie- und Kunstführer von der Steinzeit bis ins 19. Jahrhundert (in German). Vandenhoeck & Ruprecht. ISBN 9783205200109.
