= Amantia =

Archaeological park in Albania

- Ἀμάντια, Ἀβάντια (Ancient Greek); Amantia (Latin)
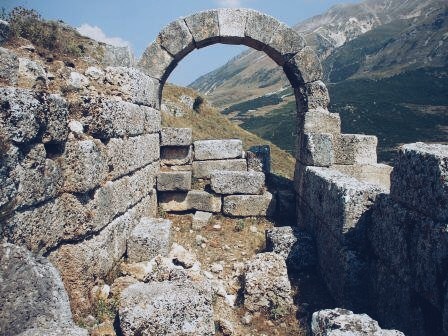
- Arched entrance in Amantia

- Location in Albania
- 40°22′44.6″N 19°41′55.8″E
- Type: Settlement
- Periods: Iron Age; Classical; Hellenistic; Roman
- Cultures: Illyrian; Greek; Roman
- Location: Ploç, Vlorë County, Albania
- Region: Illyria, Epirus

Site notes
- Owner: Government of Albania

Cultural Monument of Albania

Amantia (Ancient Greek: Ἀμάντια, Ἀβάντια; Latin: Amantia) was an ancient city and the main settlement of the Amantes, traditionally located in southern Illyria in classical antiquity. In Hellenistic times the city was either part of Illyria or Epirus. In Roman times it was included within Epirus Nova, in the province of Macedonia. The site has been identified with the village of Ploçë, Vlorë County, Albania. Amantia was designated as an archaeological park on 7 April 2003 by the government of Albania.

The massive walls of Amantia were built before the end of the 4th century BC, and literary sources report them as an Illyrian rather than Epirote or Macedonian foundation. Later Amantia acquired the trappings of a Hellenistic town. In 230 BC Amantia became part of the Koinon Epirus. Amantia received sacred ancient Greek envoys, known as theoroi, around the early 2nd century BC, which only cities that were considered Greek were eligible to receive. The time duration that passed before Illyrian cities were documented on a list of theorodokoi clarifies that acculturation did take place in southern Illyria; however, it indicates that the process was gradual.

Amantia occupied an important defensive position above the Aoos/Vjosë river valley to the east, and on the road to the coast and the Bay of Aulon. At the archaeological site of Ploçë, a temple dedicated to Aphrodite, a theatre, and a stadium have also been found.

== Etymology ==
Pseudo-Skylax (Periplus. 26) and Lycophron (Alexandra. 1043) recorded the toponym Ἀμάντια, Amantia. The Delphic list of theorodokoi reported the form Ἀβάντια, Abantia. The city-ethnic is recorded as Ἀμάντιεύς, Amantieus by Pseudo Skylax (27). The town's demonym was Amantieus (Ancient Greek: Ἀμάντιεύς).

The name Amantia and the tribal name Amantes have been connected with the Albanian term amë/ãmë ("river-bed, fountain, spring"). It has been suggested that the root morpheme *Amant- was perhaps a "barbarized" version of *Abant- in relation to the Abantes. The name Amantia is generally accepted as Illyrian. The toponym corresponds to Amantia in southern Italy which is linked to the Illyrian movements via the Adriatic (Iapygians) in antiquity. A homonymous Illyrian tribe lived in eastern Slavonia.

== History ==
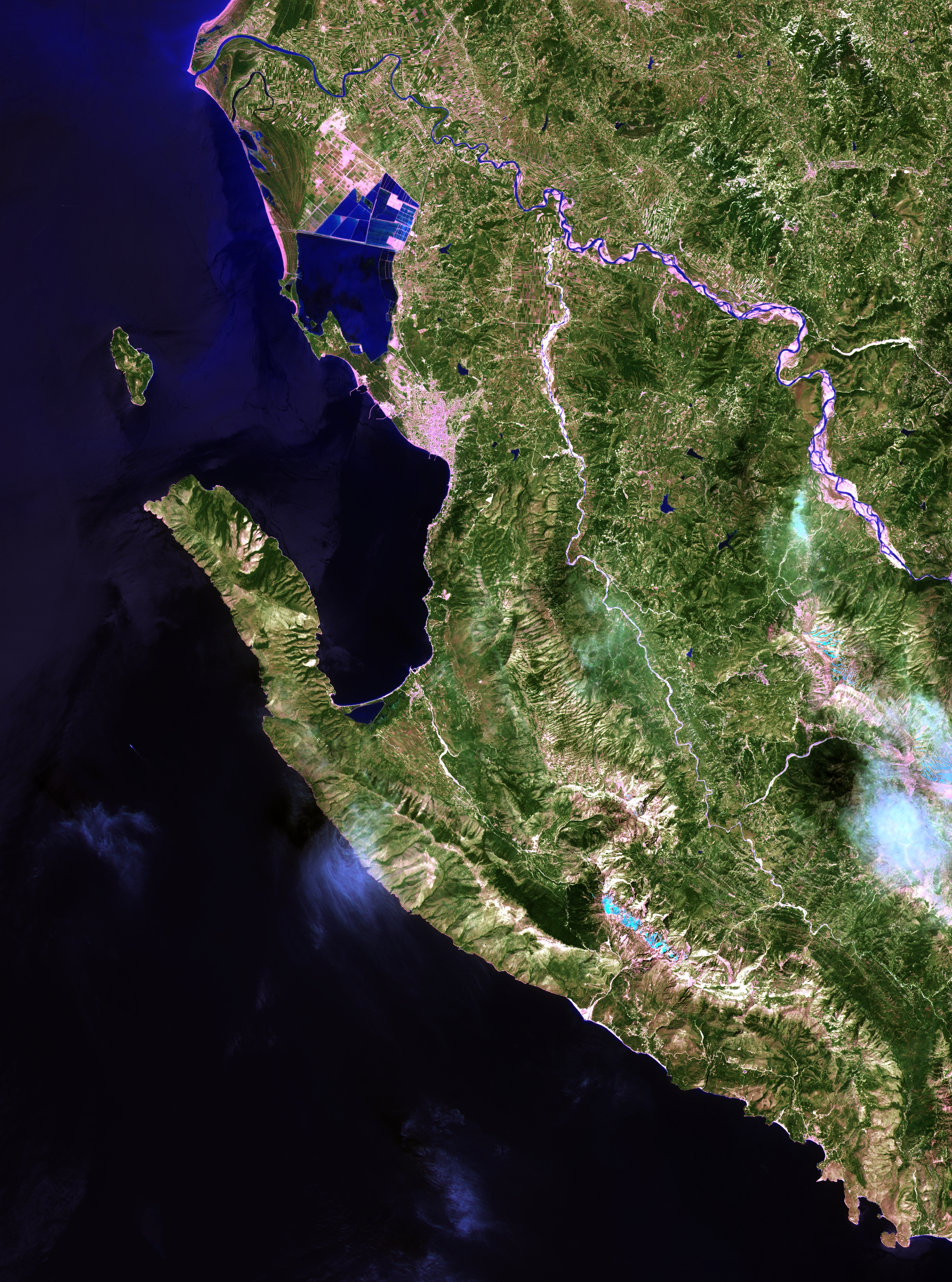

The earliest of the written sources that recorded the toponym Amantia is the Periplus of Pseudo-Skylax (4th century BC), mentioning it as a city in Illyria. By listing it as the only site between the two poleis of Apollonia and Orikos, the account of Pseudo-Skylax suggests that Amantia was somehow important. It seems that in the Periplus the toponym Amantia denotes the territory rather than the urban center of the polis. It has been suggested that in the Periplus Orikos is identified as a Greek city placed in the territory of Amantia, the latter being regarded as an Illyrian city. Lycophron's Alexandra (3rd century BC) attests Amantia as a polis in the urban sense.

A tradition reported by Pausanias (2nd century AD) alleges that the settlement was founded by Locrians from nearby Thronium and Abantes from Euboea. Stephanus Byzantius – based on Pausanias – mentions that Amantia was founded on Illyrian territory by the Euboean Abantes "returning from the Trojan war". According to another legend reported by Lycophron in his Alexandra, Elpenor – who actually died at Troy – and the Abantes from Euboea went to the island Othronos and were driven by swarms of snakes to the land of the Atintanes towards the city of Amantia. It has been suggested that the data from Pausanias is more in accordance with the settlement of the Euboean colony in Thronion in the coastal site of Triport located in front of the Acroceraunian Mountains northwest of Aulon, not in Amantia in the site of Ploç located south of the Aoos valley in the hinterland of Aulon. Pausanias' data have been compared with the information provided by an Apollonian commemorative monument, suggesting an "oppositional ethnicity" between the Greek colonial associations of the Bay of Aulon (i.e. the area called Abantis), and the barbarians of the hinterland.

Amantia was located on the territory of the Amantes, who were described as an Illyrian people in the Periplus of Pseudo-Scylax (mid. 4th century BCE), as Epirotes by Proxenos (3rd century B.C) and by Hesychius, and as barbarians by Pliny the Elder. It is situated on the slope of a high hill and had only its acropolis fortified. The massive walls of Amantia are considered of Illyrian foundation and are dated to before the end of the 4th century BC.

The city was built around 450 BC on the site of a proto-urban settlement. Already from the beginning it had a fortified acropolis that was surrounded by a 2.1 kilometres (1.3 mi) long wall, with also a lower town. The original walls made of irregularly slammed limestone were renewed in the 4th century with isodomic ashlar layers. By the 4th century or later, the indigenous site became a town very much organised on a Greek model, acquiring the trappings of a Hellenistic city. It has been suggested that in terms of fortifications, masonry and general architecture, language and religion Amantia shares the same features as the rest of the settlements of the Greek world of that time. But it has been also assumed that like other Illyrian cities Amantia, was not a polis of the Greek type. Amantia was among the main cities and tribal centres of Epirus during the Hellenistic period.

At the second half of the 4th century Amantia received sacred theoroi ambassadors from Argos, southern Greece, indicator that the locals were treated as Greek. By the 3rd century BC, the town was strengthened economically and minted its own coins. In 230 BC Amantia joined the Koinon of the Epirotes. The fact that Amantia received theoroi from Delphi during the early 2nd century BC, indicates that it was listed among the Greek cities in the area north of the Acroceraunian mountains.

In 168 BC during the 3rd Illyrian-Roman War Amantia supported the Roman side. In the middle of the 2nd century BC Amantia was found in alliance with Apollonia, most probably as part of a united pro-Roman policy against various Illyrian states. Following the Roman annexation of the region (148 BC), the city became part of the Roman province of Macedonia and then Epirus Novus. Throughout the Roman period, Amantia was a civitas libera. Amantia was among the thriving settlements of Epirus during the last two centuries B.C.

Eulalius, one of the Eastern bishops at the Council of Sardica who refused to recognize its right to revoke the condemnation of Athanasius of Alexandria and withdrew in a body to Philippopolis, was probably bishop of this town, but some think he was bishop of Amasea. During the early 4th century a basilica was erected. No longer a residential bishopric, Amantia is today listed by the Catholic Church as a titular see.

Amantia is an archaeological park of Albania, designed as such on 7 April 2003 by the government of Albania.

== Culture ==
The culture of the region had a language that is not well known, and it seems to have not had its own writing system. Amantia's urban organization occurred at a period of wider evolution among the settlements of the broader area of Epirus as a result of the previous development among Molossian cities. The first inscriptions in Amantia appear in the 4th century BC, during the Hellenistic era, and are in Greek. The onomastics are mainly Greek, with some non-Greek names. The local culture readily borrowed iconography and technique from the Greeks. Many cults of Amantia are of the typical Greek pantheon, such as Zeus, Aphrodite, Pandemos and Pan. The cult of Aphrodite probably dates from the archaic era – with Amantia being in such a case among the first settlements in the region to worship the goddess – or from the Hellenistic era along with the cult of Athena. The temple of Aphrodite in Amantia is an example of the Hellenistic influence in present-day Albania via contact with the nearby Greek colonies. The cult of Heracles has been also confirmed in the city. Apollo was also among the prominent deities worshipped in Amantia as in the nearby Corinthian colonies and surrounding settlements in today's northweestern Greece and southern Albania, but also in nearby Molossian towns.

Other cults like that of the male fertility deity are common of southern Illyria. It seems that the iconographies of this deity were derivations of Egyptian or Italic iconographies (Bes-Silenus), mainly from the Greek colony of Taras, which were widespread in the region from the 4th century BC, but enriched with very stylistic innovations. In the Roman period this deity has undergone transformations mainly of Eastern influence. Some label this deity as the Illyrian god of fertility. In reality, it is futile to approach ancient cults in ethnic or national terms. The South of the Adriatic is clearly a region of religious exchanges, in which facts must be shifted, before considering them to belong to just one culture. The Illyrian-Greek cult of the nymphs was widespread in the region as well as in Amantia. An ancient sanctuary of the eternal fire called Nymphaion was located in an area near Amantia and the Amantes. Amantia's prosperity during the Hellenistic era could explain the bilingualism of the settlement in that period.

On the basis of language, institutions, officials, onomastics, city-planning and fortifications it has been described as a Greek city by historians N.G.L. Hammond (1989), Šašel Kos (1986), Hatzopoulos (1997), Rudolf Haensch (2012), and as a Greek city in southern Illyria, in the territory of the Illyrian tribe of Amantes by Fanula Papazoglou (1986). It has been described as a Hellenized Illyrian city-state by Eckstein (2008), and Lasagni (2019), and as an Illyrian city by Olgita Ceka (2012), and Jaupaj (2019). Winnifrith considered the massive walls of Amantia as of Illyrian rather than Epirote or Macedonian foundation, and that the site later acquired the trappings of a Hellenistic city. Mesihović (2014) has described Amantia as an Illyrian city built and governed according to the Greek model. Papadopoulos (2016) described it as an indigenous site that by the 4th century BC or later developed into a city very much organised on a Greek model. According to Lippert and Matzinger (2021), like other Illyrian cities, Amantia was not a polis of the Greek type.

In the Roman era, the use of Greek by the Romans to address the natives was seen not only as a gesture of good will, but also as an effort to promote rapprochement between those communities. A 2nd century AD bilingual inscription in Greek and Latin dating back to Imperial times is found above the fountain of Ploça village. It shows that the establishment of the Roman province of Macedonia in 148 BC led to the installation of Latin-speaking populations as far as Amantia. The bilingual inscription can also testify that in the ancient site of Ploça there was a Latin enclave and that the city prospered around 200 AD; it could also be the nature of the text that required the use of both languages.

=== Coinage ===
The numismatic material unearthed at Amantia shows that the more numerous coins were of republican Epirote origin, followed by coins with the local legend, which were fewer in number. The territorial proximity to the koinon of the Epirotes explains the predominant role of the coins of this neighbouring state. The symbols that appear on the bronze coins of Amantia are Zeus / thunderbolt, Dione / trident, and Artemis / spearhead, which were taken from Epirus. The community of the Amantes seceded from the Epirote state only at the moment of the fall of the monarchy. At the time of Pyrrhus, his son Alexander II and his descendants, Greater Epirus was still strong and controlled both southern Illyria in the north and part of Acarnania in the south. In this context it is no wonder that the bronze coins of Amantia, starting from 230 BC, used symbols of the Epirote tradition with which the inhabitants of the city were accustomed, and only the legend on the coins was changed from ΑΠΕΙΡΩΤΑΝ (of the Epirotes) to ΑΜΑΝΤΩΝ (of the Amantes), both written in Greek letters.

== Institutions ==
The organisation of Amantia is quite similar to that of a polis rather than of a federal state. The local official titles and institutions display typical names of a Greek settlement of that time, such as: prytanis (Greek: πρύτανις, "the one that presides"), grammateus (Greek: γραμματεύς, "secretary"), toxarchis, agonothetes and the boule.

The town was surrounded with a walled enclosure roughly 2,100 metres (6,900 ft) long. A large fort was built with two gates and two defensive towers in the north.

== Gallery ==
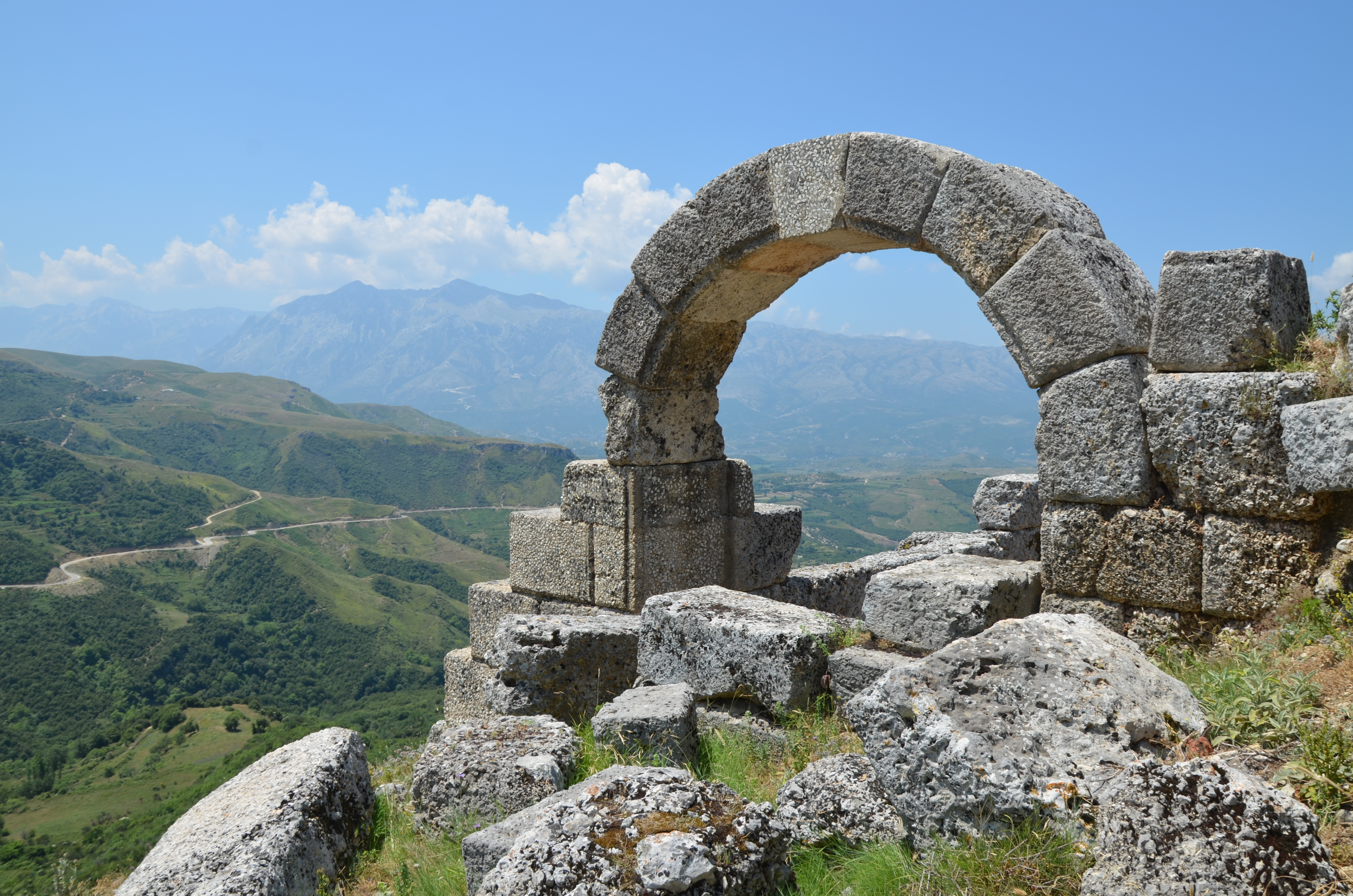
Gate

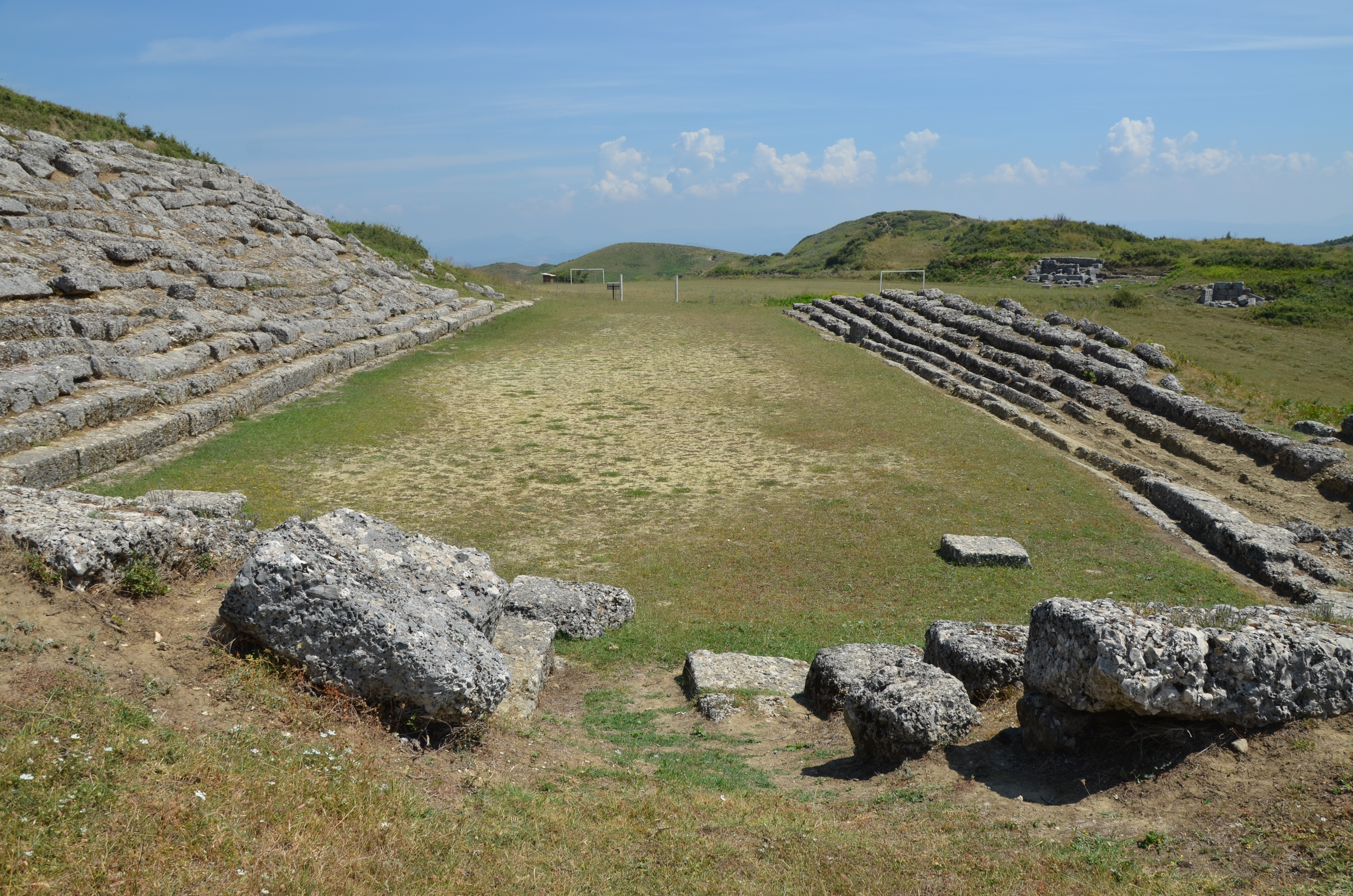
Stadium

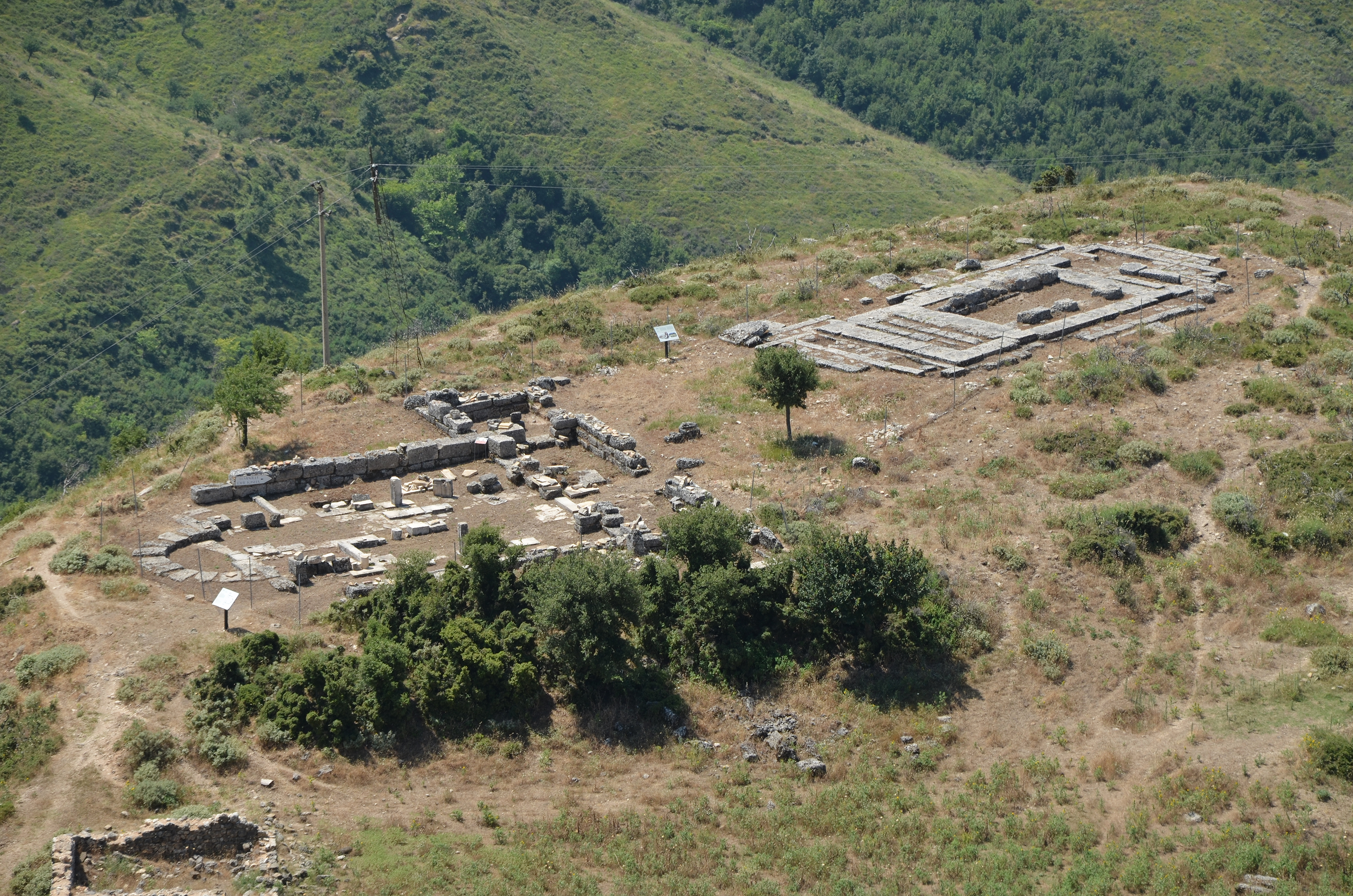
Basilica

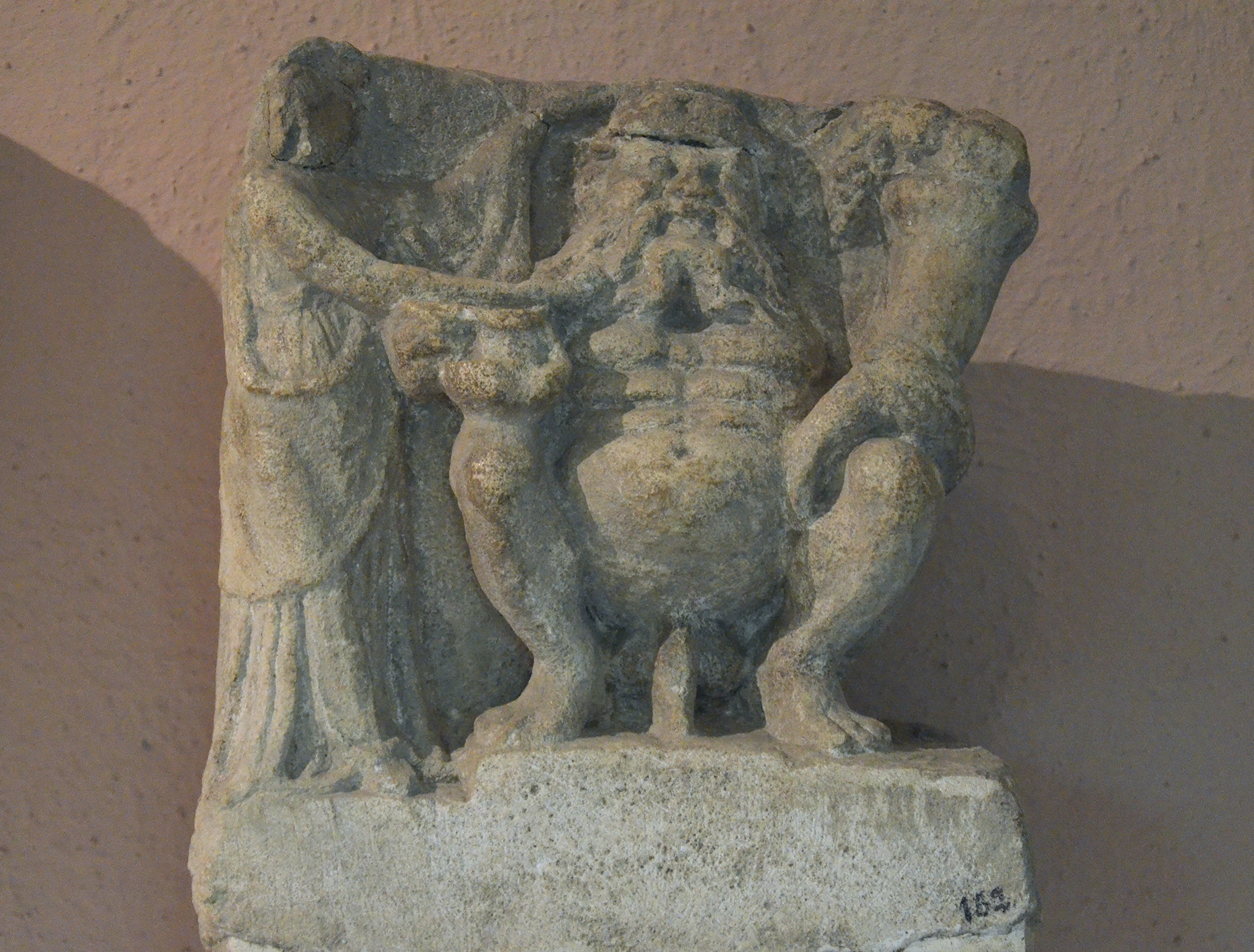
Sculpture of the fertility deity

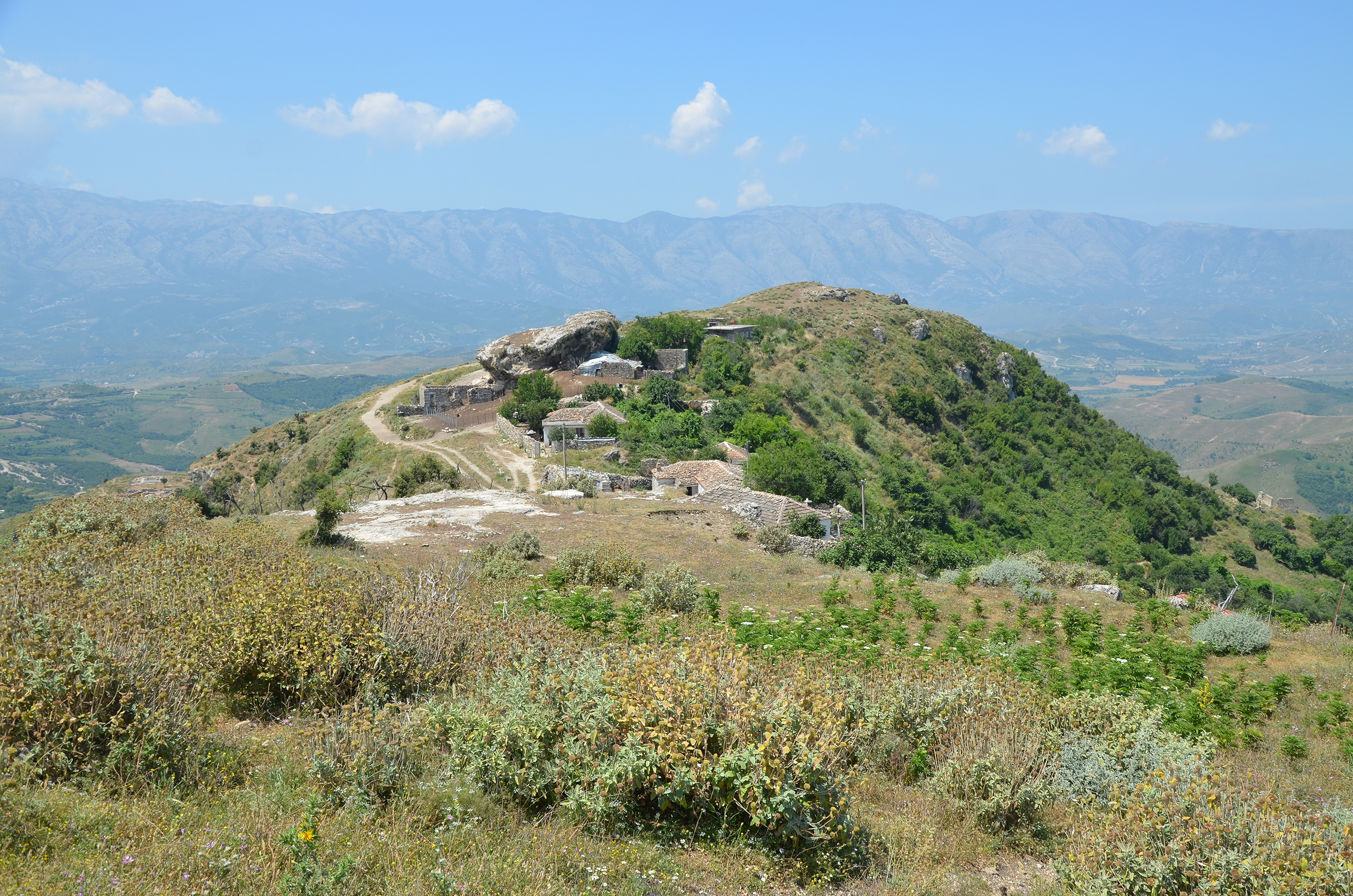
Acropolis

== See also ==
- List of settlements in Illyria
- Tourism in Albania
- Amantes
- Abantes

== Bibliography ==
- Anamali, Skënder (1972). "Amantia". Iliria. 2: 61–133. doi:10.3406/iliri.1972.1142.
- Anamali, Skënder (1992). "Santuari di Apollonia". In Stazio, Attilio; Ceccoli, Stefania (eds.). La Magna Grecia e i grandi santuari della madrepatria: atti del trentunesimo Convegno di studi sulla Magna Grecia. Atti del Convegno di studi sulla Magna Grecia (in Italian). Vol. 31. Istituto per la storia e l'archeologia della Magna Grecia. pp. 127–136.
- Baldi, Philip (1983). An Introduction to the Indo-European Languages. SIU Press. ISBN 978-0-8093-1091-3.
- Bejko, Lorenc; Morris, Sarah; Papadopoulos, John; Schepartz, Lynne (2015). The Excavation of the Prehistoric Burial Tumulus at Lofkend, Albania. ISD LLC. ISBN 978-1-938770-52-4.
- Bol, Renate; Höckmann, Ursula; Schollmeyer, Patrick (2008). Kult(ur)kontakte: Apollon in Milet/Didyma, Histria, Myus, Naukratis und auf Zypern: Akten der Table Ronde in Mainz vom 11.-12. März 2004 (in German). VML, Verlag Marie Leidorf. p. 50. ISBN 978-3-89646-441-5.
- Cabanes, Pierre (2008). "Greek Colonisation in the Adriatic". In Tsetskhladze, Gocha R. (ed.). Greek Colonisation: An Account of Greek Colonies and Other Settlements Overseas. Vol. 2. Brill. pp. 155–186. ISBN 978-90-474-4244-8.
- Cabanes, Pierre (2011). "Disa çështje mbi Amantët / Interrogations sur les Amantes". Iliria. 35: 75–98. doi:10.3406/iliri.2011.1100.
- Çabej, Eqrem (1996). Studime etimologjike në fushë të shqipes. Vol. 4. Akademia e Shkencave e RPS të Shqipërisë, Instituti i Gjuhësisë dhe i Letërsisë.
- Castiglioni, Maria Paola (2003). "Il monumento degli Apolloniati a Olimpia". Mélanges de l'École française de Rome: Antiquité. 115 (2): 867–880. doi:10.3406/mefr.2003.9796.
- Ceka, Olgita (2012). "Il koinon e la città. L'esempio di Byllis". In G. de Marinis; G.M. FabriniG. Paci; R. Perna; M. Silvestrini (eds.). I processi formativi ed evolutividella città in area adriatica. BAR International Series. Vol. 2419. Archaeopress. pp. 59–64. ISBN 978-1-4073-1018-3.
- Ceka, Neritan; Ceka, Olgita (2017). "A Peripolarchos inscription from the castle of Matohasanaj". In Luan Përzhita; Ilir Gjipali; Gëzim Hoxha; Belisa Muka (eds.). New archaeological discoveries in the Albanian regions: proceedings of the international conference 30 - 31 January, Tirana 2017. Vol. 1. Botimet Albanologjike. Academy for Albanian Studies, Institute of Archaeology. pp. 488–508. ISBN 978-9928-141-71-2.
- Dieterle, Martina (2007). Dodona: religionsgeschichtliche und historische Untersuchungen zur Entstehung und Entwicklung des Zeus-Heiligtums (in German). G.Olms. ISBN 978-3-487-13510-6.
- Dmitriev, Sviatoslav (2005). City Government in Hellenistic and Roman Asia Minor. Oxford University Press. p. 147. ISBN 978-0-19-534690-9.
- Funke, Peter; Moustakis, Barbara; Hochschulz (2004). "Epeiros". In Mogens Herman Hansen; Thomas Heine Nielsen (eds.). An Inventory of Archaic and Classical Poleis. Oxford University Press. pp. 338–350. ISBN 0-19-814099-1.
- Haensch, Rudolf (2012). "Vorausschauender Euerget und Getreideversorgung einer Kleinstad". Tyche: Beiträge zur Alten Geschichte, Papyrologie und Epigraphik. 27.
- Hammond, N. G. L. (1992). "The Relations of Illyrian Albania with the Greeks and the Romans". In Winnifrith, Tom (ed.). Perspectives on Albania. Springer. p. 37. ISBN 978-1-349-22050-2.
- Hatzopoulos, M. B. (1997). "The Borders of Hellenism in Epirus during Antiquity". In M. V. Sakellariou (ed.). Ηπειρος: 4000 χρόνια ελληνικής ιστορίας και πολιτισμού. Ekdotike Athenon. ISBN 978-960-213-371-2.
- Hernandez, David; Hodges, Richard (2020). Beyond Butrint: Dominion, Territory, Environment and the Corrupting Sea. doi:10.2307/j.ctv13pk71h.29. JSTOR j.ctv13pk71h.
- Hernandez, David R. (2017). "Bouthrotos (Butrint) in the Archaic and Classical Periods: The Acropolis and Temple of Athena Polias". Hesperia: The Journal of the American School of Classical Studies at Athens. 86 (2): 205–271. doi:10.2972/hesperia.86.2.0205. ISSN 0018-098X. JSTOR 10.2972/hesperia.86.2.0205. S2CID 164963550.
- Hoti, Afrim (2022). "Dyrrhachium bizantina e il suo territorio (VI-VIII sec.)". In Sonia Antonelli; Vasco La Salvia; Maria Cristina Mancini; Oliva Menozzi; Marco Moderato; Maria Carla Somma (eds.). Archaeologiae Una storia al plural: Studi in memoria di Sara Santoro. Archaeopress Publishing. pp. 245–250. ISBN 978-1-80327-297-9.
- Jaupaj, Lavdosh (2019). Etudes des interactions culturelles en aire Illyro-épirote du VII au III siècle av. J.-C (Thesis). Université de Lyon; Instituti i Arkeologjisë (Albanie).
- Kunstmann, Heinrich (2019). Slaven und Prußen an Ostsee, Weichsel und Memel: Über ihre Herkunft vom Balkan und aus Kleinasien (in German). BoD – Books on Demand. ISBN 978-3-7460-6327-0.
- Lasagni, Chiara (2019). Cresci Marrone, Giovannella; Culasso Gastaldi, Enrica (eds.). Le realtà locali nel mondo greco: Ricerche su poleis ed ethne della Grecia occidentale. Studi e testi di epigrafia. Edizioni dell'Orso. ISBN 978-88-6274-962-6.
- Malkin, Irad (1998). The Return of Odysseus: Colonization and Ethnicity. Berkeley: University of California Press.
- Malkin, Irad (2001). "Greek Ambiguities: Between "Ancient Hellas" and "Barbarian Epirus"". In Malkin, Irad (ed.). Ancient Perceptions of Greek Ethnicity. Center for Hellenic Studies colloquia. Vol. 5. Center for Hellenic Studies, Trustees for Harvard University. pp. 187–212. ISBN 978-0-674-00662-1.
- Lippert, Andreas; Matzinger, Joachim (2021). Die Illyrer: Geschichte, Archäologie und Sprache. Kohlhammer Verlag. ISBN 978-3-17-037710-3.
- Mesihović, Salmedin (2014). ΙΛΛΥΡΙΚΗ (Ilirike) (in Bosnian). Sarajevo: Filozofski fakultet u Sarajevu. ISBN 978-9958-0311-0-6.
- Papadopoulos, John (2016). "Komai, Colonies and Cities in Epirus and Southern Albania: The Failure of the Polis and the Rise of Urbanism on the Fringes of the Greek World". In Molloy, Barry P.C. (ed.). Of Odysseys and Oddities: Scales and Modes of Interaction Between Prehistoric Aegean Societies and their Neighbours. Oxbow Books. pp. 435–460. ISBN 978-1-78570-232-7.
- Papazoglou, Fanoula (1986). "Politarques en Illyrie". Historia: Zeitschrift für Alte Geschichte. 35 (4). Franz Steiner Verlag: 438–448. JSTOR 4435982.
- Pojani, Iris (1999). "Dy relieve Apoloniate me temë divine" [Two Reliefs from Apolonia]. Iliria. 29: 243–258. doi:10.3406/iliri.1999.1715.
- Quantin, François; Dimo, Arjan (2011). "Nga Amantia në Apoloni: Kërkime mbi një hyjni të Ilirisë Antike / D'Amantia à Apollonia: Enquête sur une divinité dans le sud de l'Illyrie antique". Iliria (in Albanian and French). 35: 123–153. doi:10.3406/iliri.2011.1102.
- Shipley, Graham, ed. (2019). Pseudo-Skylax's Periplous: The Circumnavigation of the Inhabited World: Text, Translation and Commentary (2 ed.). Oxford University Press. ISBN 978-1-78962-497-7.
- Shpuza, Saimir (2014). "Colonia Iulia Augusta Dyrrachinorum". Mélanges de l'École française de Rome: Antiquité. 126 (2). doi:10.4000/mefra.2558.
- Stocker, Sharon R. (2009). Illyrian Apollonia: Toward a New Ktisis and Developmental History of the Colony.
- Winnifrith, Tom J. (2002). Badlands-borderlands: a history of Northern Epirus/Southern Albania. London: Duckworth. ISBN 0-7156-3201-9.
- Wilson, Nigel Guy (2006). Encyclopedia of Ancient Greece. Psychology Press. p. 266. ISBN 978-0-415-97334-2.
- Zindel, Christian; Lippert, Andreas; Lahi, Bashkim; Kiel, Machiel (2018). Albanien: Ein Archäologie- und Kunstführer von der Steinzeit bis ins 19. Jahrhundert (in German). Vandenhoeck & Ruprecht. ISBN 978-3-205-20010-9.
