= Olympe =

Ancient city in present-day Albania

Coordinates: 40°24′32″N 19°35′28″E

- Ολύμπη; Olimp
- Location in Albania
- Type: Settlement
- Periods: Iron Age; Classical; Hellenistic; Roman
- Cultures: Illyrian; Greek; Roman
- Location: Mavrovë, Vlorë County, Albania
- Region: Epirus or Illyria

Site notes
- Owner: Government of Albania

Olympe (Ancient Greek: Ολύμπη) (Albanian: Olimpi) was an ancient city located in the territory of the Amantes, between northern Epirus and southern Illyria in classical antiquity. It is located in modern day Mavrovë, Vlorë County, Albania.

== History ==
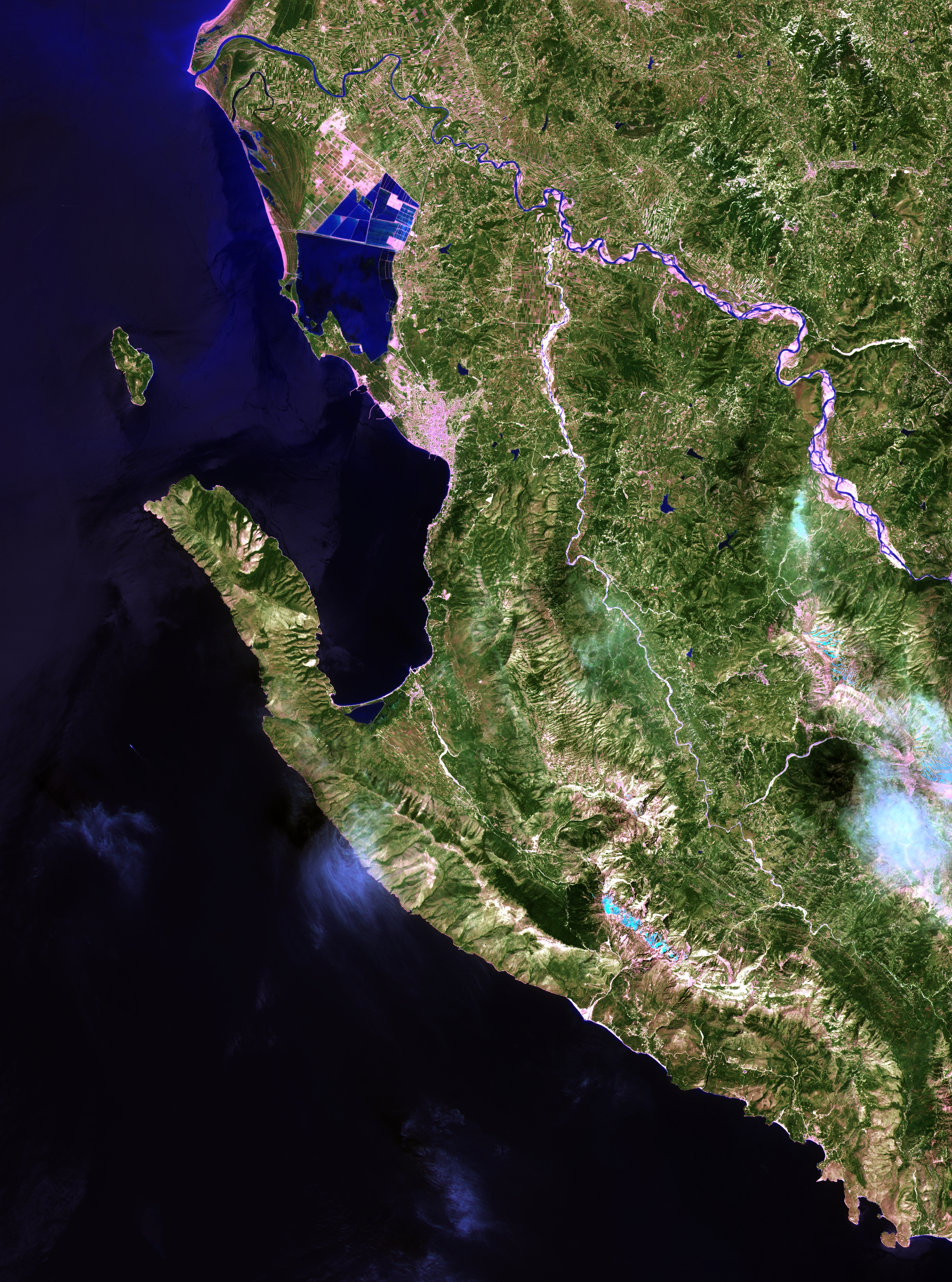

The settlement at Olympe was fortified between the late 5th century BC and the early 4th century BC.

Taking into account archaeological and historical considerations, the city of Olympe should have been founded in the ethnic context of the Amantes, but later it was organized as a proper polis turning away from its ethnic context. The dissociation from the ethnic to the polis coincided with Philip V of Macedon's conquest of a number of cities in Illyria.

In the Hellenistic period there is evidence for the polis status of Olympe, and Stephanus of Byzantium (fl. 6th century AD) recorded Olympe as a "polis of Illyria" (πόλις Ίλλυρίας). During the 3rd and 2nd centuries BC Olympe minted bronze coins bearing the inscription ΟΛΥΜΠΑΣΤΑΝ (OLYMPASTAN), and the city-ethnic was probably ’Ολυμπαστάς (Olympastas). The coins of Olympe depict a snake, the totemistic symbol among Illyrians. The same symbol is depicted in ancient Scodra, Byllis, Amantia and other major settlements. A late 3rd century BC dedication to Zeus Megistos mentions a politarches, a grammateus and the synarchontes.

== See also ==
- List of settlements in Illyria
- List of cities in ancient Epirus

== Sources ==
- Cabanes, Pierre (2011). "Disa çështje mbi Amantët / Interrogations sur les Amantes". Iliria. 35: 75–98. doi:10.3406/iliri.2011.1100.
- Castiglioni, Maria Paola (2006). "Cadmos-serpent chez les Illyriens". Hypotheses. 1 (9). doi:10.3917/hyp.051.0241.
- Hansen, Mogens Herman; Nielsen, Thomas Heine (2004). An Inventory of Archaic and Classical Poleis. Oxford and New York: Oxford University Press. ISBN 0198140991.
- Shpuza, Saimir (2017). Dyczek, Piotr (ed.). "Scodra and the Labeates. Cities, rural fortifications and territorial defense in the Hellenistic period". Novensia. 28. Warszawa: Ośrodek Badań nad Antykiem Europy Południowo-Wschodniej: 41–64. ISBN 978-83-946222-5-1. ISSN 0860-5777.
