= Kaninë =

- Village
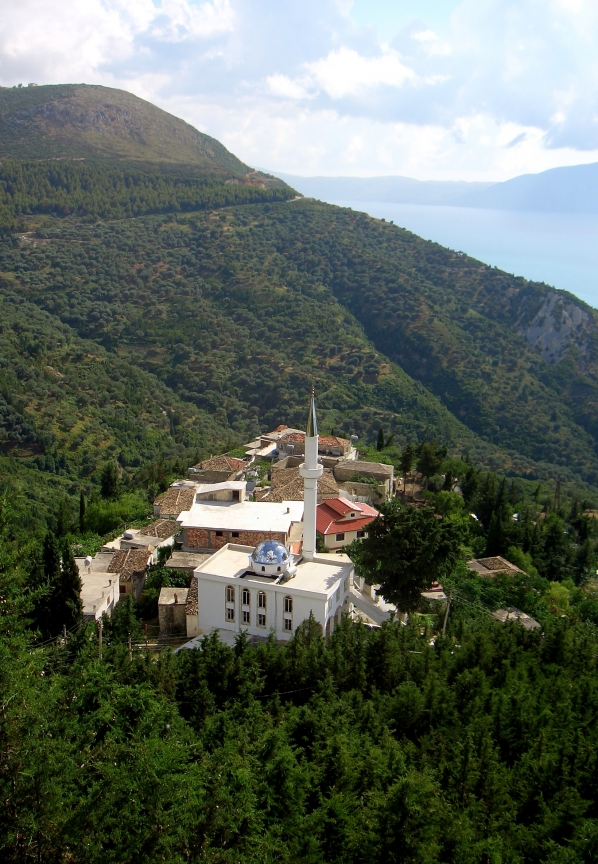
- The mosque of Kaninë from above

- Location within Albania
- Coordinates: 40°26′23″N 19°31′8″E
- Country: Albania
- County: Vlorë
- Municipality: Vlorë
- Administrative unit: Qendër Vlorë
- Time zone: UTC+1 (CET)
  - Summer (DST): UTC+2 (CEST)

Kaninë is a settlement in the Vlorë County, southwestern Albania. At the 2015 local government reform it became part of the municipality Vlorë. It is home to the Kaninë Castle.

== Name ==
According to one theory, a fort which Procopius identifies as Kionin in Epirus Vetus may be a reference to Kanina. The other view holds that the name of the fortified settlement of Kanina was attested for the first time at the beginning of the 11th century AD in Byzantine Greek as τὰ Κάνινα (in plural form). Bardhyl Demiraj argues that the toponym is significant for the history of the Albanian language since Kanina represents a toponym that shows no sign of the dialect phenomenon of rhotacism, which is explained by him with the fact that the settlement was recorded with the name Kanina in a period during which rhotacism in Albanian was no longer active for some time. On the other hand, the name of nearby Vlorë, attested earlier, was subject to the Albanian rhotacism.

== History ==
The settlement of Kaninë developed below a hilltop Kaninë Castle which overlooks the village. The first phase of the fort dates to the late 4th/early 3rd century BCE and is linked to the development of fortified sites in the region by Illyrian tribes. Kaninë provided the main route of the Amantes to the sea. The site of Kaninë has been proposed as a possible location for the unidentified ancient site of Thronium, alternatively the site of Triport has been proposed as a possible location for Thronium. The stratigraphy of the site strongly indicate that the remains of the walls of the first phase were used for its rebuilding in late antiquity. Archaeological data coincide with the rebuilding efforts by Justinian in the 6th century CE. One of the forts which Procopius identifies as Kionin in Epirus Vetus may be a reference to Kanina.

In the early Middle Ages, the site seems to have been abandoned and very little activity is archaeologically visible in its vicinity. Kanina and Vlora likely saw a revitalization by the 11th century. In this era, the rebuilt and expanded fortress of Kanina must have acquired an "increasingly defensive and administrative character" in the region. In the Song of Roland Kanina (Canelius), together with nearby Butrint (Butentrot) and Orikum (Jericho), plays an important role in the fight against the invading Normans in 1081. In the 11th–12th centuries, Kanina along with Jericho (Oricum) and Aulon formed a Byzantine province. As the Provincia Jericho et Caninon, it appears in the imperial chrysobull granted to Venice in 1198 by Alexios III Angelos. In the 13th century it was part of the Despotate of Epirus, until Michael II Komnenos Doukas gave it as dowry to his daughter Helena Angelina Doukaina when she married King Manfred of Sicily in 1258. In the decade of 1280 Kanina was contested between the Byzantine Empire and the Angevins. The contemporary poet Manuel Philis in his works recalls the campaign of protostrator Michael Glabas Tarchaneiotis. It remained part of the Kingdom of Sicily thereafter, along with Aulon, until at least the 1330s. In 1345, the Serbian King Stefan Dušan occupied the area until 1372, when it became part of the lands controlled by Balsha II. In 1417 it was conquered by the Ottoman Empire, after which the importance of Kanina gradually fell, helped also by the construction of the castle of Vlora in 1537. In the early 16th century Kanina had 514 civilian households, all of which were Christian. In the late 17th century Evliya Çelebi described Kanina (Qanye) as having a garrison of 400 soldiers and a citadel. According to him, 320 stone houses were within the walls, while 300 houses were located outside. There Sinan Pasha, a major landowner, had built a large mosque, then a well-known tekke of the Bektashi order, and a palace. The castle was later visited by other notable figures, such as William Leake, Johann Georg von Hahn, Carl Patsch, Milan Šufflay, and N.G.L. Hammond. The buildings mentioned by Çelebi have left no traces, while the castle itself still exists.

== Notable people ==
- Donika Kastrioti, Albanian noblewoman and Lady of Albania, wife of Albanian national hero Skanderbeg
- Ismail Qemali, diplomat, politician, statesman and Founding Father of Albania
- Zihni Kanina, prominent Albanian diplomat and politician

== See also ==
- Spinarica

== Sources ==
- Çipa, Kriledjan (2020). "The fortified settlement of Borshi and its role in Chaonia fortification system". In Luigi Maria Caliò; Gian Michele Gerogiannis; Maria Kopsacheili (eds.). Fortificazioni e società nel Mediterraneo occidentale: Albania e Grecia settentrionale [Fortifications and Societies in the Western Mediterranean: Albania and Northern Greece]. Quasar. ISBN 9788854910430.
- Demiraj, Bardhyl (2010). "Gli insediamenti degli albanesi nell'alto medioevo" (PDF). In Gianni Belluscio; Antonino Mendicino (eds.). Scritti in onore di Eric Pratt Hamp per il suo 90 compleanno. Rende: Università della Calabria. pp. 73–83.
- Komata, Damian (1974). "La forteresse de Kaninë". Iliria. 9–10 (9–10).
- Molla, Nevila (2017). "The survival and revival of urban settlements in the southern Adriatic: Aulon and Kanina in the early to late Middle Ages". In Moreland, John; Mitchell, John; Bea, Leal (eds.). The survival and revival of urban settlements in the southern Adriatic: Aulon and Kanina in the early to late Middle Ages. Archaeopress. ISBN 178491682X.
- Puto, Arben (2012). Pavarësia Shqiptare dhe Diplomacia e Fuqive të Mëdha : 1912-1914 (in Albanian) (Botim i ripunuar ed.). Tiranë: Botimet Toena. p. 545. ISBN 978-99943-1-826-1.
- Zakythinos, Dionysios (1941). "Μελέται περὶ τῆς διοικητικῆς διαιρέσεως καὶ τῆς ἐπαρχιακῆς διοικήσεως ἐν τῷ Βυζαντινῷ κράτει" [Studies on the administrative division and provincial administration in the Byzantine state]. Ἐπετηρίς Ἐταιρείας Βυζαντινῶν Σπουδῶν (in Greek). 17: 208–274. hdl:11615/19494.
- Zindel, Christian; Lippert, Andreas; Lahi, Bashkim; Kiel, Machiel (2018). Albanien: Ein Archäologie- und Kunstführer von der Steinzeit bis ins 19. Jahrhundert (in German). Vandenhoeck & Ruprecht. ISBN 9783205200109.
