= Triport, Vlorë =

Coordinates: 40°30′05″N 19°24′43″E

Triport
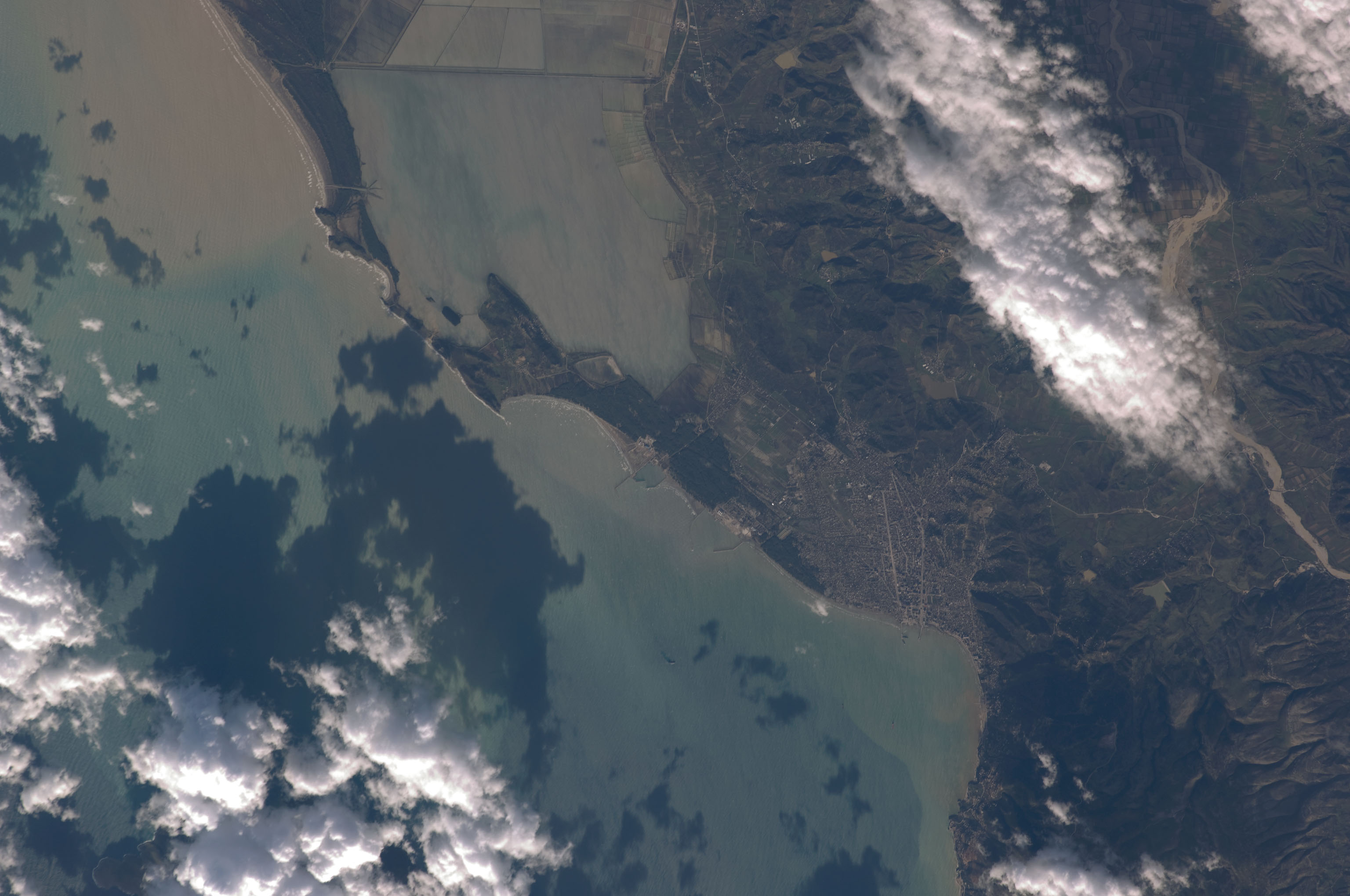
- Triport cape and harbor to the northwest of Vlorë city
- Interactive map of Triport
- Location: Vlorë, Albania

Cultural Monument of Albania

Triport or Treport is a cape and historic harbor on the Adriatic Sea northwest of Vlorë, Albania. It is located in Vlorë municipality, and constitutes the northern limit of the Bay of Vlorë. Located 5 km northwest of the city, the harbor of Triport is the Fishing Port of Vlorë. It is one of the most important fishing ports of Albania, featuring the country's second largest fishing fleet.

Triport features a rocky bend, now completely submerged, but which is more than 300 m long and between 10 and 20 m wide, creating a natural harbor which has historically been used as a safe harbour. The archaic and classical Thronion and the ancient Aulon have been identified with the site of Triport. The old stronghold of Jengjeç was located in Triport, but around the mid-16th century the stones of its ruins were brought to the site of present-day Vlorë and used to build the Skelë Castle, the new castle of Vlorë.

Archeological remains are found partially on the Triport cape and partially submerged in the waters and sands surrounding the cape. The Castle of Triport and the underwater ancient walls are designated as a Cultural Monument of Albania.

== History ==
=== Ancient period ===
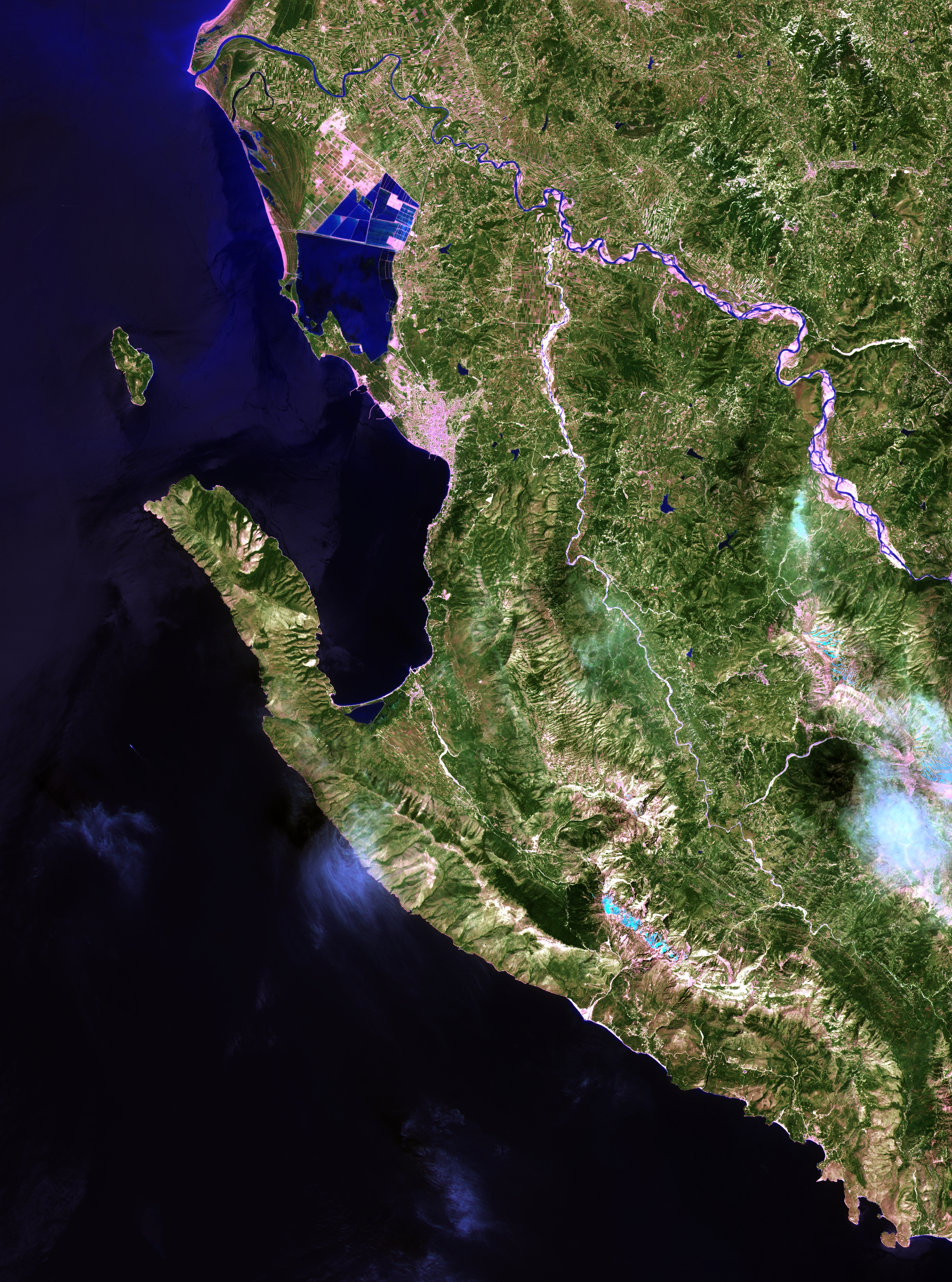

The area was one of those coastal Illyrian sites that had experienced pre-urban activity beginning from the 11th–10th centuries BCE. British scholar N. G. L. Hammond, who visited southern Albania before World War II, reported the discovery of two Mycenaean ceramic sherds from the unenclosed settlement at Triport, however he did not provide any illustration. On this settlement excavations were carried out from the late 1970s, but no other Mycenaean pottery was reported.

The area is traditionally assumed to have been colonized by Ancient Greeks. A large fortified port-town has been found in Triport, which was inhabited from the 6th century BCE to the 2nd century AD. It was delimited by three walls, the first of which dating back to the late 6th century BCE. Triport was likely one of the largest cities and ports in Illyria between the 3rd and 2nd centuries BC. The port activity in this site lasted from at least the archaic period to the medieval period. It has been suggested that a transfer of the ancient city from the site of Triport to the site of modern Vlorë occurred. The center of the modern city features walls dating from the 4th to the 10th centuries CE, as well as a wall, a quadrangular tower and ruins of a huse with ceramics dating back to the 3rd–4th centuries and to the 6th-7th centuries CE.

The archaeological site of Triport has been identified with ancient Thronion or Aulon. Thronion was attested by Pausanias (2nd century CE) as a Locrian–Euboean colony, but also by a dedication on a monument erected in Olympia, both accounts reporting that Apollonia conquered the city around 450 BCE. Aulon, from which Vlorë took its name, was mentioned for the first time by Ptolemy (2nd century CE) among the towns of the Illyrian Taulantii. Carl Patsch proposed the first location of Aulon in Treport being then transferred to the current location of Vlora, and Pierre Cabanes proposed the location of Thronion in Treport; those identifications are not in contradiction with each other. Triport can be considered to have been outside, but on the border, of the territory of the Amantes, who were found in the hinterland of the Bay of Vlorë.

The ancient port-town at Triport was apparently organized with an upper residential area, corresponding to the current hilly promontory, and with a lower area with commercial functions, where the port sector was probably located. Also the port likely featured a defense system. Recent underwater archaeological surveys have led to the identification of two massive walls of similar construction, with an average width of 3 m. The first one is located approximately 20 m from the current shoreline, at very low depth, with an east–west orientation parallel to the coastline. It goes from the side of the Triport promontory to approximately 700 m, until it closes at a right angle with the second wall. The second one is oriented north–south following a direction towards land. Those buildings have been initially identified as part of the infrastructure system of the port, however they can be actually identified with the surrounding walls of the lower city, which is now partially submerged by water and sand. 4th–3rd centuries BCE stamped tiles bearing the names of prytaneis that were found in the site testify to an urban-type political organization of the settlement.

Fifteen areas that concern the harbor activity of Triport have been identified, featuring a high concentration of archeologic materials. The ceramic material is dominated by the presence of pottery and amphorae represented by Corinthian and Corcyraean transport containers, as well as of fragments of Rhodian amphorae. They date from the end of the 5th century BCE to the 4th–3rd centuries BCE. Italic amphorae of the type Lamboglia 2 and Dressel 2–4 have a lower but still significant frequency. African productions are insignificant in comparison to late antique oriental amphorae. A later, albeit reduced, use of the site can be seen by the presence of amphorae from the 10th–13th centuries of the type Otranto 1 and 2, and Günsenin III. The circulation of these types of amphorae, which also occurred in Porto Palermo, particularly affected the southern Balkan area and the coasts Albania.

Triport had a key location on the coast because of the short distance between it and southern Italy. It was also situated at the starting point of important roads into the interior and lay near the Via Egnatia.

=== Ottoman period ===
The old stronghold of Jengjeç was located in Triport. The Ottoman Turkish writer and explorer Evliya Çelebi visited southern Albania in 1670, and he wrote about Jengjeç:

It is now an abandoned ruin with a large harbour. Gedik Ahmed Pasha partially destroyed the fortress and the towers at the mouth of the harbour when he conquered it. The stones left over were used to construct the fortress of Vlora during the reign of Sultan Suleiman. In the four corners of the harbour of Jengjeç are fishing weirs.

— Evliya Çelebi, "A Journey to Vlora and Durrës" (1670), Seyahatnâme

== Economy ==
Triport is the Fishing Port of Vlorë and one of the most important fishing ports of Albania. In the country it features the second largest fishing fleet – also including large industrial vessels. Triport is placed in front of Sazan Island, and most of fishing vessels operate near the island, within the borders of the Marine Protected Area of Sazan.

Recent surveys report that fishermen complain about the progressive decline in local fish resources, and about the decrease in their revenues over the years. The evidence indicates that local fish resources may be overexploited by small-scale fishing activities, but also by recreational and professional fishing activities, which may have exercised a cumulative impact on local habitats and living resources as well. Fishermen from the fishing community of Triport are in general reluctant to collaborate with scientists or members of the Regional Administration for Protected Areas at Vlora, and they are also not showing the will to cooperate with each other for the management of local fish resources. Scientists assert that "a more collaborative approach by and among fishermen—even in the absence of proper surveillance or enforcement—may be a positive condition cascading down to achieve a better state of local fishing resources."
