= Thronion (Illyria) =

Ancient city

Thronion (Ancient Greek: Θρόνιον) was an Ancient Greek city on the Illyrian coast, in the Bay of Vlorë on the southern Adriatic Sea. Although the earliest contacts appear to have been more pre-colonial activity rather than permanent settlement, an ancient, still archaeologically unproven tradition claims that the city was founded as a Locrian–Euboean colony on the fringes of the territory of the Amantes. Thronion was located to the south of the territory of Apollonia and in front of the Acroceraunian Mountains, the natural boundary between ancient Epirus and Illyria. Thronion was conquered by nearby Apollonia before 460 BCE.

Thronion has been identified with the site of Triport northwest of present-day Vlorë, Albania, where a large fortified port-town that was inhabited from the 6th century BCE to the 2nd century CE is found now partially submerged.

== Name ==
=== Attestation ===
The city was attested by Ancient Greek epigraphy as Θρόνιον (Thronion), inscribed on a monument erected by Apolloniates in Olympia, as well as on an official inquiry of the oracle of Dodona.

The Apollonian monument at Olympia was found by archaeologist Emil Kunze, but it was already documented by ancient geographer Pausanias (2nd century CE), who mentioned Thronion as a Locrian–Euboean colony and calls it a πόλισμα polisma. Pausanias reported that the sculptor of the Apollonian monument was the Athenian Lykios, son of Myron. If correct, this information would provide a further clue to the chronological dating of the monument, since Lykios has been probably active in the 440s and 430s.

=== Etymology ===
The city bears the same name as Thronion, the chief city of the Locrians.

== Location ==
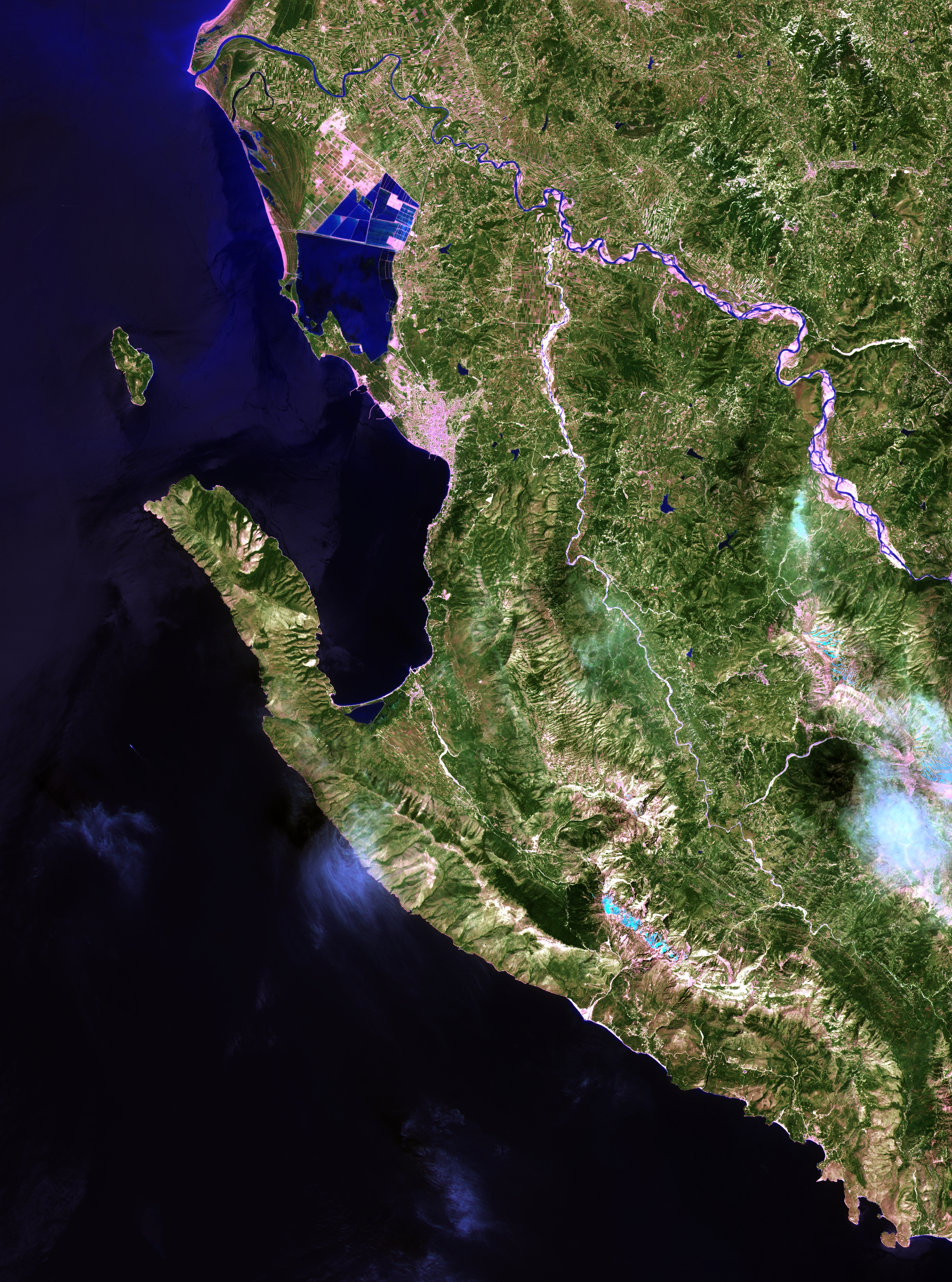

Pausanias places Thronion in front of the Acroceraunian Mountains and on the fringes of Abantis, which was the Hellenistic Greek interpretation of Amantia, the latter being attested by Pseudo-Scylax (mid-4th century BCE) who located it in southern Illyria, corresponding to the hinterland of the Bay of Vlorë. The interpretation of the toponym Amantia as Abantia besides mythological stories has been rationalized by ancient authors as a part of a colonization of the area from Euboea, which so far has not yet been proven by modern research. Thronion most likely was located on the southern border of the chora of nearby Apollonia, which expanded its territorial control to the south after conquering Thronion around 450 BCE.

The data from Pausanias and the Apollonian conquest of the city support the placement of the Euboean colony of Thronion on the coastal site of Triport located northwest of Vlorë and in front of the Acroceraunian Mountains. (Note: A previous proposal for the location of Thonion was Kaninë, an inland site to the south-east of Vlorë that features only a small Illyrian hilltop fortification dating at the earliest to the 4th–3rd centuries BCE, but recently scholars are abandoning this proposal, and favoring the location at the archaeological site discovered at Triport.) On this site a large fortified port-town that was inhabited from the 6th century BCE to the 2nd century CE is found, now partially submerged. The site of Triport has been also identified with ancient Aulon, which appeared in historial sources starting form the 2nd century CE. Those identifications are not in contradiction with each other. It has been suggested that a transfer of the ancient city has occurred from the site of Triport to the site of modern Vlorë.

Admitting that Triport corresponds to Thronion, conquered by Apollonia in the 5th century BC, Apollonia's territory was close to Orikos, which would explain Orikos' probable imitation of an Apollonian coin type, intended to facilitate trade.

== History ==
=== Archaic period ===
The shores of the Bay of Vlorë on the Illyrian coast, which are characterised by the best harbors, had already been occupied in early times, as implied by the fact that Corinthians settled the site of Apollonia (around 600 BCE) and not the shores of the Bay. During the Greek colonisation the coastal area of the Bay was settled by Archaic Greek colonists, who traditionally founded Orikos, Thronion and Aulon on those shores. The hinterland of the bay was inhabited by Illyrians.

Thronion was traditionally supposed to be founded as a Locrian–Euboean colony on the Illyrian coast. According to part of the ancient literary tradition, the Euboeans were the first colonizers of the Adriatic Sea. Plutarch (1st–2nd centuries CE) alludes to an Euboean presence in Korkyra, and Pseudo-Scymnus (2nd century BCE) attributes the founding of Orikos, on the Illyrian coast at the southern end of the Bay of Vlorë, to Euboean legendary heroes returning from the Trojan War. The same legend linked to the nostoi is taken up by Pausanias (2nd century CE) about the region of Thronion, a city which was to have been founded by a group of Locrians and Abantes – the Homeric designation of the Euboeans – during their return from the Trojan conflict. The Euboean presence in the Adriatic, asserted by ancient literature but so far not corroborated by archaeological material, remains very problematic. Only more in-depth research in the field will be able to provide more precise answers about what appears to have been more pre-colonial contact than permanent settlement. The populations of the area developed colonial myths which linked them to the legendary heroes returning from the Trojan War. Thronion claimed descent from Greek heroes. Based on this tradition the founding colonists named the settlement Thronion after the Locrian city located in Euboia and its region was named Abantis after the name used for Euboea by Homer. It was probably nearby Apollonia, which identified itself with the Trojan side, that initiated the interpretation of the conflict between Trojans and Greeks, in contrapposition to the people of Thronion, the Greek Abantes, which were assimilated by homonymy to the local Amantes. Pausanias' data have been compared with the information provided by an Apollonian commemorative monument, suggesting an "oppositional ethnicity" between the Greek colonial associations of the Bay of Aulon (i.e. the area called Abantis), and the barbarians of the hinterland.

=== Classical period ===
Before 460 BCE a war was fought between Apollonia and Thronion. Apolloniates won and conquered Thronion, and the conquerors were satisfied obtaining the fringes of the territory of the Amantes. By conquering Thronion, the Apolloniates had achieved two goals: they had substantially enlarged their territory towards the Illyrian hinterland and had also acquired a profitable source of money. It gave the Apolloniates control over the lower valley of the Shushicë river, a tributary of the Aoös (modern Vjosa), and consolidated their control over the sanctuary of Nymphaion and the area of the bitumen mines of present-day Selenicë, located to the east of the confluence of the Shushicë into the Aoös. Through that expansion Apollonia benefitted from the exploitation of new fertile lands. With the spoils of Thronion, the Apolloniates erected a monument at Olympia celebrating their victory and conquest. This turn may have also been the result of Apollonia's increasing power towards nearby Epirote lands.

After the Apollonian conquest of Thronion, the region experienced the development of indigenous proto-urban settlements into urban settlements, like Amantia of the Amantes and Nikaia of the Bylliones, where polygonal walls and cyclopean ramparts were built around mid-5th century BCE. Territorial modifications apparently took place in this sector during the 4th century BCE, with a withdrawal of Apollonia onto its previous domain.

== Economy ==
The wealth of Thronion may have derived in part from control of the bitumen mines around present-day Selenica, until the Apollonian conquest of the city before 460 BCE.

== See also ==
- List of settlements in Illyria
- List of ancient Greek cities
- List of cities in ancient Epirus

== Bibliography ==
- Bejko, Lorenc; Morris, Sarah; Papadopoulos, John; Schepartz, Lynne (2015). The Excavation of the Prehistoric Burial Tumulus at Lofkend, Albania. ISD LLC. ISBN 978-1938770524.
- Bereti, Vasil; Quantin, François; Cabanes, Pierre (2011). "Histoire et épigraphie dans la région de Vlora (Albanie)". REA. 113 (1).
- Cabanes, Pierre (2008). "Greek Colonisation in the Adriatic". In Tsetskhladze, Gocha R. (ed.). Greek Colonisation: An Account of Greek Colonies and Other Settlements Overseas. Vol. 2. Brill. pp. 155–186. ISBN 9789047442448.
- Cabanes, Pierre (2011). "Disa çështje mbi Amantët / Interrogations sur les Amantes". Iliria. 35: 75–98. doi:10.3406/iliri.2011.1100.
- Castiglioni, Maria Paola (2018). "Les Grecs en Adriatique". Cadernos do Lepaarque. XV (29): 320–339. doi:10.15210/lepaarq.v15i29.11495. ISSN 2316-8412.
- Chapinal-Heras, Diego (2021). Experiencing Dodona: The Development of the Epirote Sanctuary from Archaic to Hellenistic Times. Berlin and Boston: Walter de Gruyter GmbH & Co KG. ISBN 978-3-11-072759-3.
- Dominguez-Monedero, Adolfo J. (2014). "Eubeos y locrios entre el Jónico y el Adriático". L. Breglia, A. Moleti (Eds.) Hespería. Tradizioni, rotte, paesaggi. Tekmeria, 16. Paestum. Pandemos. 2014. P. 189-210.
- Jaupaj, Lavdosh (2019). Etudes des interactions culturelles en aire Illyro-épirote du VII au III siècle av. J.-C (Thesis). Université de Lyon; Instituti i Arkeologjisë (Albanie).
- Lasagni, Chiara (2019). Le realtà locali nel mondo greco: Ricerche su poleis ed ethne della Grecia occidentale. Studi e testi di epigrafia. Edizioni dell'Orso. ISBN 978-88-6274-962-6.
- Malkin, Irad (2001). Ancient Perceptions of Greek Ethnicity. Center for Hellenic Studies, Trustees for Harvard University. ISBN 0-674-00662-3.
- Morgan, Catherine (2018). "Nostoi and Material Culture in the Area of the Classical-Hellenistic Ionian and Adriatic Seas". In Simon Hornblower, Giulia Biffis (ed.). The Returning Hero: Nostoi and Traditions of Mediterranean Settlement. Oxford University Press. pp. 213–244. ISBN 978-0-19-881142-8.
- Papadopoulos, John (2016). "Komai, Colonies and Cities in Epirus and Southern Albania: The Failure of the Polis and the Rise of Urbanism on the Fringes of the Greek World". In Molloy, Barry P.C. (ed.). Of Odysseys and Oddities: Scales and Modes of Interaction Between Prehistoric Aegean Societies and their Neighbours. Oxbow Books. pp. 435–460. ISBN 978-1-78570-232-7.
- Papadopoulos, John K.; Bejko, Lorenc; Morris, Sarah P. (2007). "Excavations at the Prehistoric Burial Tumulus of Lofkënd in Albania: A Preliminary Report for the 2004-2005 Seasons". American Journal of Archaeology. 111 (1): 105–147. doi:10.3764/aja.111.1.105. S2CID 192986428.
- Quantin, François (2018). "Divinités d'Orikos et de sa région: État des lieux documentaire et perspectives de recherche". SLSA Jahresbericht – Rapport annuel – Annual report 2017 (PDF). SLSA. pp. 93–108. ISBN 978-3-9524771-1-3.
- Stickler, Timo (2014). Korinth und seine Kolonien: Die Stadt am Isthmus im Mächtegefüge des klassischen Griechenland. KLIO / Beihefte. Neue Folge (in German). Vol. 15. Walter de Gruyter GmbH & Co KG. ISBN 9783050089133.
- Stocker, Sharon R. (2009). Illyrian Apollonia: Toward a New Ktisis and Developmental History of the Colony.
- Volpe, Giuliano; Disantarosa, Giacomo; Leone, Danilo; Turchiano, Maria (2014). "Porti, approdi e itinerari dell'Albania meridionale dall'Antichità al Medioevo. Il 'Progetto Liburna'". Ricerche Archeologiche in Albania. Aracne: 287–326. doi:10.4399/978885487245516 (inactive 1 July 2025). ISBN 978-88-548-7245-5.
- Wilkes, J. J.; Fischer-Hansen, Tobias (2004). "The Adriatic". In Mogens Herman Hansen; Thomas Heine Nielsen (eds.). An Inventory of Archaic and Classical Poleis. Oxford University Press. pp. 321–337. ISBN 0-19-814099-1.
- Zindel, Christian; Lippert, Andreas; Lahi, Bashkim; Kiel, Machiel (2018). Albanien: Ein Archäologie- und Kunstführer von der Steinzeit bis ins 19. Jahrhundert (in German). Vandenhoeck & Ruprecht. ISBN 9783205200109.
