= Vlorë Castle =

- Kalaja e Vlorës; Kalaja e Skelës
- Vlorë, Albania
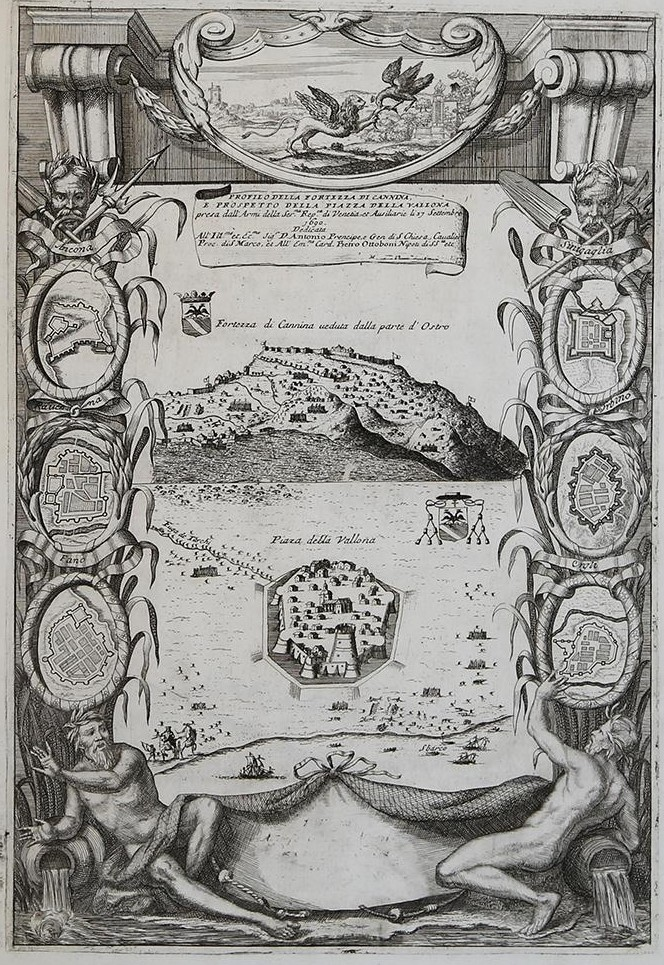
- Kaninë Castle (top) and Vlorë Castle (bottom) with Coat of Arms

Site information
- Owner: Albania
- Controlled by: Ottoman Empire

Location
- Location within Albania
- Coordinates: 40.455073°N 19.485369°E

Site history
- Built: 1537
- Demolished: 1906

Vlorë Castle (Albanian: Kalaja e Vlorës or Kalaja e Skelës) was a castle in Vlorë, Albania. It was built in 1537 during the reign of Suleiman the Magnificent and existed until 1906. It was one of the biggest military structures of the Ottoman Empire in the Balkans and had an especially strategic importance for the Ottomans.

== Background ==
While preparing his Corfu Campaign Sultan Suleiman the Magnificent spent some time in Vlora from the 13th of July 1537 until the 18th of August 1537. It was during his stay that the building of the castle was started. The town of Vlora had a strategic importance to the Ottomans, as it could be used as a bridgehead to Western Europe. It was in 1480 that the Ottomans first used the strategic important bay to send troops to Italy and capture the castle of Otranto.

Mimar Sinan was most probably involved in designing the castle, as he accompanied Sulemain during his Corfu Campaign as a military engineer. Another important building built in Vlora during that time by Mimar Sinan was the Muradie Mosque.

During the Sixth Ottoman-Venetian war the castle was captured by Venetian forces in 1690. Together with the town of Vlora and its surroundings they were held by the Republic of Venice until the reconquest of the Ottomans in 1691.

== Construction ==
The castle had an octagonal shape. Each wall was around 100 metres long, which means that the castle occupied a surface of around 3.5-4ha. Each of the corners had a hexagonal bastion. Overall the castle had 2 gates which were secured by drawbridges as the walls were surrounded by water. The wall that faced the seas was accompanied by a tower to secure the castle against any amphibious landings. It housed a garrison of several hundred soldiers.

The castle took over 20 months to be built and had a cost of 33,107 Venetian gold ducats. The existing documents give high costs for transport but rather low costs for the materials. The most probable reason behind this is the usage of building material from the castle of Yengeç in modern day Triport a few kilometres away.

== Descriptions ==
The Ottoman traveller Evliya Çelebi describes the castle in his Seyahatname in 1670 as follows:

"The fortress of Vlora is built on a low sandy spit at the entrance to the Bay of Vlora and the Bay of Dukat. It is octagonal in shape and is very strong and solid, a veritable great wall of Sultan Süleiman. People say the Ottomans do not know how to build fortresses, but anyone who has not seen the fortresses of Szeged on the frontier of Eger, the fortress of Bender on the banks of the Dniester river on the frontier of Ochakov, and this fortress of Vlora, cannot understand how masterful Ottoman construction work can be.

The walls of the fortress of Vlora are 20 ells high and 10 ells thick on all sides. At the 8 corners of the fortress walls there are 8 large bastions, each like the walls of Gog and Magog, and each surmounted by 7 great long-range battering guns. Aside from these, inside the iron gates at sea level there are 47 other battering guns with rifled barrels looking out towards the bay and mounted on carriages with seven-headed dragons. They are covered with red canvas and are so big that a man can fit into their barrels. The cannons are ready to fire at all times, and the men guarding them lie right beside them day and night. From one corner to the next of the 8 corners is a distance of 120 paces, so if we add it up, we come up with the total circumference for the fortress of Vlora of 900 [sic] paces. Inside the fortress is the Mosque of Sultan Suleiman and at the very centre is the tower of Suleiman Shah. It is a very tall and finely-wrought tower, 7 storeys high, and is built of chiselled stonework with a lead-covered conical dome and is topped by a guilded pinnacle. This may be considered the citadel of the fortress of Vlora. It is a very solid and tall tower, like the Kalamaria Tower in Thessalonika, since both of them were built by the great Sinan, the architect of Sultan Suleiman. The tower is inhabited only by the warden and is filled with layer upon layer of munitions and other military equipment and supplies.

Inside the outer fortress there are some 300 squat and narrow old-fashioned earthen houses with tiled roofs and with no vineyard, garden or courtyard. Although the public thoroughfares are wide, there is nothing else but a bazaar: no khans, baths or other public buildings. The fortress has 2 gates, the space between them being completely full of munitions of various kinds. It is guarded by sentries and watchmen day and night. One gate faces east and the other west. The fortress is completely surrounded by a moat 50 paces wide on all sides and filled with sea water, which is, however, swampy. Each of the gates has a drawbridge in front of it which is raised at night and secured with chains to form a protective barrier. There are 500 cannons, small and large. The tower is inhabited by the warden, 12 officers and 400 garrison troops. Half of these soldiers were ordered to depart to defend the vilayet of Mania in accordance with the imperial decree. Also here are the steward of the sipahis, the commander of the janissaries, a qadi with a salary level of 300 akçe and responsible for 105 prosperous villages in the region, a market inspector, a collector of tolls, a customs inspector, a poll-tax official, a chief architect, an officer of the admiralty, and the mayor of the town."

== Demolition ==
The castle was demolished in 1906 by the Ottoman authorities, as the stones were needed to pave the road from the town of Vlora to the port (iskele, modern day Skela district) which was close to the castle. In its place (40°27'20.94"N 19°29'20.79"E) today stands the Flamurtari Stadium.

== Aftermath ==
No photographs of the castle exist, its appearance has only been described or documented through drawings. Up until at least the 1930's the outline of the castle is visible on old aerial photographs. Today the Flamurtari Stadium occupies most of the site of the former castle.

== Gallery ==
Drawings of the Castle

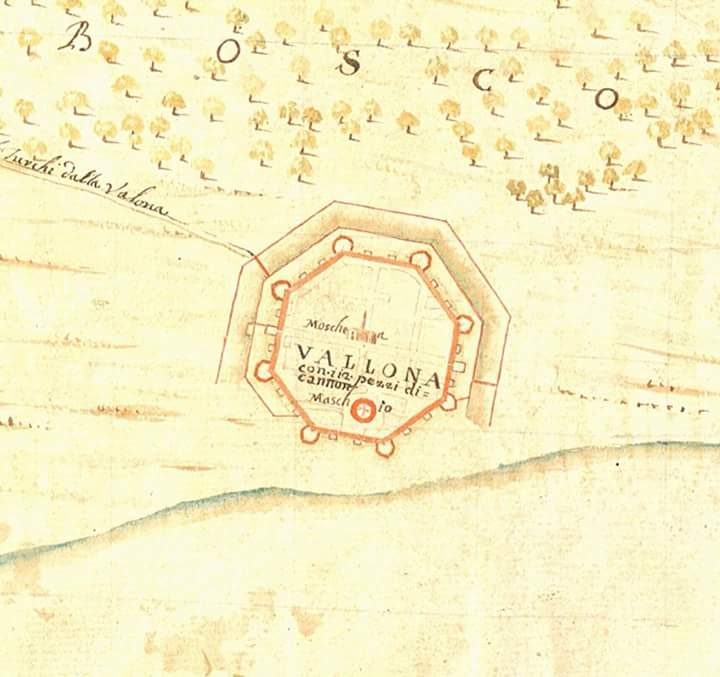

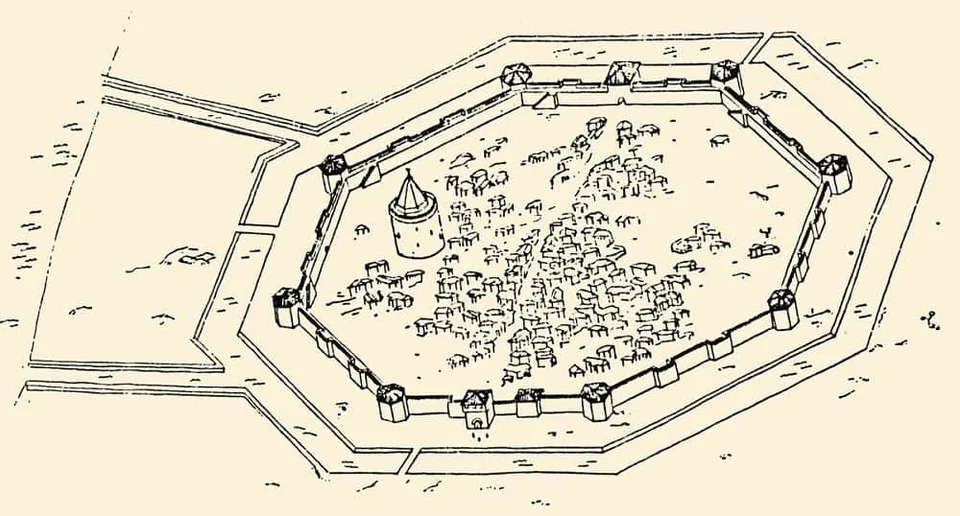

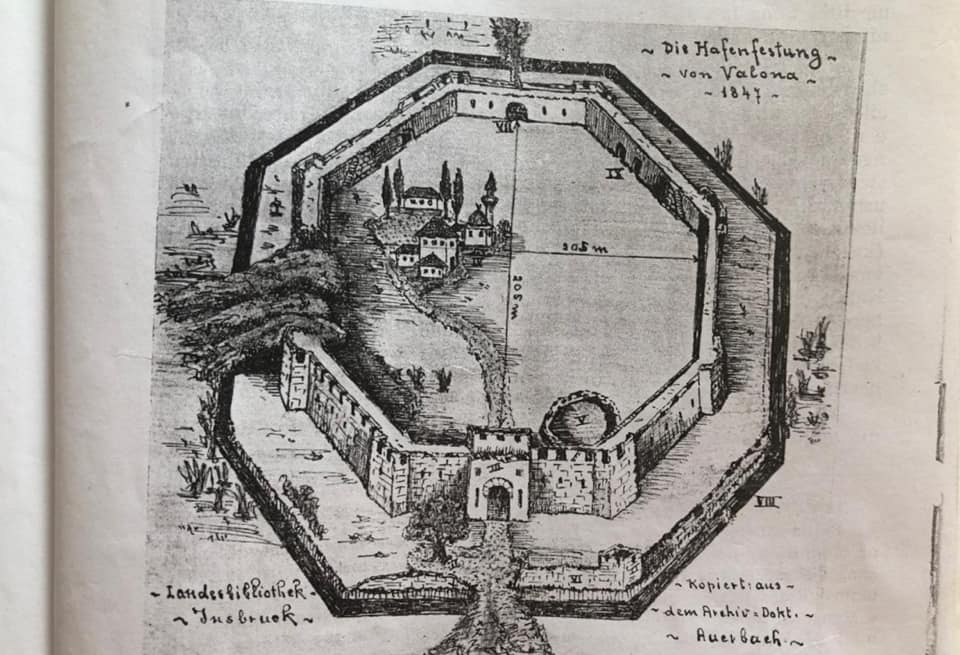

== See also ==
- Vlore
- List of castles in Albania
- Tourism in Albania
