= Abantes =

Ancient Greek people of Euboea

The Abantes or Abantians (Greek: Ἄβαντες, Ábantes) were an ancient Greek tribe. Their home was Euboea.

== History ==
The Abantes were a Proto-Greek tribe. Aristotle and Arrian considered them to be Thracian and from the Phocian city of Abae. They migrated to the island of Euboea. Afterwards, it became known as Abantia or Abantis. They also lived in Argos, Chalcis, Histiaea, Sikion, Cerinthus, Dios, Styra, Phocis, Epirus, and Illyria. Arethousa, daughter of Hyperes, is said to have mothered Abas with Poseidon. According to myth Abas became the first king of the Abantes. Abas had a son named Chalkodon who became the second king of the Abantes. He was killed by Amphitryon whilst besieging Thebes. His son was Elephenor, who became the third king of the Abantes. In the Iliad, Homer mentions the Abantes among the Greek allies in the Trojan War. Their leader was Elephenor. The Trojan warrior Agenor killed Elephenor. According to Homer they fought on the Greek side in the Trojan War with 40 warships. The Abantes had a reputation for being fierce spearmen and a warlike people. When the Trojan War concluded, the Abantes wandered around for a while, and finally settled in the region of Thesprotia. Herodotus states that many Abantes from Euboea had established colonies in Chios and Asia Minor. Homer described the Abantes wearing their hair short in the front and long in the back. This style of haircut was designed to prevent enemy warriors from grabbing their hair.

== Colonies ==
Pausanias writes that they contributed to a colony from Thronium in Thesprotis. The local area became known as Abantis. Eventually it was conquered by Apollonia with the help of Corinth. Another colony was sent to Chios, but eventually it was defeated and the survivors forced to flee.
