= Mallakastër District =

Defunct (2000) Albanian administrative area

Mallakastër District Rrethi i Mallakastrës
- Former district
- Coordinates: 40°34′N 19°45′E
- Country: Albania
- Dissolved: 2000
- Seat: Ballsh

Area
  - Total: 325 km^{2} (125 sq mi)

Population (2001)
  - Total: 39,881
  - Density: 123/km^{2} (318/sq mi)
- Time zone: UTC+1 (CET)
  - Summer (DST): UTC+2 (CEST)

Mallakastër District (Albanian: Rrethi i Mallakastrës) was one of the 36 districts of Albania, which were dissolved in July 2000 and replaced by 12 newly created counties. It had a population of 39,881 in 2001, and an area of 325 km^{2} (125 sq mi). It is in the south of the country, and its capital was the town of Ballsh. The area of the former district is coextensive with the present municipality of Mallakastër, which is part of Fier County.

== Administrative divisions ==
The district consisted of the following municipalities:

- Aranitas
- **Ballsh**
- Fratar
- Greshicë
- Hekal
- Kutë
- Ngraçan
- Qendër
- Selitë

Note: - urban municipalities in bold
