= Selitë =

Selitë may refer to:

- Selitë, Elbasan, a village in the municipality of Cërrik, Elbasan County, Albania
- Selitë, Fier, a village in the municipality of Mallakastër, Fier County, Albania
- Selitë, Kurbin, a village in the municipality of Kurbin, Lezhë County, Albania
- Selitë, Mirditë, a village in the municipality of Mirditë, Lezhë County, Albania
- Selitë, Tirana, a village in the municipality of Tirana, Tirana County, Albania
- Selitë Mali, a village in the municipality of Tirana, Tirana County, Albania
- Selita (tribe), a tribe in northern Albania
