= Selita (tribe) =

Selita is an Albanian tribe or fis from the Mirdita region. Several places in Albania are toponyms originating from the name of the tribe, including the Selitë of Mallakastër, Selitë in Mirditë as well as two villages in Tiranë, Selitë and Selitë Mali.
