= Byllis =

Archaeological park in Albania

- Bylis (in Albanian); Βύλλις or Βουλλίς (in Greek)
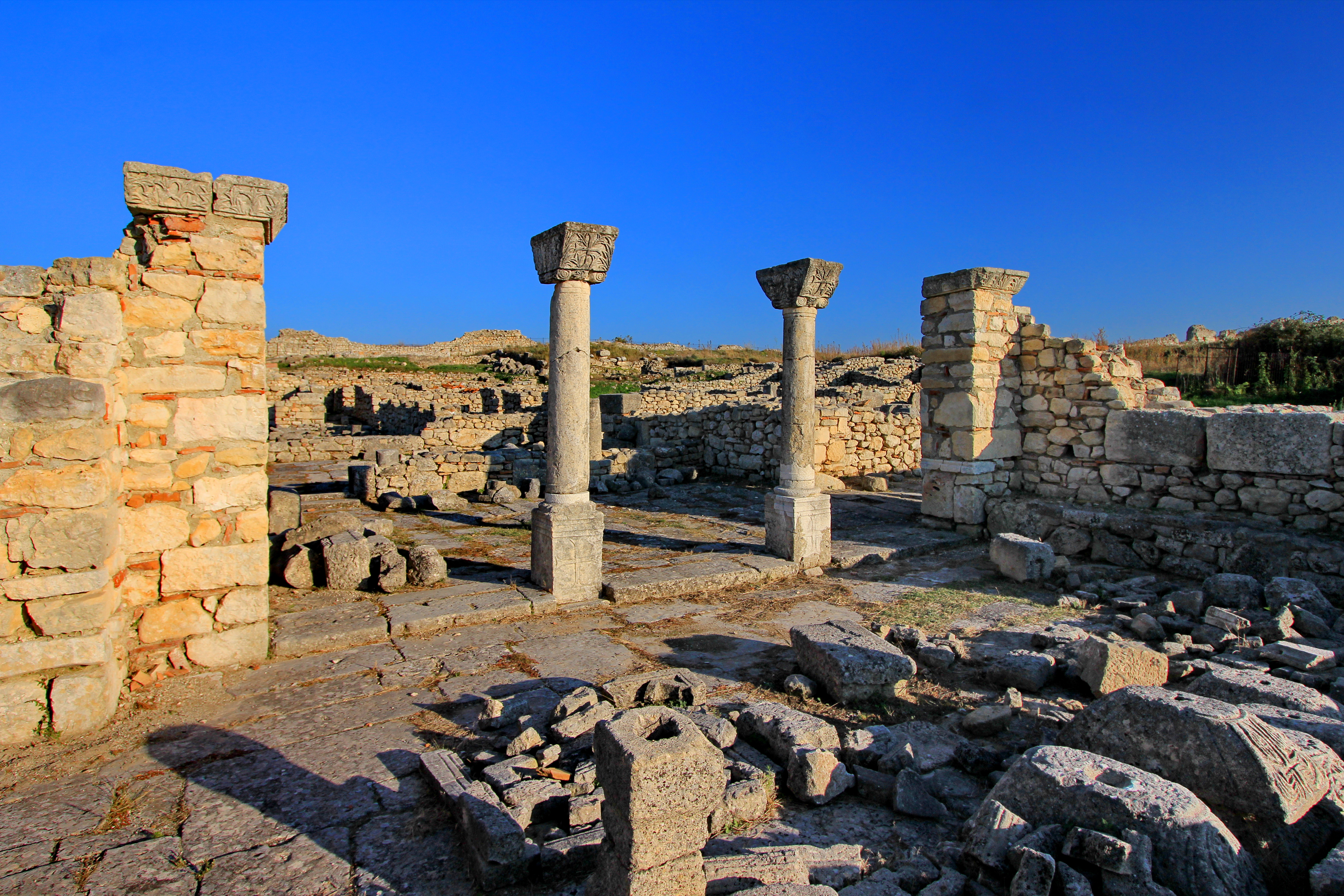
- Ruins of Bylis

- Location in Albania
- 40°32′25″N 19°44′15″E
- Type: Settlement
- Periods: Classical; Hellenistic; Roman; Byzantine
- Cultures: Illyrian; Ancient Greek; Roman
- Location: Hekal, Fier County, Albania
- Region: Illyria

Site notes
- Excavation dates: 1978–1991; 2000–present
- Archaeologists: Camillo Prashniker; Neritan Ceka; Skënder Muçaj; Jean-Pierre Sodini; Pascale Chevalier; Nicolas Beaudry
- Owner: Public

Cultural Monument of Albania

Official Logo

Byllis (Albanian: Bylis; Greek: Βύλλις; Latin: Byllis) or Bullis or Boullis (Βουλλίς) was an ancient city and the chief settlement of the Illyrian tribe of the Bylliones, traditionally located in southern Illyria. In Hellenistic times the city was either part of Illyria or Epirus. In Roman times it was included within Epirus Nova, in the province of Macedonia. The remains of Byllis are situated north-east of Vlorë, 25 kilometers from the sea in Hekal, Fier County, Albania. Byllis was designated as an archaeological park on 7 April 2003 by the government of Albania.

The massive walls of Byllis were built around 350 BC when the Illyrians went through a dynamic development founding their own cities. The urban settlement was built on the territory of the community of the Bylliones on an already existent Illyrian hilltop proto-urban area dating back to the previous century. Later Byllis acquired the trappings of a Hellenistic town, and because the southernmost Illyrian tribes, including the Bylliones, were inclined to become bilingual, it was also a Greek-speaking city. Byllis received sacred ancient Greek envoys, known as theoroi, during the early 2nd century BC, which only cities that were considered Greek were eligible to receive. The time duration that passed before Illyrian cities were documented on a list of theorodokoi clarifies that acculturation did take place in southern Illyria, however it indicates that the process was gradual.

During the Roman-Illyrian war in 169/168 BC the Bylliones took part on the Roman side against the Illyrian king Gentius. However, the subsequent alliance of Byllis with Molossians and Macedonians led to its sacking and destruction by the Romans. After a long decline, in 30 BC the city became a Roman colony. In Roman times Byllis rose again, also becoming a bishopric in late antiquity.

== Name ==
=== Attestation ===
The toponym is attested as Βύλλις, η on epigraphic material from the 3rd-2nd centuries BC, and as Βουλλίς Boullis by Ptolemy in his Geography. The city ethnic is attested as Βυλλίων Byllion on the inscription of an oracular lead tablet from Dodona dating back to the 4th century BC and on coins of the Hellenistic era dating back to the 3rd-2nd centuries BC, or as Βουλινός Boulinos by Pseudo-Scymnus. The city is attested as a polis exclusively in the work of Stephanus of Byzantium in the 6th century AD, who mentions it as πόλις 'Ιλλυρίδος polis Illyridos, and its ethnicon as Βυλλιδεύς Bullideus. Stephanus of Byzantium mentions a town called Byllis as a seaside city in Illyria and its foundation legend, according to which the city was supposedly built by Myrmidons under Neoptolemus, returning from the Trojan War towards its homeland. This legendary tradition of the city is reflected also by numismatics of the Hellenistic era, however it is contradicted by archaeological research.

=== Usage ===
It has been suggested that the city had its own ethnic, Βυλλιδεύς, with coinage which bore the legend ΒΥΛΛΙΣ minted separately from the coinage of the tribe of the Bylliones which bore the legend ΒΥΛΛΙΟΝΩΝ. However both those names appear on coins that were issued by the koinon of the Bylliones. A recent analysis of the epigraphy and numismatics of the area seems to indicate an alternating use of the names: the ethnos with its territory on the one hand, and the "tribal" polis that was the capital of the ethnos on the other hand, being internally organized with a political authority represented by the decision-making bodies of the koinon of the Bylliones, while representing the urban center of reference for the community.

== History ==
=== Classical period ===
Byllis was founded on the territory of the Illyrian community of the Bylliones around 350 BC, on an already existent proto-urban area dating back to the previous century. Initially it was one of the several fortified Illyrian hilltops that controlled the high hills of the region of Mallakastër. The area was on the edge of the sphere of influence by Apollonia and Epidamnos, as well as of Epirus. The foundation of the Illyrian city in the 4th century on the northern edge of the Vjosa valley is probably connected with the presence of bitumen mines near Selenica, which were located on the opposite edge of the valley.

Mid-4th century BC fortification walls were built with isodomic ashlar layers. The walls were 2.25 km long and 3.5 m wide, enclosing an area of 30 hectares around a steep hill. In the sanctuary of Dodona a 4th-century BC inscription on a lead foil provides the earliest known attestation of the Bylliones, asking to which deity they should sacrifice in order to ensure the safety of their possessions.

=== Hellenistic period ===
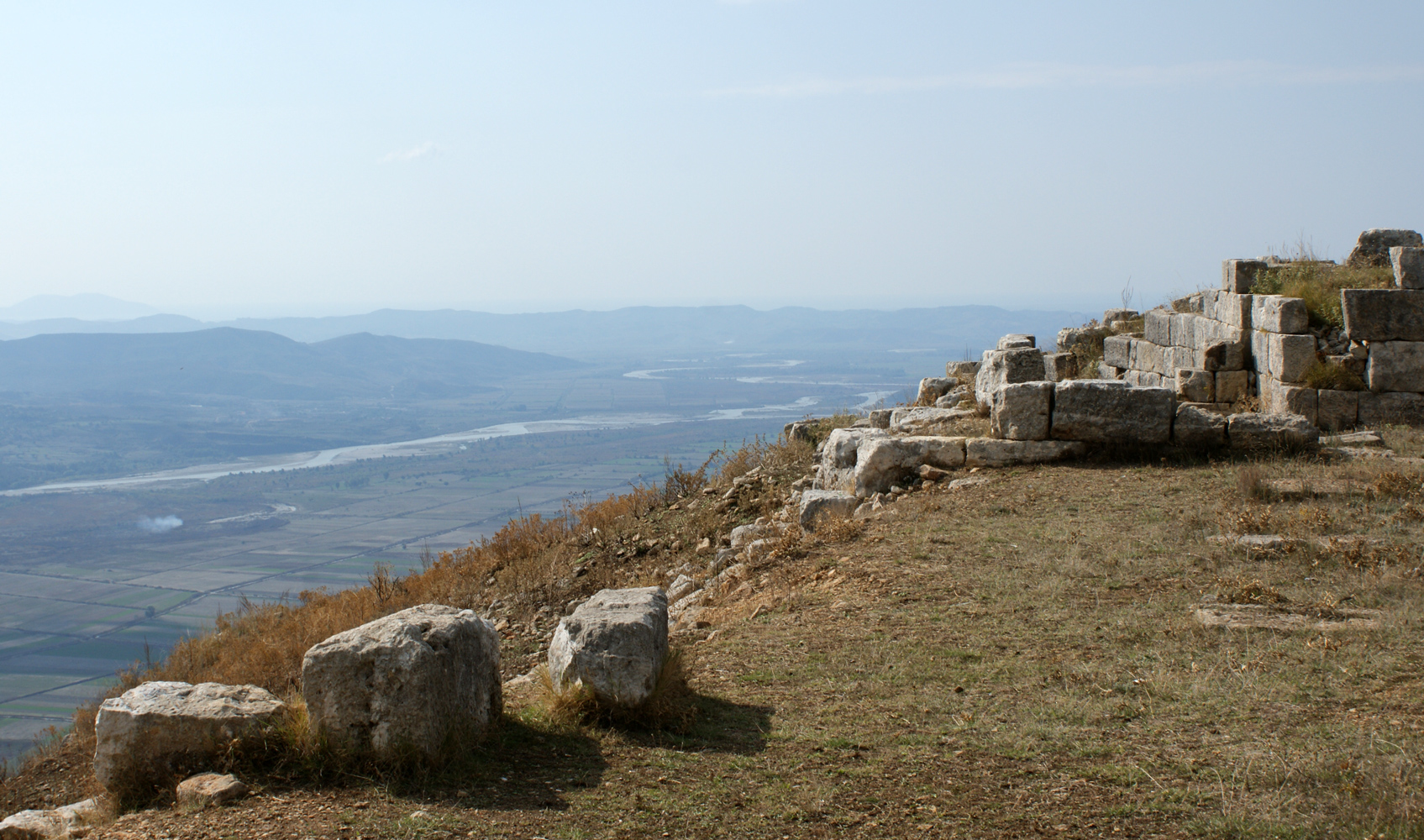
Image of the ancient site of Byllis and the river Vjosa in the distance.

The city experienced a notable development in the Hellenistic period, representing the chief settlement of the Illyrian koinon of the Bylliones, of which several hilltop centers are found in the lower valley of the Vjosa river. The archaeological remains confirm that in Hellenistic times Byllis was a cultural and political centre of the region. The creation of Hellenistic cities such as Byllis in the territory of southern Albania has been attributed to the successors of Alexander the Great and Pyrrhus of Epirus.

In 314 the territorial community of Byllis was occupied by Cassander of Macedon. After two years it was under the rule of the Illyrian king Glaukias of the Taulantii, who drove out the Macedonians from the region. Afterwards the area was occupied by Pyrrhus of Epirus and his son Alexander II of Epirus. In 270 BC the Illyrian king Mytilos established control over the hinterland of Apollonia. Nevertheless the life of Byllis proceeded without much alteration.

Local inscriptions begin in the middle of the 4th century BC and are related to a polis-like organization. They are exclusively in Greek, as are institutions, the titles of the officials and other parts of the organization of the settlement. Those inscriptions reveal typical features of the north-western Greek dialect. Archaeological explorations have not yet found a sanctuary or temple in the city of Byllis, however, a series of inscriptions show the adoption of the Ancient Greek cults of Zeus, Hera, Dionysius and Artemis. Among the typical Ancient Greek cults found in Byllis are those of Zeus Tropaios, Hera Teleia, Poseidon, Parthenos. (Note: Several goddesses in the Greek Pantheon had the epithet Parthenos ("virgin"), including Artemis, Athena, Hera and Persephone.)

Ancient sources and epigraphic material provide evidence that the territory of the Bylliones included, close to the bitumen mines, a fire sanctuary with an oracle, named Nymphaion in ancient Greek historiography, which was located on the border with nearby Apollonia. The nymphaeum also appears as a fire symbol engraved on coins of Byllis minted in the 3rd-2nd century BC. A relief found near Byllis also shows the nymphs and a cloth wrapped around this fire, a scene that is repeated only with the nymphs depicted on a 1st-century BC silver coin of Apollonia, suggesting an admixture of local traditions and religions with the forms and practices brought by Greek colonists at Apollonia. Under Greek influence the local Illyrian spontaneous and naturalistic cult started its canonization.

The corpus of the names in Hellenistic epigraphic material mainly belong to the northern Greek onomastic area (e.g. Alexander, Andriscus, Archelaus, Kebbas, Maketa, Machatas, Nikanor, Peukolaos, Phalakros, Philotas, Drimakos and Alexommas) while a few names belong to Illyrian onomastics (e.g. Preuratos, Triteutas, Trasos). In the second half of the 20th century historians Fanoula Papazoglu and N.G.L. Hammond have asserted that Byllis was an Ancient Greek foundation on the territory of the Illyrian Bylliones, and Miltiades Hatzopoulos (1997) has asserted that it was the northernmost Greek city of non-colonial foundation in the region. In the 21st century scholars consider Byllis as an Illyrian city that later acquired the trappings of a Hellenistic town, becoming very much organized on a Greek model.

Because the southernmost Illyrian tribes, including the Bylliones, were inclined to become bilingual, it was also a Greek-speaking city. Byllis received ancient Greek sacred envoys (theoroi) from Delphi, during the early 2nd century BC. Only cities that were considered Greek were eligible to receive theoroi, which indicates that by this time Byllis was considered a Greek city or that its inhabitants had become Greek-speaking. The time duration that passed before Illyrian cities were documented on a list of theorodokoi clarifies that acculturation did take place in southern Illyria, however it indicates that the process was gradual.

Plan of the site of Byllis

In the Hellenistic era (3rd century BC) a stadium, a theatre, an agora, two stoas, a cistern and a peristyle temple were built in the city. There were 6 gates in the city walls. The road coming from Apollonia passed through two of them, crossing Byllis in the direction of the narrows of gorges of the Vjosa river on the way to Macedonia or those of Antigonia in the direction of Epirus. In 2011 during a road reconstruction near the archaeological park found in the site a statue of the Hellenistic era, which may depict an Illyrian soldier or a war deity, was discovered.

The Illyrian koinon of the Bylliones, which had been hellenized to a degree and was bilingual, was a coalition of one or two poleis, as attested after 232 BC. The league was restricted to Byllis and Nikaea, and Byllis considered Nikaia as one of its demes. Nikaia was a member of the league, as a 2nd-century BC inscription indicates.

During the Roman-Illyrian war in 169/168 BC the Bylliones took part on the Roman side against the Illyrian king Gentius. However, subsequently Byllis allied with the Molossians and Macedonians against the Romans, leading to its sacking and destruction by the Roman army.

=== Roman and Byzantine period ===
Under the Roman Empire, Byllis became part of the province of Epirus Nova. Its name often occurs at the time of the Great Roman Civil War.

After a long decline, the city rose again in 30 BC as a Roman colony, which is attested by epigraphic material and by Pliny the Elder, who called it Colonia Bullidensis. Its territory is called Bylliake (Βυλλιακή) by Strabo. The walls of Byllis carry more than four inscriptions written in Greek with details regarding their construction by the engineer Victorinus, as ordered by Emperor Justinian I (483-565).

During the early Christian period Byllis remained an important settlement in Epirus Nova though it was reduced in size. A significant number of basilica churches have been unearthed which contained mosaic floors and various carvings. Two of those basilicas had possibly diaconicon chambers attached, while a baptistery was established at basilica B.

== Association with see of Apollonia ==
One of the participants in the Council of Ephesus in 431 was a Felix who signed once as Bishop of Apollonia and Byllis, at another time as Bishop of Apollonia. Some assume that the two towns formed a single episcopal see, others suppose he was, strictly speaking, Bishop only of Apollonia, but was temporarily in charge also of Byllis during a vacancy of that see. At the Council of Chalcedon in 451, Eusebius subscribes simply as Bishop of Apollonia. In the letter of the bishops of Epirus Nova to the Byzantine Emperor Leo I in 458, Philocharis subscribed as Bishop of what the manuscripts call "Vallidus", and which editors think should be corrected to "Byllis". Whether Philocharis is to be considered Bishop also of Apollonia depends on the interpretation of the position of Felix in 431.

The Annuario Pontificio lists Apollonia as a titular see, thus recognizing that it was once a residential diocese, a suffragan of the archbishopric of Dyrrachium. It grants no such recognition to Byllis.

== Gallery ==
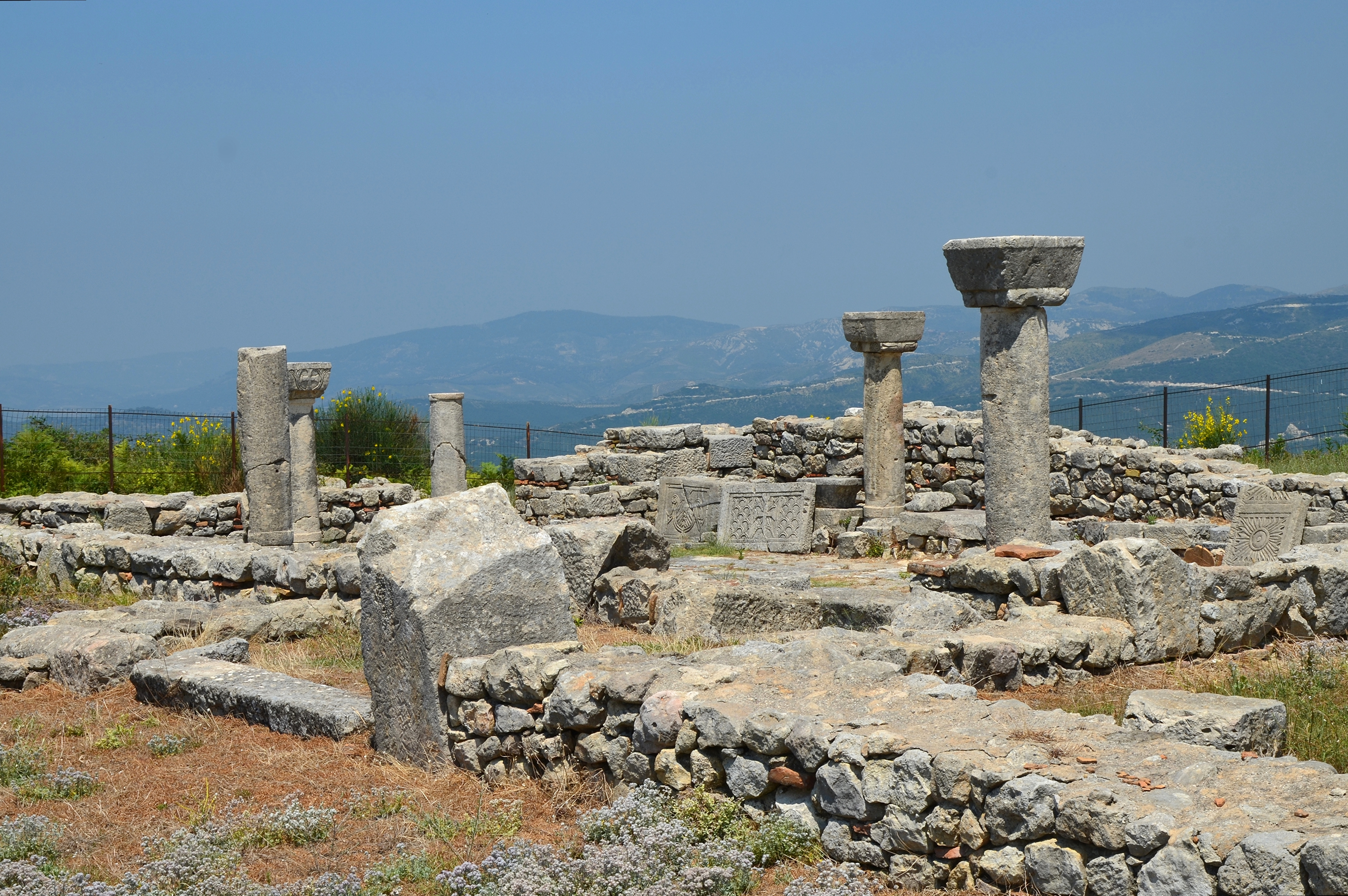
Remains of the Basilica

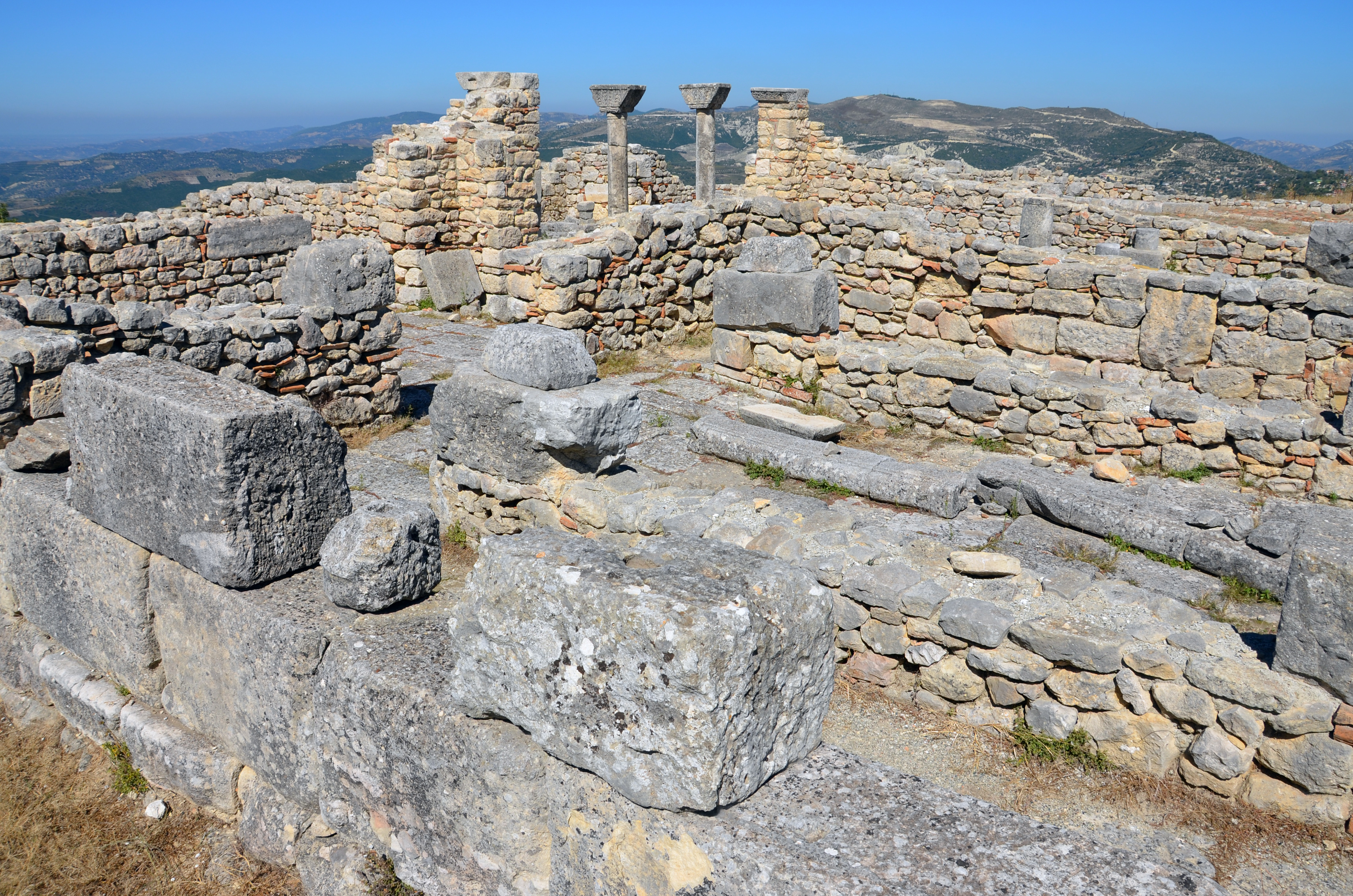
Episcopal building

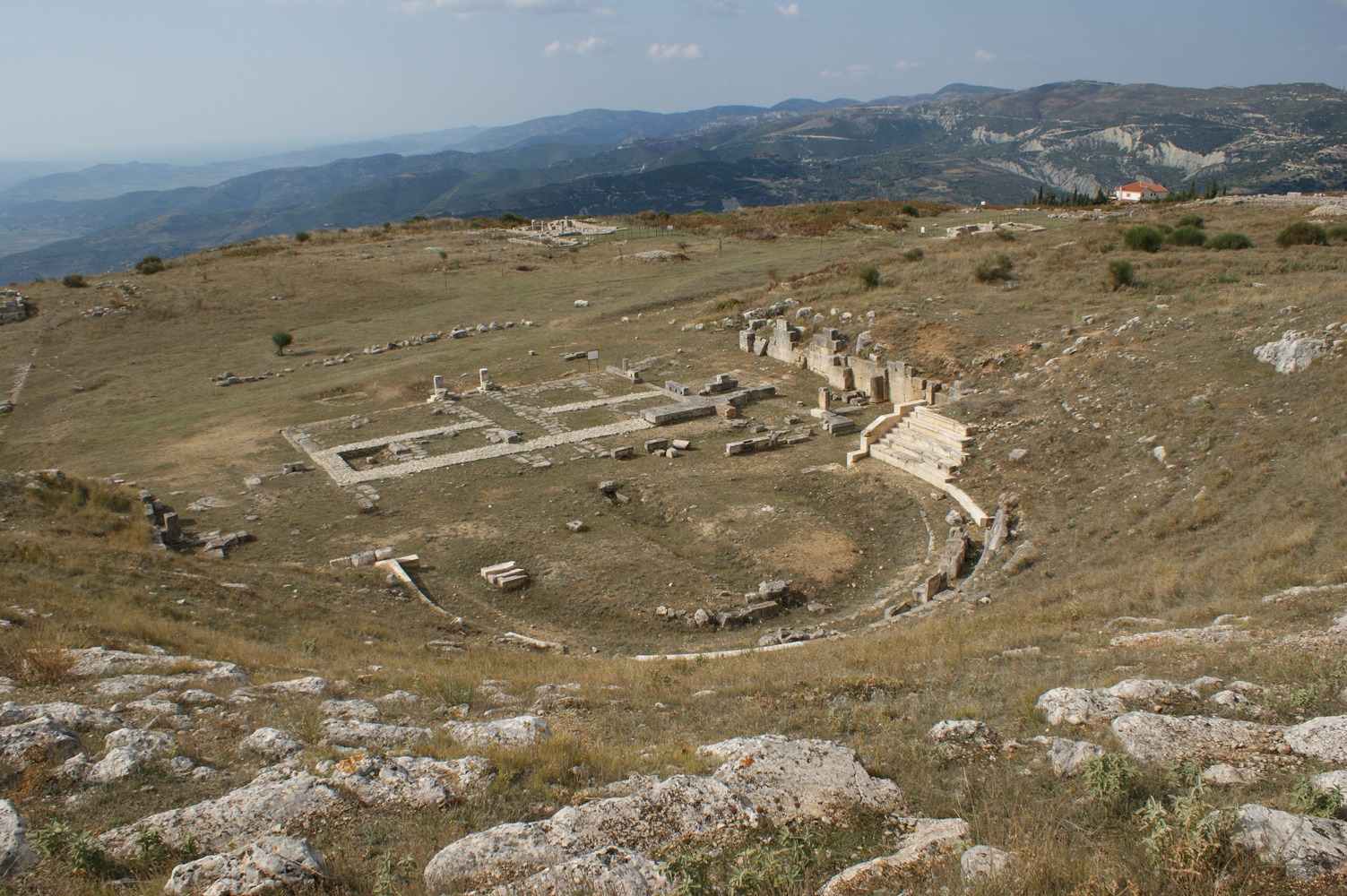
Theater

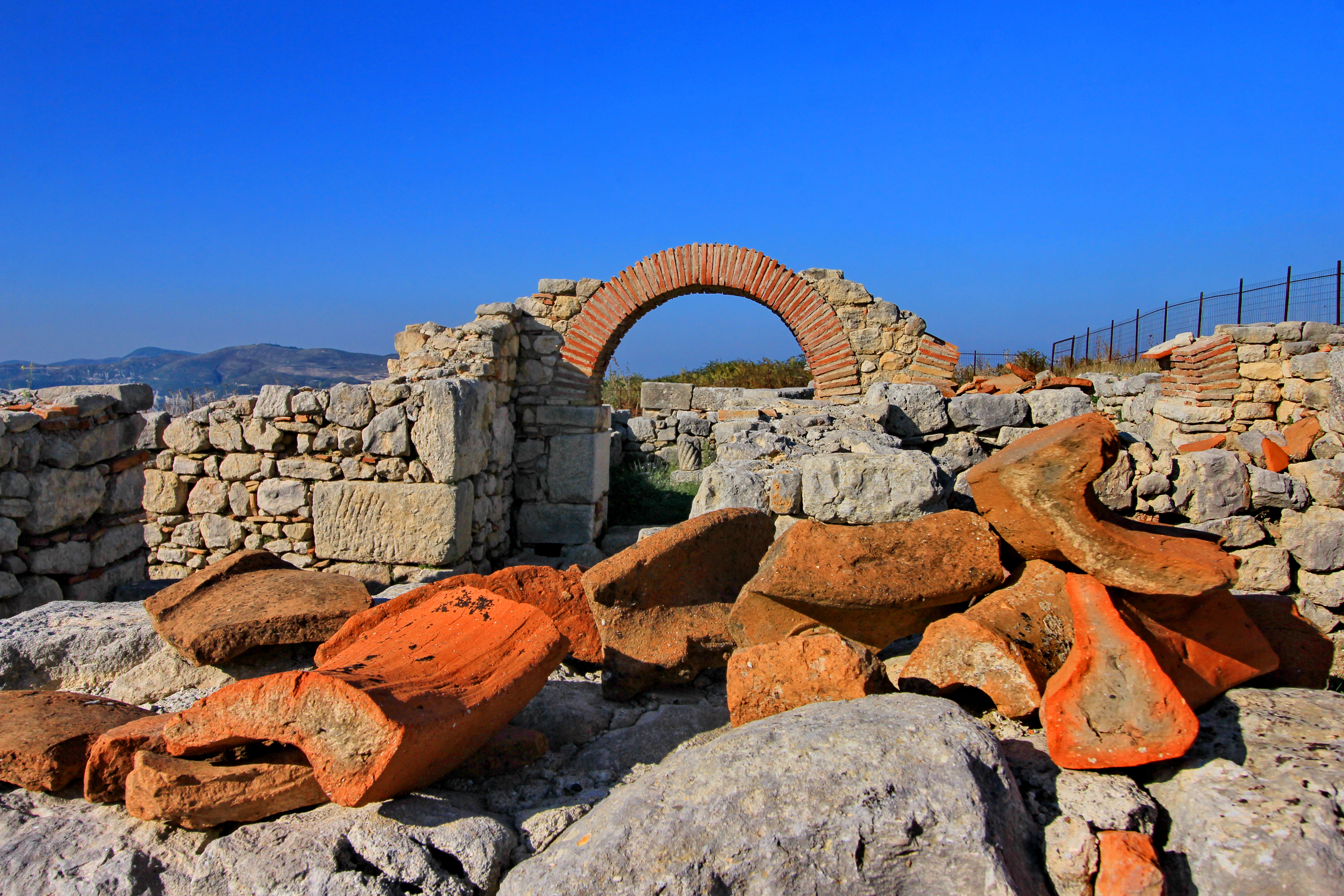
Ruins

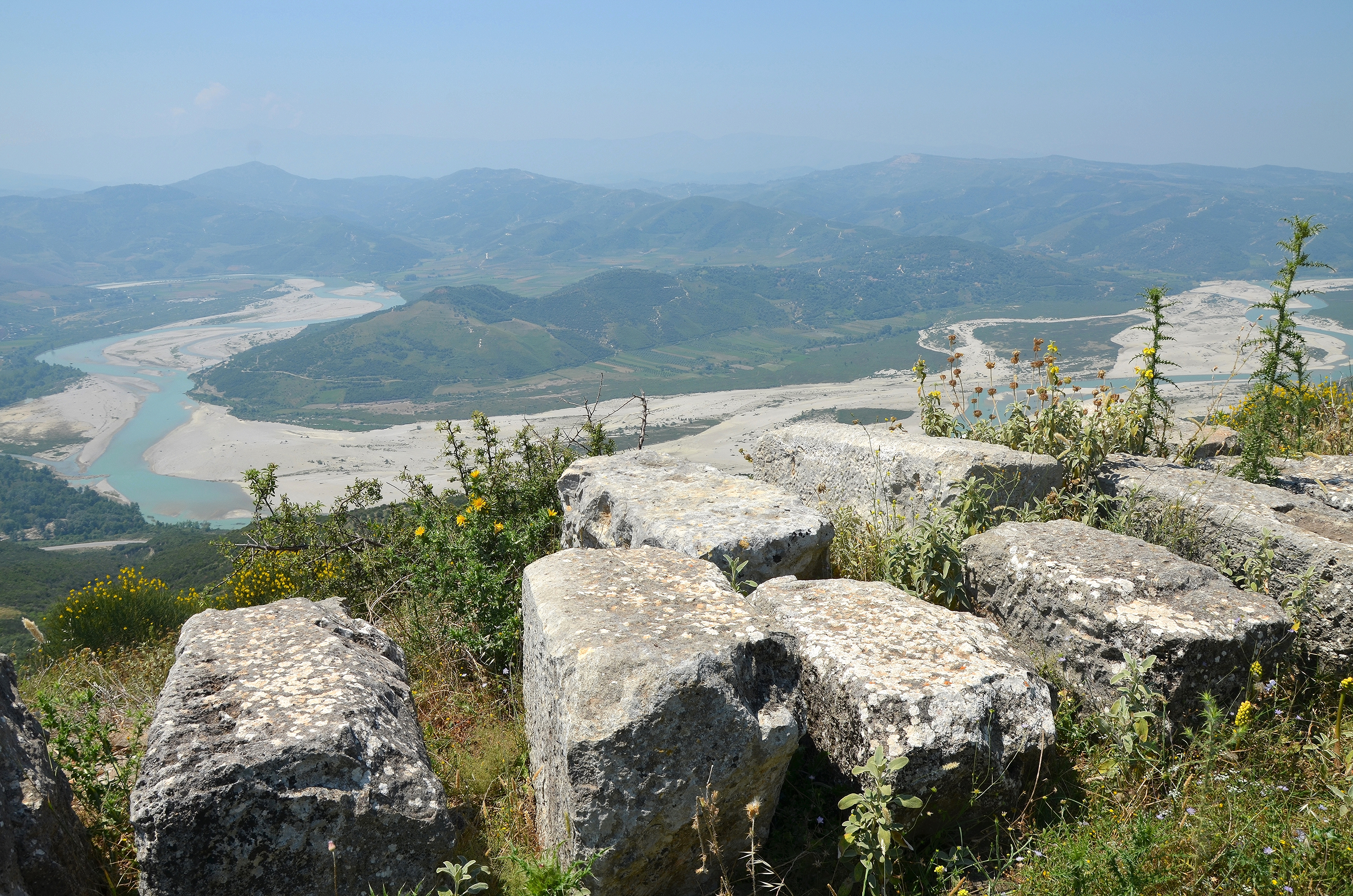
View from the remains

== See also ==
- List of settlements in Illyria
- Tourism in Albania

== Bibliography ==
- Beaudry, Nicolas, Chevalier, Pascale (2020). 'Les espaces domestiques et économiques du groupe épiscopal protobyzantin de Byllis (Albanie)', Archaeology of a World of Changes. Late Roman and Early Byzantine Architecture, Sculpture and Landscapes, Oxford, pp. 201–218.
- Beaudry, Nicolas (2010). 'Një punishte për prodhimin e verës në Bylisi', Monumentet 28, pp. 41–50.
- Beaudry, Nicolas, Chevalier, Pascale, & Muçaj, Skënder (2010). 'Le quartier épiscopal, campagne 2009, Byllis (Albanie)', Bulletin du Centre d'études médiévales d'Auxerre 14, pp. 57–60.
- Beaudry, Nicolas, et al. (2003). 'Byllis (Albanie)', Bulletin de correspondance hellénique 126.2, pp. 659–684.
- Bejko, Lorenc; Morris, Sarah; Papadopoulos, John; Schepartz, Lynne (2015). The Excavation of the Prehistoric Burial Tumulus at Lofkend, Albania. ISD LLC. ISBN 978-1938770524.
- Belli Pasqua, Roberta (2014). "Nuove ricerche per lo studio e la valorizzazione di Byllis (Albania)". In Salvatore Nuzzo; Gregorio Andria; Pietro Camarda (eds.). Contributi di Ricerca 1 - Research Contributions 1: 1° Workshop sullo stato dell'arte delle ricerche nel Politecnico di Bari [1st Workshop on the State of the Art and Challenges of Research Efforts at POLIBA]. Gangemi Editore spa. ISBN 978-88-492-9976-2.
- Belli Pasqua, Roberta (2017). Lavarone, Massimo (ed.). "Ricerca archeologica e valorizzazione: riflessioni sul Parco Archeologico di Byllis (Albania)". Quaderni Friulani di Archeologia (XXVII). Società Friulana di Archeologia: 89–97. ISSN 1122-7133.
- Bowden, William (2003). Epirus Vetus: The Archaeology of a Late Antique Province. Duckworth. ISBN 0-7156-3116-0.
- Cabanes, Pierre (1976). L'Épire: De la mort de Pyrrhos à la conquête romaine, 272-167 av. J.-C (in French). Paris: Annales Littéraires de l'Université de Besancon.
- Ceka, Neritan (1992). "Santuari dell'area illirico-epirotica". In Stazio, Attilio; Ceccoli, Stefania (eds.). La Magna Grecia e i grandi santuari della madrepatria: atti del trentunesimo Convegno di studi sulla Magna Grecia. Atti del Convegno di studi sulla Magna Grecia (in Italian). Vol. 31. Istituto per la storia e l'archeologia della Magna Grecia. pp. 123–126.
- Ceka, Neritan; Muçaj, Skënder (2005). Byllis, its history and monuments. Tirana.
- Ceka, Olgita (2012). "Il koinon e la città. L'esempio di Byllis". In G. de Marinis; G.M. FabriniG. Paci; R. Perna; M. Silvestrini (eds.). I processi formativi ed evolutividella città in area adriatica. BAR International Series. Vol. 2419. Archaeopress. pp. 59–64. ISBN 978-1-4073-1018-3.
- Ceka, Neritan; Ceka, Olgita (2018). "The treatment of public space in the preroman cities of Southern Illyria and Epirus (Vth-Ist centuries B.C.)". In Jean-Luc Lamboley; Luan Perzhita; Altin Skenderaj (eds.). L'Illyrie Méridionale et l'Épire dans l'Antiquité – VI. Actes du VI e colloque international de Tirana(20 – 23 mai 2015). De Boccard. pp. 977–990. ISBN 978-9928-4517-3-6.
- Chevalier, P.; Mucaj, S.; Raynaud, M.-P.; Sodini, J.-P. (2019). Byllis: Presentation du site, fortifications, basiliques A, C et D. Recherches Archeologiques Franco-Albanaises. Vol. 3. ISD LLC. ISBN 9782869584549.
- Chevalier, Pascale; Beaudry, Nicolas (2018). "Une ville du VIe siècle retournant à la ruralité : désurbanisation et abandon du siège épiscopal de Byllis". In Jean-Luc Lamboley; Luan Përzhita; Altin Skënderaj (eds.). L'Illyrie méridionale et l'Épire dans l'Antiquité: Actes du VIe colloque international de Tirana, 20-23 mai 2015. Vol. 6. De Boccard. pp. 435–448. ISBN 9789928451712.
- Chevalier, Pascale, et al. (2003). 'Trois basiliques et un groupe épiscopal des Ve-VIe siècles réétudiés à Byllis (Albanie)', Hortus Artium Medievalium 9, pp. 155–165.
- Chevalier, Pascale, et al. (2008). 'Byllis (Albanie), campagne 2007: le quartier épiscopal, la Basilique E et les carrières', Bulletin du Centre d'études médiévales d'Auxerre 13, pp. 73–76.
- Chevalier, Pascale, Beaudry, Nicolas, & Muçaj, Skënder (2009). 'Le quartier épiscopal, campagne 2008, Byllis (Albanie)', Bulletin du Centre d'études médiévales d'Auxerre 13, pp. 73–76.
- Fiedler, M.; Lahi, B.; Shehi, E.; Pánczél, S.-P.; Velo, K.; Döhner, Gregor (2021). "Ausgrabungen in der Kleinsiedlung Babunjë bei Apollonia (Albanien) Bericht zu den Kampagnen 2018–2019". Mitteilungen des Deutschen Archäologischen Instituts, Römische Abteilung. 127: 110–144.
- Hammond, N. G. L. (1989). "The Illyrian Atintani, the Epirotic Atintanes and the Roman Protectorate". The Journal of Roman Studies. 79: 11–25. doi:10.2307/301177. JSTOR 301177. S2CID 162831458.
- Haxhimihali, Marin (2004). 'Byllis et sa région à la lumière des sources écrites du VIe siècle', L'Illyrie méridionale et l'Épire dans l'Antiquité IV, Paris, pp. 463–466.
- Hansen, Mogens Herman; Nielsen, Thomas Heine (2004). An Inventory of Archaic and Classical Poleis. Oxford University Press. ISBN 978-0-19-814099-3.
- Hatzopoulos, M. B.; Sakellariou, M.; Loukopoulou, L. D. (1997). Epirus, Four Thousand Years of Greek History and Civilization. Ekdotike Athenon. ISBN 960-213-377-5.
- Hodges, Richard (2021). "Seeking salvation at Byllis in the 6th century". Journal of Roman Archaeology. Cambridge University Press: 1–7. doi:10.1017/S1047759421000660. S2CID 250284278.
- Hoti, Afrim (2022). "Dyrrhachium bizantina e il suo territorio (VI-VIII sec.)". In Sonia Antonelli; Vasco La Salvia; Maria Cristina Mancini; Oliva Menozzi; Marco Moderato; Maria Carla Somma (eds.). Archaeologiae Una storia al plural: Studi in memoria di Sara Santoro. Archaeopress Publishing Ltd. pp. 245–250. ISBN 9781803272979.
- Jaupaj, Lavdosh (2019). Etudes des interactions culturelles en aire Illyro-épirote du VII au III siècle av. J.-C (Thesis). Université de Lyon; Instituti i Arkeologjisë (Albanie).
- Lasagni, Chiara (2019). Le realtà locali nel mondo greco: Ricerche su poleis ed ethne della Grecia occidentale. Studi e testi di epigrafia. Edizioni dell'Orso. ISBN 978-88-6274-962-6.
- Lippert, Andreas; Matzinger, Joachim (2021). Die Illyrer: Geschichte, Archäologie und Sprache. Kohlhammer Verlag. ISBN 9783170377103.
- Lewis, D. M.; Boardman, John (1994). The Cambridge Ancient History, Volume 6: The Fourth Century BC. Cambridge University Press. ISBN 0-521-23348-8.
- Papadopoulos, John (2016). "Komai, Colonies and Cities in Epirus and Southern Albania: The Failure of the Polis and the Rise of Urbanism on the Fringes of the Greek World". In Molloy, Barry P.C. (ed.). Of Odysseys and Oddities: Scales and Modes of Interaction Between Prehistoric Aegean Societies and their Neighbours. Oxbow Books. pp. 435–460. ISBN 978-1-78570-232-7.
- Stocker, Sharon R. (2009). Illyrian Apollonia: Toward a New Ktisis and Developmental History of the Colony.
- Wilkes, John (1995). The Illyrians. Wiley-Blackwell. ISBN 0-631-19807-5.
- Winnifrith, Tom J. (2002). Badlands-borderlands: a history of Northern Epirus/Southern Albania. London. ISBN 0-7156-3201-9 – via Duckworth.
