= Damës =

Damës may refer to the following places in Albania:

- Damës, Fier, a village in the municipality of Mallakastër, Fier County
- Damës, Gjirokastër, a village in the municipality of Memaliaj, Gjirokastër County
