= Nikaia, Illyria =

Ancient settlement in Albania

Coordinates: 40°32′25″N 19°44′15″E

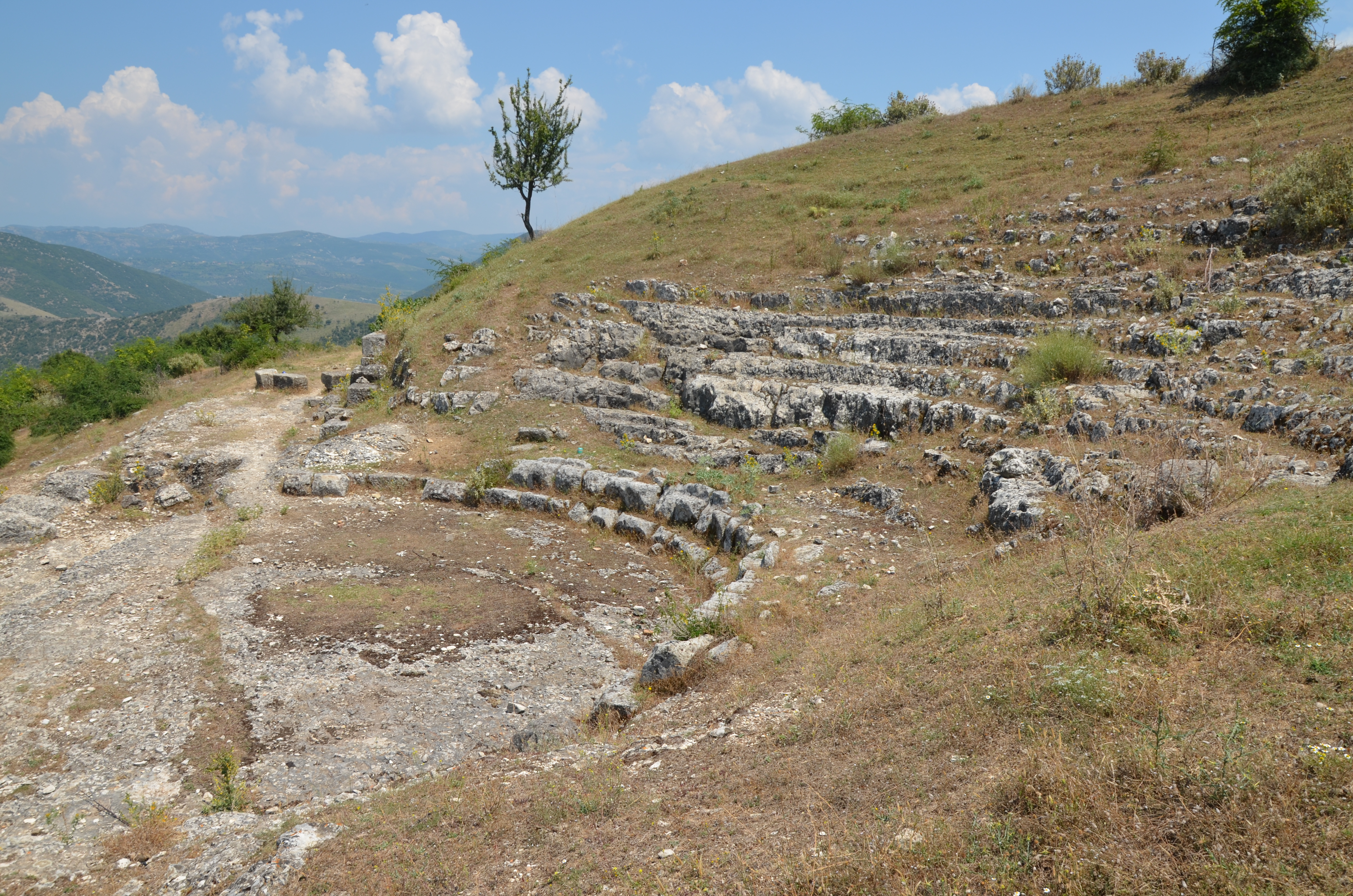

Nikaia (Greek: Νίκαια, Latin: Nicaea) was a settlement of the koinon of the Bylliones, an Illyrian tribe that through contact with their Ancient Greek neighbours became bilingual. The tribe was found in southern Illyria (today's Fier District, southern Albania).

== Name ==
The toponym Νίκαια (Nikaia) is recorded by Stephanus of Byzantium (fl. 6th century AD). The name of the settlement is of Greek etymology.

== History ==
Sources from the classical era point to a location in the vicinity of Byllis. It has been identified c. 1,500 meters south of Byllis in the modern settlement of Klos, near Fier. Archaeologist Neritan Ceka led the expedition. Its size, organization and administrative relation to Byllis are debated. It was too large to be a kome and had walled fortifications in the 5th and 4th centuries BC. Stephanus of Byzantium is the only primary source who calls it a polis (πόλις ἐν ’Ιλλυριδι, pólis en ’Illyridi). The city plan resembles that of Amantia. After the foundation of Nikaia, Byllis went into decline, however it was not completely abandoned.

Papazoglou and Hammond also stressed that the development of Nikaia as a city wasn't part of the beginning of the development of an "Illyrian city" system. Rather, Nikaia like other settlements in southern Illyria (Byllis, Amantia, Lissus etc.) represents the adoption of the Greek city model by the 4th century BC or later in an indigenous settlement. Papazoglou states that Nikaia together with nearby Byllis were "Greek foundations on barbarian territory".

== Organisation and onomastics ==
Inscriptions at both Byllis and Nikaia begin in the middle of the 4th century BC and are related to a polis-like organization. They are exclusively in Greek, as are institutions, the gods worshiped, the titles of the officials and other parts of the organization of the settlement. Those inscriptions are written in fluent Greek and reveal typical features of the north-western Greek dialect.

The Gods worshipped in Nikaia as well as Byllis are the typical deities of the Greek Pantheon: Zeus Tropaios, Hera Teleia, Poseidon, Parthenos, (Note: Several goddesses in the Greek Pantheon had the epithet Parthenos ("virgin"), including Artemis, Athena, Hera and Persephone.) etc.

The vast majority of the corpus of names is Greek (Alexander, Andriscus, Archelaus, Kebbas, Maketa, Machatas, Nikanor, Peukolaos, Phalakros, Philotas, Drimakos and Alexommas) with a few Illyrian names. According to Hatzopoulos, the latter exceptions can't challenge the initial Greek character of the local element. A 2nd-century BC inscription in a festival in Boetia, mentions an Illyrian contestant, Byllion from Nikaia (Βυλλίων απο Νίκαιας). This inscription indicates that the city was a member of the Koinon of the Bylliones.

The political institutions were typical of the Greek polis though it is difficult to define their precise content. A Hellenistic inscription records a strategos eponymos (Greek: Στρατηγός επώνυμος) a general of the Koinon of the Bylliones. The term Koinon did not necessarily refer to an ethnos. As a term it was also used to refer to a coalition of settlements, in this case: Byllis and Nikaia to which it was restricted. Fanoula Papazoglou considered Nikaia to have been a deme of Byllis.

== See also ==
- List of ancient cities in Illyria
