= Bylliones =

Illyrian people

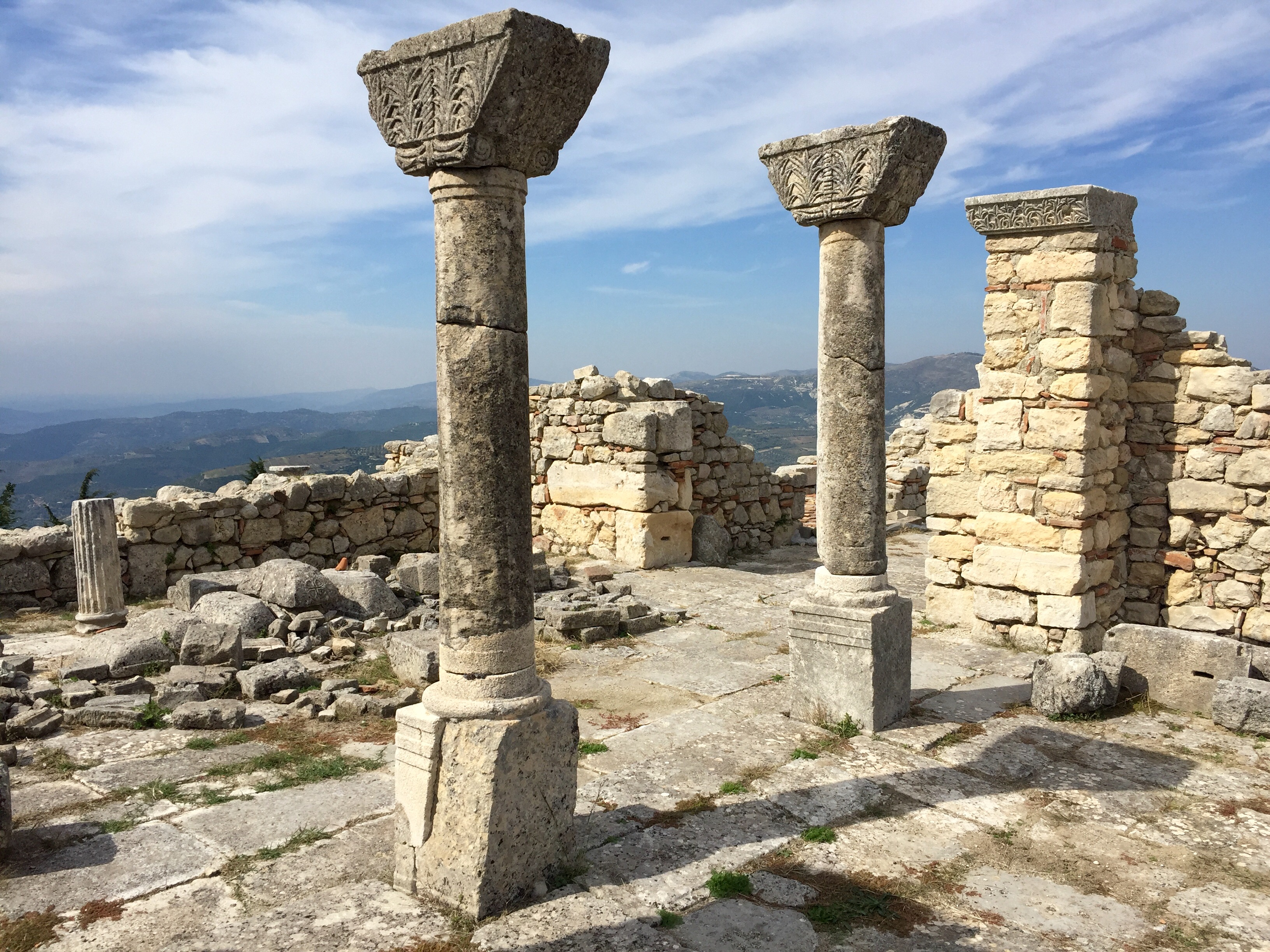
Byllis, the chief city and one of the two centres of the koinon of the Bylliones.

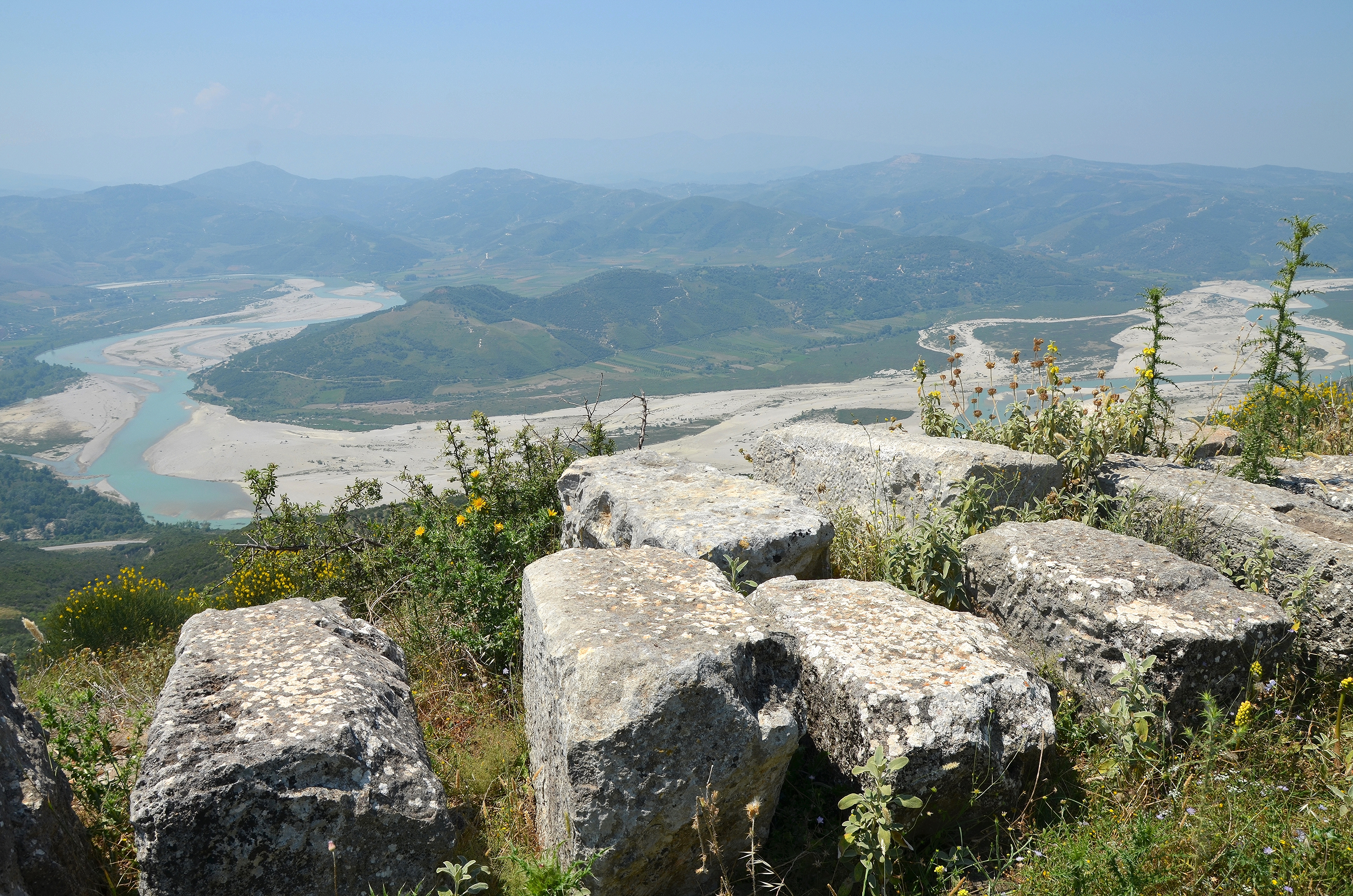
View towards the Vjosa valley from Byllis.

The Bylliones (Ancient Greek: Βυλλίονες) were an Illyrian tribe that lived near the Adriatic coast of southern Illyria (modern Albania), on the lower valley of the Vjosa river, in the hinterland of Apollonia. The Bylliones were firstly attested in epigraphic material from the oracle of Dodona dating back to the 4th century BC, and their koinon was firstly attested in a 3rd-century BC inscription from the same oracle. Their territory was trapezoidal on the right side of the rivers Luftinje and Vjosa, extending in the west to the Mallakastra mountains. The chief city of their koinon was Byllis. Another important centre of their koinon was Klos, an earlier Illyrian settlement later called Nikaia, as an inscription attests. The Bylliones also inhabited in the area of an ancient sanctuary of the eternal fire called Nymphaion.

Through contact with their Greek neighbours, in Hellenistic times the Bylliones acquired a certain degree of Hellenization and bilingualism, especially in the urban centres of their koinon. In Hellenistic times their koinon minted coins as attested by inscriptions reporting their ethnicon in Greek letters. The koinon of the Bylliones survived until Roman Imperial times. In the Roman era, the Bylliones reappear in the late 1st century CE when they are mentioned by Pliny the Elder in the Natural History (c. 79 CE) as one of the "barbarian" tribes which lived in the area of Nymphaeum. The koinon of the Bylliones and the koinon of the Amantes were the most notable Illyrian koina.

== Name ==
Their name is recorded as Boulinoi by Pseudo-Scymnus (404), Boulimeis by Dionysius Periegetes (386), Ballini by Livy (44. 30), Bylliones by Strabo (7. 7. 8), Buliones by Pliny (3. 21/139). Bronze coins dating back to the period 230 BC – 148 BC have been found in the site of Byllis, bearing the legend ΒΥΛΛΙΟΝΩΝ.

== Geography ==
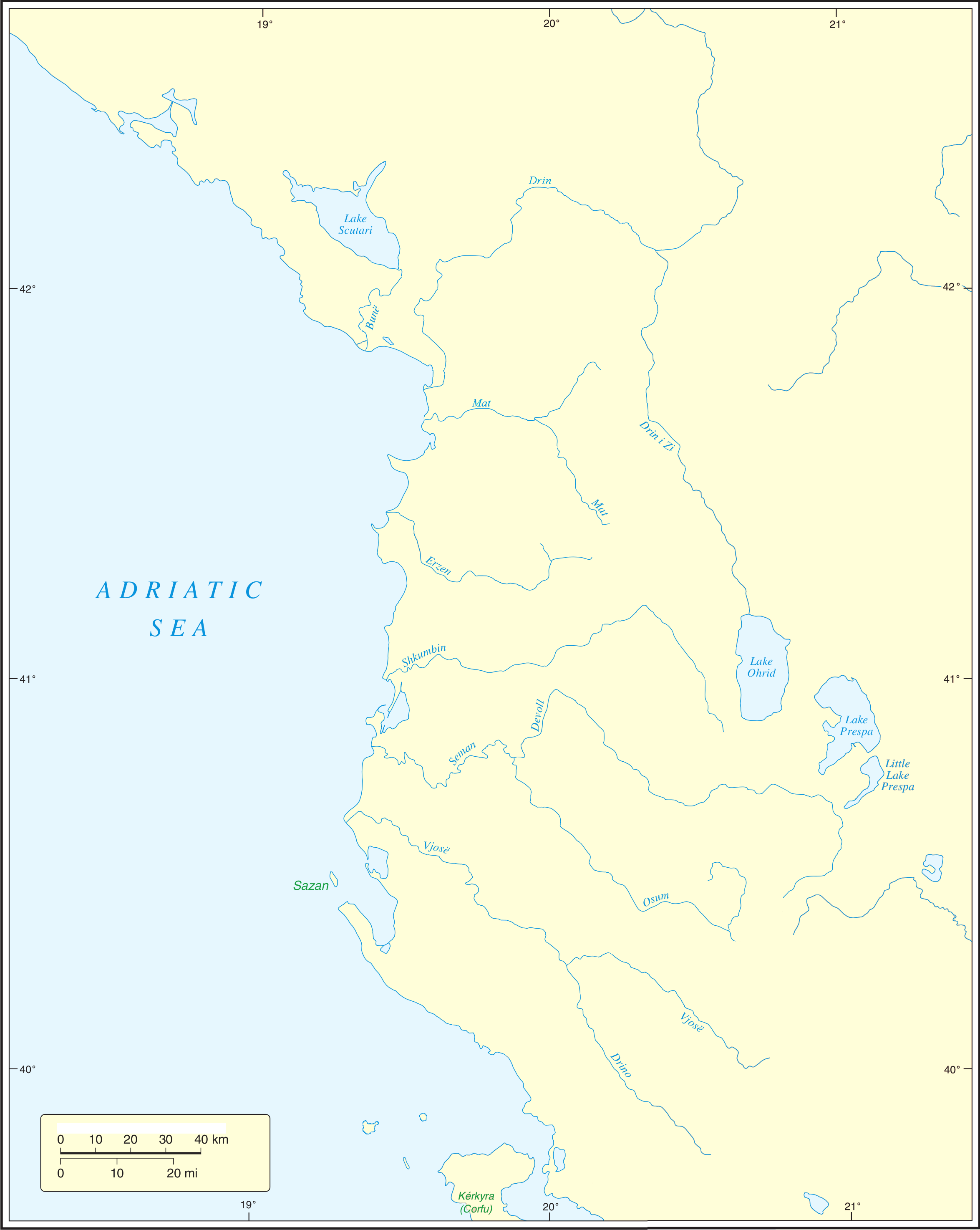

There is not a certain geographic extension of the community of the Bylliones, whose territorial and ethnic institution is documented to have existed since the 5th-4th century BC, as evidenced by epigraphic material from the oracle of Dodona. Byllis seems to have constituted the main center of the Bylliones. Another important center of the Bylliones was Klos, a more ancient Illyrian settlement later called Nikaia, as an inscription attests. The Bylliones formed a koinon, which was firstly attested in a 3rd-century BC inscription, also this time from Dodona. Livy (1st century BC) called their territory Bullinum agrum.

Byllis foundation is traditionally attributed to the middle of the 4th century BC, when the Illyrian massive walls were built. Its urban layout seems to have been structured around the middle of the 3rd century BC. It was built on a roughly 500 m hill on the right bank of the Vjosa river, one of the main river axes of central-southern Albania. The hill had a dominant view over the river's valley, and today's Mallakastra region, over much of which the koinon of the Bylliones stretched. The site permitted also to see the coastline while, towards the hinterland, the more internal centers.

The territory of the Bylliones was composed by a whole network of fortifications constructed to protect them from nearby Apollonians in the west and Atintanians in the east. It was delimited to the southeast by the fortifications of Rabije and Matohasanaj. The koinon of the Amantes was located on the opposite coast of the Vjosa river. The proximity of the prehistoric burial tumulus at Lofkënd to both Byllis and Nymphaion indicates that the tumulus was located in the territory of the Bylliones.

Although still unproven, some scholars have suggested that the Bylliones may have once constituted a part of Atintania, which may have overshadowed with its name the koinon of Bylliones, and perhaps even the Amantes, in the ancient accounts during the years 230–197 BC. Despite the important place it occupied behind Apollonia, the community of the Bylliones was not mentioned, for instance, either in the treaty between Philip V of Macedon and Hannibal in 215 BC, nor in the terms of peace submitted to Philip V by the Aetolians in 208 BC, and neither in the Peace of Phoenice in 205 BC, when historical accounts report only Atintanes and Atintanina. It has been suggested that about 224 BC, when Atintania separated from Rome but remaining outside the dominion of the Illyrian dynast Demetrius of Pharos, the westernmost part of Atintanes began to organize themselves as a separate unit with the name "koinon of Bylliones", holding the support of the Epirote League. A koinon of the Bylliones is attested in epigraphic material from Dodona that has been dated about the last decades of the 3rd century BC. This koinon was most probably restricted to a southern Illyrian, non-Greek speaking, region without including parts of Epirus.

== Culture ==
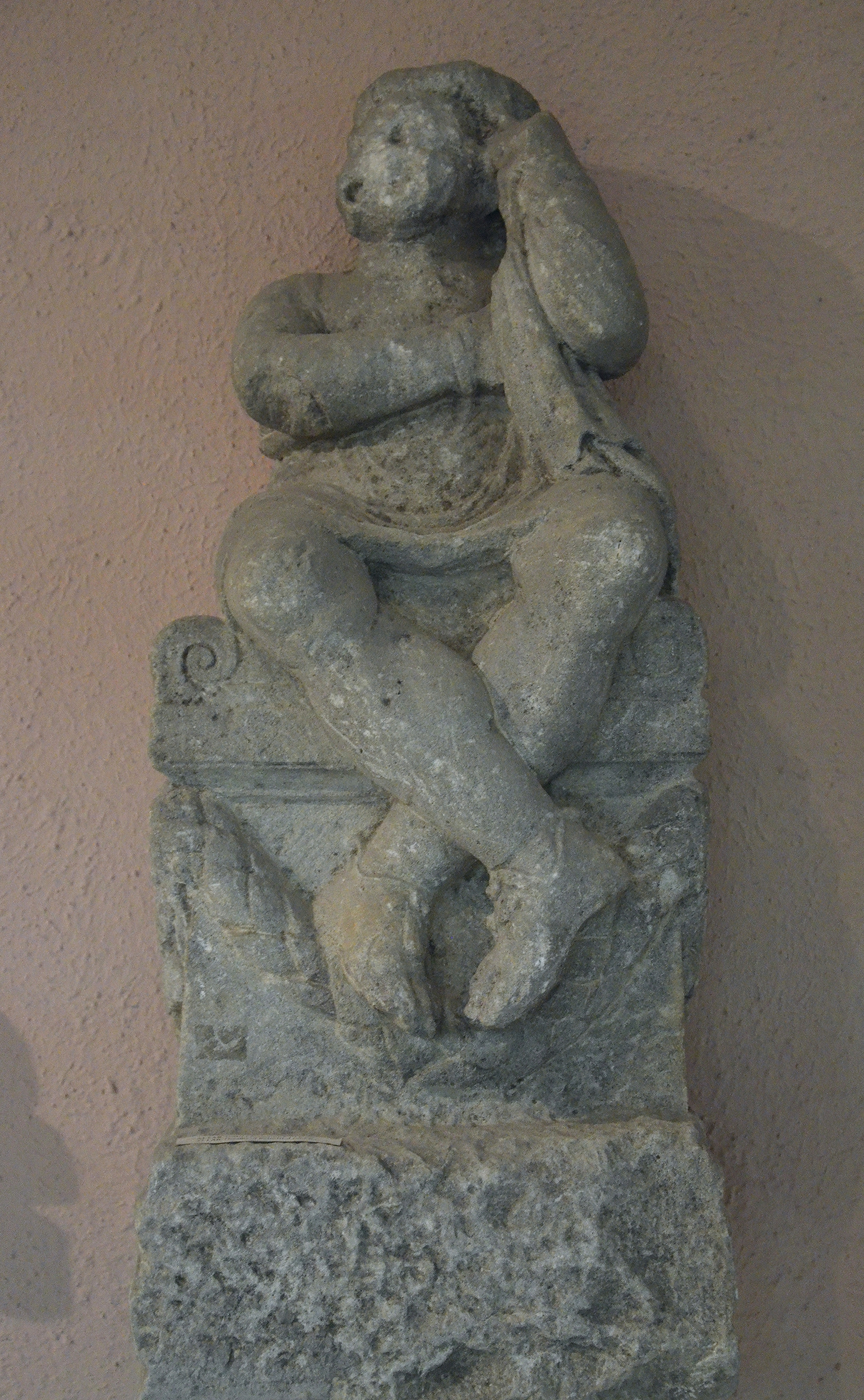
Comic actor playing the role of a slave seated on the altar of Dionysus, 2nd half of the 3rd century BC, from the theatre of Byllis. National Museum of Archaeology, Albania.

=== Language ===
The idiom spoken by the Bylliones belonged to the southeastern Illyrian linguistic area. Through contact with their Greek neighbours, in Hellenistic times the Bylliones acquired a certain degree of Hellenization and bilingualism, especially in the urban centres of their koinon. In the earliest inscriptions found in the territory of the Bylliones that date to the 3rd century BCE all the personal names of the administrative figures are Illyrian, being members of the indigenous community in a still initial phase of the acculturation process. Illyrian onomastics is still present in the administrative inscriptions of the 3rd-2nd centuries BC, but there is an interference of names from nearby Apollonians, which show the progress in the acculturation process of the indigenous population. The time duration that passed before Illyrian cities like Byllis were documented on a list of theorodokoi, which occurred around 220-189 BCE, clarifies that acculturation did take place in southern Illyria, however it indicates that the process was gradual.

After the Roman annexation of the region in 167 BCE, the large urban centres of the Bylliones were abandoned, except Byllis. During the Roman period the Greek language previously used in the inscriptions found in the centres of the koinon of the Bylliones was replaced by Latin, showing the establishment of the new Roman administration. A Roman colony was established in Byllis around the time of Augustus, called Colonia Iulia Byllidensium. The tribe of the Bylliones is still described as "barbarian" by Pliny the Elder in the 1st century CE.

=== Religion ===
Archaeological explorations have not yet found a sanctuary or temple in the city of Byllis, however, a series of inscriptions show the adoption of the cults of Zeus, Hera, Dionysius and Artemis. Another inscription indicates that the area included a fire sanctuary with an oracle, the Nymphaion located on the border with nearby Apollonia. The nymphaeum also appears as a fire symbol engraved on coins of Byllis minted in the 3rd-2nd century BC. A relief found near Byllis also shows the nymphs and a cloth wrapped around this fire, a scene that is repeated only with the nymphs depicted on a 1st-century BC silver coin of Apollonia, suggesting an admixture of local traditions and religions with the forms and practices brought by Greek colonists. Under Greek influence the local Illyrian spontaneous and naturalistic cult started its canonization. In the sanctuary of Dodona a 4th-century BC inscription on a lead foil reports Bylliones asking to which deity they should sacrifice in order to ensure the safety of their possessions. By the end of the 3rd century BC, the Bylliones appear among the lists of theorodokoi at Delphi.

=== Hellenistic political organisation ===
One of the earlier inscriptions in the territory of the Bylliones, which dates back to the second half of the 3rd century BC and which was found on the fortification of Rabie, provides evidence for the institution of territorial control by the central authority of the Bylliones, through an army of border guards, the peripoloi, commanded by the peripolarchos and assisted by a grammateus. All the personal names of these figures are Illyrian and provide evidence for an administration made up of members of the indigenous community in a still initial phase of the acculturation process. The prytanis, a magistrate figure, was adopted from nearby Apollonia originally introduced in the region under the influence of its metropolis Corinth, and it appeared as an eponymous official in several inscriptions found in the territory of the Bylliones. The earliest of these inscriptions dates back to the mid-3rd century BC and was found in Klos. Both the strategos and the prytanis were the main magistrates of the central power, with the former being second to the latter. It was similar to the strategos in the hierarchy of magistrates of the Epirote League, but different from Apollonia, where the prytanis was followed by the commander of the archers, the toxarchos. The importance of the strategos highlights the existence of a militarized community among the Bylliones.

== Economy ==
The koinon of the Bylliones minted its own coins in the period between 230 BC and 148 BC.

== See also ==
- List of ancient tribes in Illyria

== Bibliography ==
- Bejko, Lorenc; Morris, Sarah; Papadopoulos, John; Schepartz, Lynne (2015). The Excavation of the Prehistoric Burial Tumulus at Lofkend, Albania. ISD LLC. ISBN 978-1938770524.
- Belli Pasqua, Roberta (2017). Lavarone, Massimo (ed.). "Ricerca archeologica e valorizzazione: riflessioni sul Parco Archeologico di Byllis (Albania)". Quaderni Friulani di Archeologia (XXVII). Società Friulana di Archeologia: 89–97. ISSN 1122-7133.
- Brodersen, Kai (2017). "Barbaren bei Plinius d. Ä und seinem „affen" Solinus: Vom kulturbezogenen zum geographischen Barbarenbegriff". In Bermejo-Barrera, Jose Carlos (ed.). Desmoì philías = Bonds of friendship : studies in ancient history in honour of Francisco Javier Fernández Niet. University of Barcelona. ISBN 978-84-9168-043-7.
- Cabanes, P. (1997). "Development of the Settlements". In M. V. Sakellariou (ed.). Ηπειρος: 4000 χρόνια ελληνικής ιστορίας και πολιτισμού. Ekdotike Athenon. ISBN 9789602133712.
- Cabanes, Pierre (2002) [1988]. Dinko Čutura; Bruna Kuntić-Makvić (eds.). Iliri od Bardileja do Gencia (IV. – II. stoljeće prije Krista) [The Illyrians from Bardylis to Gentius (4th – 2nd century BC)] (in Croatian). Translated by Vesna Lisičić. Svitava. ISBN 953-98832-0-2.
- Ceka, Neritan (1990a). "Fortifikimet antike të bashkësisë byline / Les fortifications antiques du koinon des Bylliones" [The ancient fortifications of the koinon of the Bylliones]. Iliria. 20 (1): 99–146. doi:10.3406/iliri.1990.1562.
- Ceka, Neritan (1990b). "Periudha paraqytetare në trevën byline / La période proto-urbaine dans la région des Bylliones" [The proto-urban period in the Bylliones region]. Iliria. 20 (2): 137–160. doi:10.3406/iliri.1990.1573.
- Ceka, Neritan (1992). "Santuari dell'area illirico-epirotica". In Stazio, Attilio; Ceccoli, Stefania (eds.). La Magna Grecia e i grandi santuari della madrepatria: atti del trentunesimo Convegno di studi sulla Magna Grecia. Atti del Convegno di studi sulla Magna Grecia (in Italian). Vol. 31. Istituto per la storia e l'archeologia della Magna Grecia. pp. 123–126.
- Ceka, Neritan (2009). "Atintanët: një rivështrim mbi territorin dhe historinë e tyre / Les Atintanes, un nouvel aperçu de leur territoire et de leur histoire". Iliria. 34: 5–23. doi:10.3406/iliri.2009.1078.
- Ceka, Olgita (2012). "Il koinon e la città. L'esempio di Byllis". In G. de Marinis; G.M. FabriniG. Paci; R. Perna; M. Silvestrini (eds.). I processi formativi ed evolutividella città in area adriatica. BAR International Series. Vol. 2419. Archaeopress. pp. 59–64. ISBN 978-1-4073-1018-3.
- Ceka, Olgita (2022). "La trasformazione di Byllis da centro del koinon in colonia Iulia Byllidensium". In Perna, Roberto; Carmenati, Riccardo; Giuliodori, Marzia; Piccinini, Jessica (eds.). Roma e il mondo adriatico: dalla ricerca archeologica alla pianificazione del territorio. ΠΛΕΩΝ ΕΠΙ ΟΙΝΟΠΑ ΠΟΝΤΟΝ, Collana di studi di archeologia e storia del Mediterraneo. Vol. 2 (part 2). Edizioni Quasar. pp. 839–852. ISBN 978-88-5491-235-9.
- Ceka, Neritan; Ceka, Olgita (2018). "The treatment of public space in the preroman cities of Southern Illyria and Epirus (Vth-Ist centuries B.C.)". In Jean-Luc Lamboley; Luan Perzhita; Altin Skenderaj (eds.). L'Illyrie Méridionale et l'Épire dans l'Antiquité – VI. Actes du VI e colloque international de Tirana(20 – 23 mai 2015). De Boccard. pp. 977–990. ISBN 978-9928-4517-3-6.
- Hammond, N. G. L. (1991). "The "Koina" of Epirus and Macedonia". Illinois Classical Studies. 16 (1/2): 183–192. ISSN 0363-1923. JSTOR 23064357.
- Hammond, N. G. L. (1992). "The Relations of Illyrian Albania with the Greeks and the Romans". In Winnifrith, Tom (ed.). Perspectives on Albania. New York: St. Martin’s Press. pp. 29–39. ISBN 9780333512821.
- Hammond, N. G. L. (1994). Collected Studies: Alexander and his successors in Macedonia. A.M. Hakkert.
- Hansen, Mogens Herman; Nielsen, Thomas Heine (2004). An Inventory of Archaic and Classical Poleis. Oxford University Press. ISBN 0-19-814099-1.
- Jaupaj, Lavdosh (2019). Etudes des interactions culturelles en aire Illyro-épirote du VII au III siècle av. J.-C (Thesis). Université de Lyon; Instituti i Arkeologjisë (Albanie).
- Lasagni, Chiara (2019). Cresci Marrone, Giovannella; Culasso Gastaldi, Enrica (eds.). Le realtà locali nel mondo greco: Ricerche su poleis ed ethne della Grecia occidentale. Studi e testi di epigrafia. Edizioni dell'Orso. ISBN 978-88-6274-962-6.
- Lippert, Andreas; Matzinger, Joachim (2021). Die Illyrer: Geschichte, Archäologie und Sprache. Kohlhammer Verlag. ISBN 9783170377103.
- Morgan, Catherine (2018). The Returning Hero: Nostoi and Traditions of Mediterranean Settlement. Oxford University Press. ISBN 978-0-19-253941-0.
- Šašel Kos, Marjeta (2005). Appian and Illyricum. Narodni muzej Slovenije. ISBN 961616936X.
- Shehi, Eduard (2015). Terra sigillata en Illyrie méridionale et en Chaonie: importations et productions locales (IIe S. AV. J.-C. -IIe S. AP. J.-C.). Col·lecció Instrumenta (in French). Vol. 48. Barcelona: Universitat de Barcelona, Publicacions i Edicions. ISBN 978-84-475-4238-3.
- Shipley, Graham, ed. (2019). Pseudo-Skylax's Periplous: The Circumnavigation of the Inhabited World: Text, Translation and Commentary (2 ed.). Oxford University Press. ISBN 9781789624977.
- Shpuza, Saimir (2022). La Romanisation de l'Illyrie méridionale et de la Chaônie. Collection de l'École française de Rome. Publications de l’École française de Rome. ISBN 9782728310982.
- Stocker, Sharon R. (2009). Illyrian Apollonia: Toward a New Ktisis and Developmental History of the Colony.
- Verčík, Marek; Kerschbaum, Saskia; Tušlová, Petra; Jančovič, Marián; Donev, Damjan; Ardjanliev, Pero (2019). "Settlement Organisation In The Ohrid Region". Studia Hercynia (XXIII/1): 26–54.
- Winnifrith, Tom J. (2002). Badlands-borderlands: a history of Northern Epirus/Southern Albania. London: Duckworth. ISBN 0-7156-3201-9.
