= Ballsh =

- Administrative unit
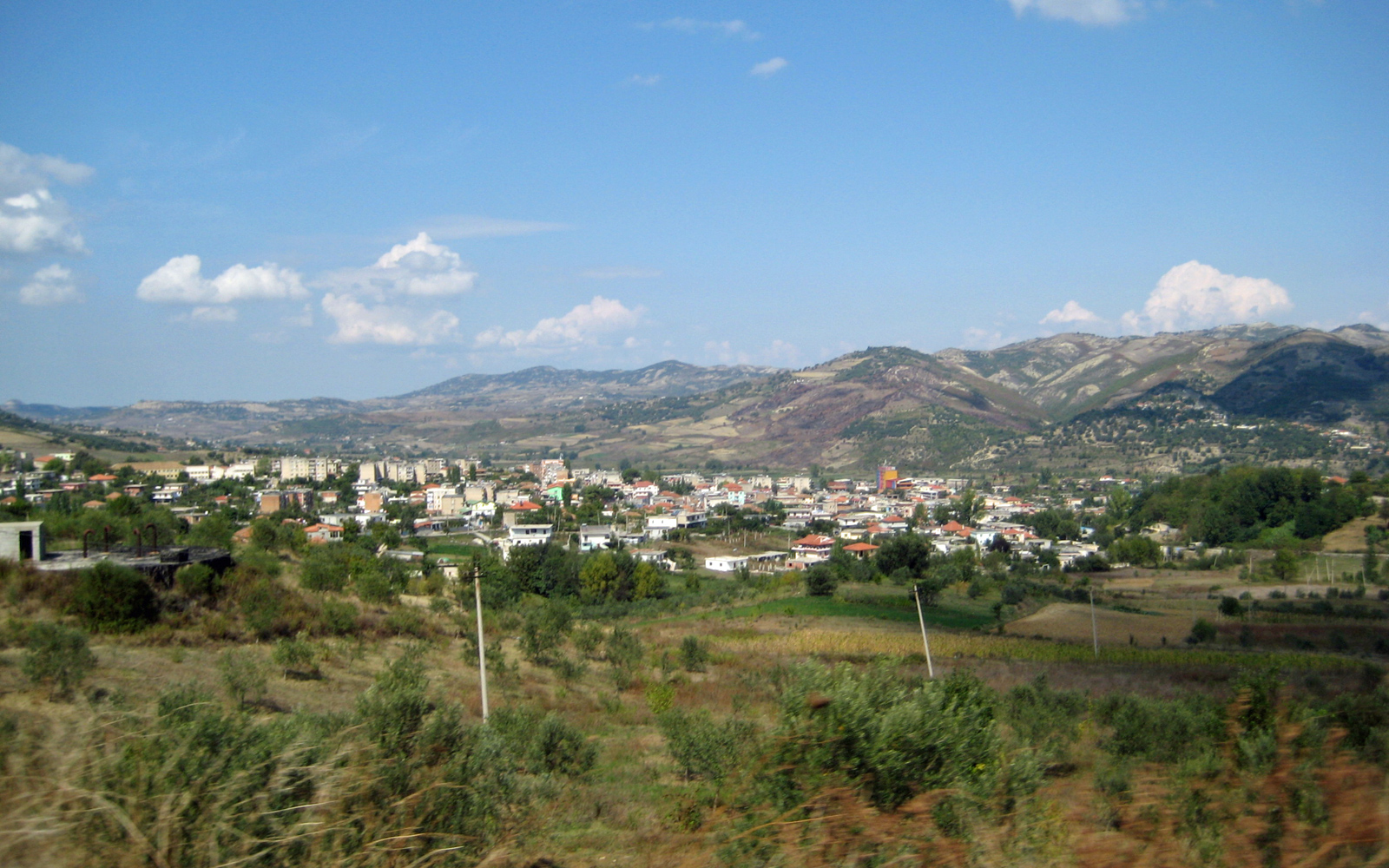
- Ballsh in the Distance

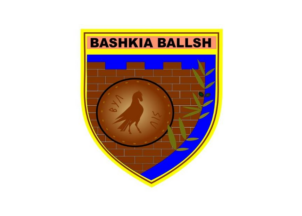
- Flag Emblem

- Location within Albania
- Coordinates: 40°36′3″N 19°44′11″E
- Country: Albania
- County: Fier
- Municipality: Mallakastër
- Elevation: 231 m (758 ft)

Population (2011)
  - Administrative unit: 7,657
- Time zone: UTC+1 (CET)
  - Summer (DST): UTC+2 (CEST)
- Postal Code: 9308
- Area Code: 0313
- Website: www.bashkiamallakaster.gov.al

Ballsh (Albanian definite form: Ballshi) is a town and a former municipality in Fier County, southern Albania. At the 2015 local government reform it became a subdivision and the seat of the municipality Mallakastër. It was the seat of the former District of Mallakastër. The population at the 2011 census was 7,657.

== Name ==
It was centre of Malkasra (Turkish of "Mallakastër") kaza in Sanjak of Berat in Yanya Vilayet during Ottoman rule between 1670 and 1912. Its name evolved from the name of the ancient town Byllis, located in proximity of Ballsh. Church sources report the variants Byllis, Bellis, Ballis and Vallis.

== History ==
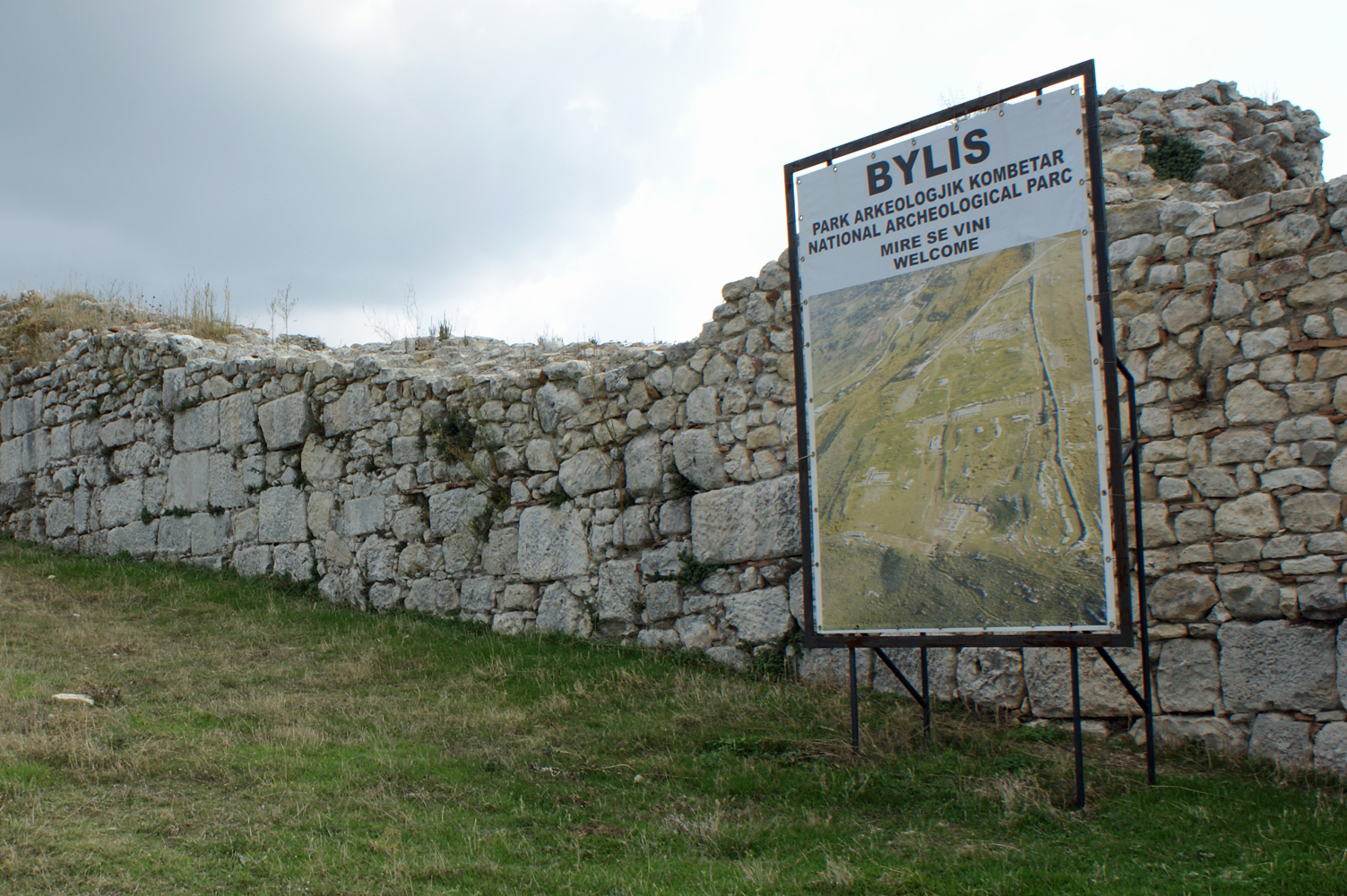
Byllis Archaeological Park

Ballsh is close to the ancient city of Byllis, a city during the Illyria era. The Slavic invasions of the 6th and 7th centuries caused the decline of Byllis while Ballsh was built with materials plundered from Byllis.

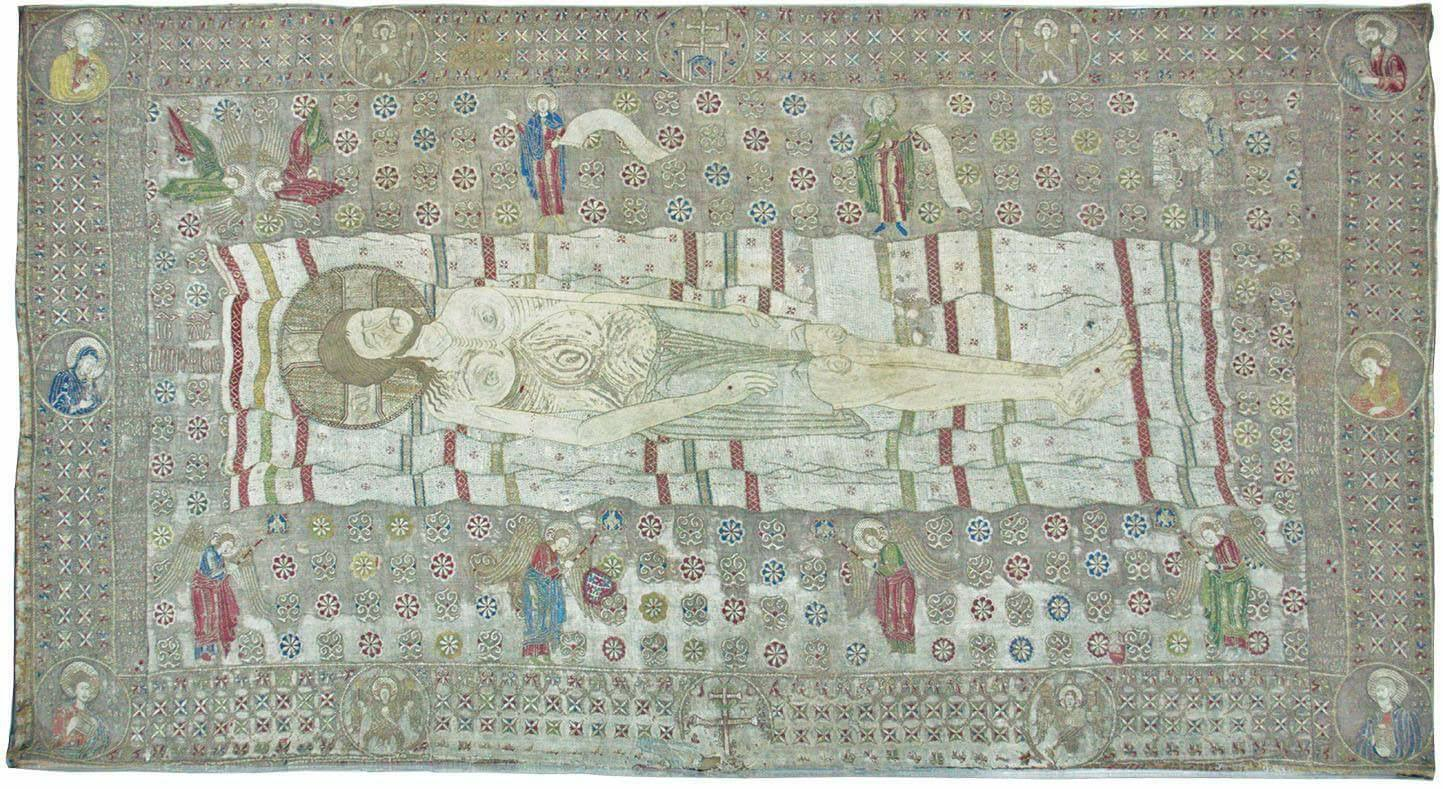
Epitaph of Gllavenica made by Monk Savia from Ballsh Commissioned by Gjergj Arianiti in 1373.

== Economy ==
The city's surrounding fields are rich in crude petroleum and are dotted by a series of oil wells established during the socialist era. Only a fraction of these wells are operating today, but the city includes a working refinery, and outputs of naphthas are significant.

The refinery was owned by Taçi Oil through ARMO (Anika Mercuria Refinery Associated Oil, owned by Anika Enterprises). In 2013 ARMO was sold to Heaney Assets Corporation, an Azerbaijan corporation.

== Sports ==
The city's team KS Bylis Ballsh, plays at the Adush Muça Stadium.

== See also ==
- Ballshi inscription
- Epitaph of Gllavenica
