= Greshicë =

- Administrative unit
- Location within Albania
- Coordinates: 40°33′N 19°47′E
- Country: Albania
- County: Fier
- Municipality: Mallakastër

Population (2011)
  - Administrative unit: 1,152
- Time zone: UTC+1 (CET)
  - Summer (DST): UTC+2 (CEST)

Greshicë is a village and a former municipality in the Fier County, southwestern Albania. At the 2015 local government reform, it became a subdivision of the municipality Mallakastër. The population as recorded in the 2011 census was 1,152.

== History ==
In 1847, Albanian rebels under Rrapo Hekali defeated Ottoman forces in Greshicë during the Albanian revolt of 1847 executing Isuf Bey Vrioni and his brother.
