= Damës, Fier =

Damës
- Village
- Location within Albania
- Coordinates: 40°30′44″N 19°48′40″E
- Country: Albania
- County: Fier
- Municipality: Mallakastër
- Administrative unit: Fratar
- Time zone: UTC+1 (CET)
  - Summer (DST): UTC+2 (CEST)

Damës (Albanian definite form: Damësi) is a village in and the seat of the former Fratar municipality, Fier County, Albania. At the 2015 local government reform it became part of the municipality Mallakastër.
