= Nymphaion (fire sanctuary) =

Illyrian sanctuary

Nymphaion (Ancient Greek: Νυμφαῖον, Nymphaîon) was the name given to the ancient sanctuary of the "eternal fire" located in southern Illyria, notably near Apollonia, in modern-day Albania. The location also featured bitumen mines, which, still functioning today, have held a crucial role throughout the history of the region.

Placed inland on the Vjosë/Aoos river, the area was occupied by Illyrians since before archaic colonial times, and the site was likely already a place of worship because of its peculiar physical properties. Attested local tribes of the area were the Bylliones and the Amantes. In the 7th–6th century BCE Apollonia was founded on the Illyrian coast near this site by a joint colony of Corinth and Kerkyra. According to ancient literary tradition the fire of the sanctuary never went out before an ancient war fought between Apollonia and the Illyrians. Around mid-5th century BCE, after conquering nearby Thronion, Apollonia consolidated its control over the site of the fire sanctuary and the area of the bitumen mines. Until the Apollonian conquest, the control of the bitumen mines may have produced in part the wealth of Thronion.

The ancient site has been identified with the Selenica area, across from Byllis, a region rich in natural reserves of petroleum and gas, which were required to feed the eternal fire. Selenicë is still a modern producer of hydrocarbons and high quality bitumen.

== Description ==
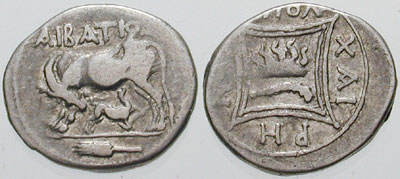
A 3rd century BCE coin from Apollonia depicting the eternal fire of the nymphaion.

The area had already been occupied by Illyrians before the founding of nearby Apollonia by a joint colony of Corinth and Kerkyra in the 7th–6th century BCE, and the site was likely already a place of worship because of its peculiar physical properties. The sanctuary of the "eternal fire" was also linked to an oracle. It probably passed to Apollonia at the time of the Apollonian victory towards Thronium (5th century B.C). An inscription found in Byllis, the chief city of the Bylliones, indicates the presence of the sanctuary with an oracle in the area. The presence of the fire sanctuary in the area is also attested in numismatics. The fire of the nymphaion is depicted on a bronze coin of Apollonia minted in the second half of the 4th century BCE, on coins of Byllis minted in the 3rd-2nd century BCE, and in many other local coins depicting the fire surrounded by nymphs.

In his description of the site Strabo (1st century BCE – 1st century CE) reports that a fire arises from a stone, and underneath it exists a source of warm water and asphalt. Pliny the Elder (1st century CE), in his description based on the accounts of historian Theopompus (4th century BCE), reports that even if the fire is located in the middle of a thick forest, it is very pleasant because it does not damage the greenery that surrounds it and the always lit crater of the nymphaion is located near a source of cold water. Pliny reports a public form of divination according to which the welfare of the Apolloniates was connected to the steadiness of the fire spring. He also gives the geographical position of the fire sanctuary: on the border of Apollonia, where the barbarians Amantini and Bylliones lived. Cassius Dio (2nd–3rd centuries CE) reports a description of the fire sanctuary including the practices related to the oracle provided by the great fire, giving a more detailed explanation of a private form of divination:

“What I have marveled at above all is that a great fire issues from the earth near the Aoös River and neither spreads much over the surrounding land nor sets on fire even the place where it dwells nor dries it out, but has grass and trees flourishing close by. In pouring rains, it increases and rises high. For this reason it is called a nymphaion, and provides an oracle in this way: you take incense and after making whatever prayer you wish, cast it in the fire to carry the prayer. And if your wish is to be fulfilled, the fire accepts it readily, and even if it falls outside, runs out, snatches the incense and burns it up. But if the wish is not to be fulfilled, the fire does not go to it, but even if the incense is carried near, it recedes and flees. It acts in this way with regard to all matters except death and marriage; concerning these, one is absolutely not permitted to inquire.”

— Cassius Dio (41.45).

Dio also expressed in other accounts his wonder at the greenness and moistness of the site in spite of the presence of its fire.

The fire sanctuary was associated with the cult of the nymphs. A relief found near Byllis shows the nymphs and a cloth wrapped around the fire of the nymphaion. A similar scene is also represented on a 1st-century BCE silver coin of Apollonia that depicts three nymphs dancing around the fire of the nymphaion. Of very ancient origin, the indigenous Illyrian cult of the nymphs influenced Apollonia. The continuation of the cult of the nymphs in the Roman imperial period in Apollonia is testified in a 2nd-century CE Greek inscription reporting Illyrian names.

In addition to the natural home of the nymphs, the site was also considered a beautiful, lush spot attractive to satyrs. According to a tale reported by Plutarch (1st–2nd century CE) in his Life of Sulla, a satyr fell asleep beside the nymphaion. The creature was captured there and brought to Sulla. The satyr was then questioned through many interpreters, but he was able to make only a horse cry. Disgusted by that sound, Sulla sent him away.

== See also ==
- Enji (deity)
- Vatër

== Bibliography ==
- Anamali, Skënder (1992). "Santuari di Apollonia". In Stazio, Attilio; Ceccoli, Stefania (eds.). La Magna Grecia e i grandi santuari della madrepatria: atti del trentunesimo Convegno di studi sulla Magna Grecia. Atti del Convegno di studi sulla Magna Grecia (in Italian). Vol. 31. Istituto per la storia e l'archeologia della Magna Grecia. pp. 127–136.
- Bejko, Lorenc; Morris, Sarah; Papadopoulos, John; Schepartz, Lynne (2015). The Excavation of the Prehistoric Burial Tumulus at Lofkend, Albania. ISD LLC. ISBN 978-1938770524.
- Bereti, Vasil; Quantin, François; Cabanes, Pierre (2011). "Histoire et épigraphie dans la région de Vlora (Albanie)". REA. 113 (1).
- Cancik, Hubert; Schneider, Helmuth; Salazar, Christine F.; Orton, David E. (2002). Brill's New Pauly: Encyclopaedia of the Ancient World. Antiquity. Vol. 9. Brill. ISBN 9004122729.
- Ceka, Neritan (1992). "Santuari dell'area illirico-epirotica". In Stazio, Attilio; Ceccoli, Stefania (eds.). La Magna Grecia e i grandi santuari della madrepatria: atti del trentunesimo Convegno di studi sulla Magna Grecia. Atti del Convegno di studi sulla Magna Grecia (in Italian). Vol. 31. Istituto per la storia e l'archeologia della Magna Grecia. pp. 123–126.
- Ceka, Neritan; Ceka, Olgita (2017). "A Peripolarchos inscription from the castle of Matohasanaj". In Luan Përzhita; Ilir Gjipali; Gëzim Hoxha; Belisa Muka (eds.). New archaeological discoveries in the Albanian regions: proceedings of the international conference 30 - 31 January, Tirana 2017. Vol. 1. Botimet Albanologjike. Academy for Albanian Studies, Institute of Archaeology. pp. 488–508. ISBN 978-9928-141-71-2.
- Larson, Jennifer Lynn (2001). Greek Nymphs: Myth, Cult, Lore. New York: Oxford University Press. ISBN 978-0-19-514465-9.
- Pajón Leyra, Irene (2023). "Islands and their marvels as structural principle in the so-called historiographical section of the De mirabilibus auscultationibus". In Stefan Schorn, Robert Mayhew (ed.). Historiography and Mythography in the Aristotelian Mirabilia. Rutgers University Studies in Classical Humanities. Taylor & Francis. doi:10.4324/9781003437819-2. ISBN 9781000986105.
- Papadopoulos, John (2016). "Komai, Colonies and Cities in Epirus and Southern Albania: The Failure of the Polis and the Rise of Urbanism on the Fringes of the Greek World". In Molloy, Barry P.C. (ed.). Of Odysseys and Oddities: Scales and Modes of Interaction Between Prehistoric Aegean Societies and their Neighbours. Oxbow Books. pp. 435–460. ISBN 978-1-78570-232-7.
- Piccinini, Jessica (2013). "Rethinking Epirote Religion. A Survey of Recent Scholarship on Epirote Cults and Sanctuaries" (PDF). Annuario della Scuola Archeologica di Atene e delle Missioni Italiane in Oriente. III, 12. XC. Saia.
- Wilkes, J. J. (2000). "Map 49 Illyricum. Compiled by J.J. Wilkes, 1995". In Talbert, Richard J. A. (ed.). Barrington Atlas of the Greek and Roman World: Map-by-map Directory. Vol. 1. Princeton University Press. pp. 749–760. ISBN 0691049459.
