= Epitaph of Gllavenica =

14th-century Albanian Epitaph

- Epitafi i Gllavenicës
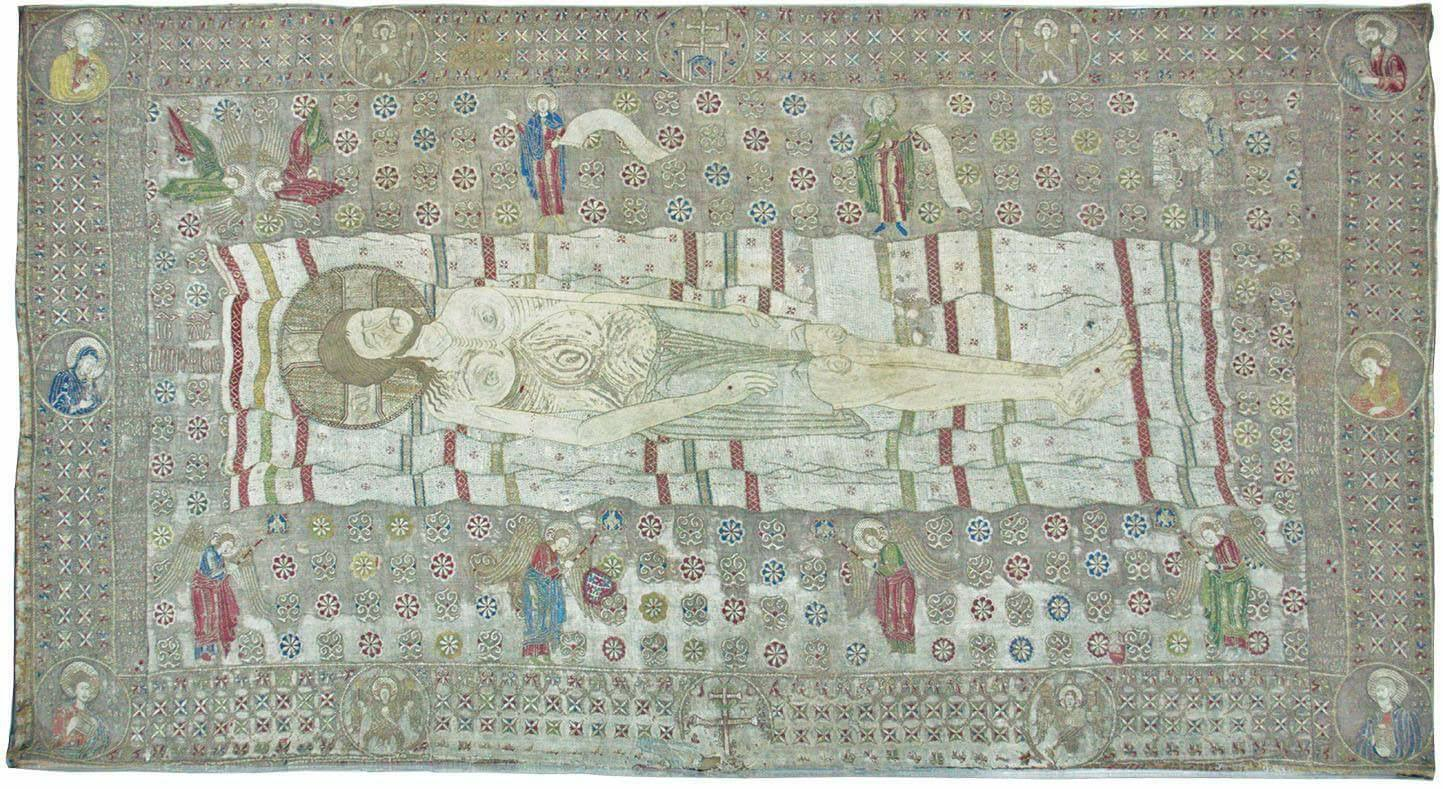
- The Epitaph of Gllavenica (1373), on display in Tirana
- Type: Liturgical textile (Epitaphios)
- Material: Silk, linen, silver-gilt thread (gold-washed silver), natural dyes
- Size: 212 × 114 cm (cloth); Christ figure: 126 × 23 cm
- Writing: Byzantine Greek
- Created: March 22, 1373, in Gllavenica (modern Ballsh) - commissioned by Bishop Kalist and Gjergj Arianiti; embroidered by Monk Savia
- Discovered: Ruins of a house near Ballsh, Albania
- Discovered by: Unknown; first studied by Theofan Popa
- Present location: National Historical Museum of Albania, Tirana
- Classification: Embroidered liturgical textile
- Identification: No. 1539
- Culture: Medieval Albanian Orthodox
- https://www.mhk.gov.al/en/en/gallery-2/

The Epitaph of Gllavenica (Albanian: Epitafi I Gllavenicës) is a medieval embroidered liturgical cloth, created on March 22, 1373, in the town of Gllavenica (modern Ballsh, Albania). It is a rare and valuable example of Albanian Orthodox religious art from the late Byzantine period. The epitaph depicts Christ lying on a burial shroud, surrounded by mourning figures and biblical prophets, embroidered in silk with silver-gilt threads and vibrant natural dyes. Commissioned by Bishop Kalist and the Albanian noble Gjergj Arianiti, and embroidered by Monk Savia, the epitaph is a prime example of medieval Albanian religious art. It was rediscovered near Ballsh and is now preserved in the National History Museum in Tirana.

== History ==
The Epitaph of Gllavenica was created on March 22, 1373, in the town of Gllavenica (modern Ballsh, Albania). It was commissioned by the Albanian noble Gjergj Arianiti and Bishop Kalist of Gllavenica and Berat, and crafted by Monk Savia. The cloth was created as a liturgical textile for Orthodox Good Friday ceremonies, depicting Christ’s burial with rich iconography embroidered in silk and silver-gilt thread. Originally, the epitaph belonged to the church of Gllavenica in Ballsh, a significant medieval ecclesiastical center.

According to local oral tradition, supported by scholar Theofan Popa, during the period of Bulgarian occupation of Albania, the bishops of Gllavenica-specifically Gorazhd and Angelar- were active in the area. Their relics, along with the epitaph, were moved from the Church of Gllavenica in Ballsh to the Church of the Dormition of the Virgin located inside Berat Castle for protection. The transfer was motivated by the decline of the church in Ballsh and the need to safeguard sacred objects.

In addition to the epitaph and relics, other ecclesiastical items such as liturgical books and parchments were part of this relocation. Initially, monks from the monastery moved these objects to the Monastery of Saint George in the village of Mbreshtan near Berat. However, during the Ottoman period, after the Islamization of Mbreshtan, the holy relics and the epitaph were brought back to the Church of the Dormition in Berat Castle, where they have remained safeguarded.

The relics of Gorazhd and Angelar still remain in the Cathedral of Saint Mary in Berat today, accompanied by icons and a Greek-written service honoring the saints. The veneration of these relics was significant for the local faithful, who regarded the saints as protectors of the city.

== Rediscovery and conservation ==
The Epitaph of Gllavenica was rediscovered in the mid-20th century in the cellar of a ruined house near Ballsh, where it had been folded and damaged by rodents and environmental factors. The researcher Theofan Popa was instrumental in its early study and gave the artifact its name based on Bishop Kalist’s ecclesiastical title linking it to the church of Gllavenica.

Restoration efforts began in 1974 under conservator Frederik Stamati, who treated stains from wax, soot, and damage caused by candles, smoke, and handling. That same year, the epitaph was exhibited internationally at the Petit Palais in Paris, where Byzantinist André Grabar described it as the third of its kind in Europe.

In 1980, following the opening of the Museum of Medieval Art in Korçë, concerned citizens of Berat, aware of their own valuable objects, proposed establishing a medieval museum in Berat. During a visit by leader Ramiz Alia, locals revealed that the epitaph was being stored improperly—wrapped and placed inside a chest. Recognizing the poor conditions, Alia ordered the epitaph to be transferred to Tirana for better preservation.

In 1981, the Epitaph of Gllavenica underwent a more extensive phase of conservation to prepare it for exhibition at the newly established National Historical Museum in Tirana. Conservators cleaned layers of soot that had built up over centuries and removed old fabric patches that had been added to its surface. The textile was then carefully mounted on a wooden board and sealed beneath a layer of transparent plexiglass. While it was first presented in a vertical position, it was later moved to a horizontal display case, where it continues to be preserved under protective conditions today.

In 2005, the National Historical Museum hosted the first international scholarly conference in Albania focused on the Epitaph of Gllavenica, highlighting its unique cultural value and addressing challenges in its conservation. The symposium featured contributions from experts including Moikom Zeqo, Frederik Stamati, Marta Jaro, and Jan Wouters, and led to the proposal of forming a multidisciplinary scientific board to develop a restoration plan.

== Iconography and inscription ==
The central image of the Epitaph of Gllavenica depicts Christ laid out in the tomb, measuring approximately 126 by 23 cm. His halo bears Greek letters, which means "He Who Is," symbolizing divinity and eternal existence. The halo’s diameter is about 24.5 cm. The wounds of the Crucifixion are clearly visible on Christ’s hands and feet, along with blood marks on his ribs. Above Christ’s head stands the Virgin Mary, shown mourning her deceased son, with a height of about 13.5 cm. At Christ’s feet is John the Theologian, also depicted as a young man, similarly mourning and leaning on his hand in sorrow.

The epitaph is embroidered on a rectangular fabric framed by a 14 cm wide border decorated with parallel rows of crosses arranged in pairs. At each corner of the cloth are the Four Evangelists—Matthew, Luke, Mark, and John-symbolizing the Gospels. Within the frame, alongside the Virgin Mary and John the Theologian, is the emblematic cross of Bishop Kalist of Gllavenica. The upper portion features prominent biblical figures such as the prophets Moses and Isaiah, and Joseph of Arimathea, each with their respective symbolic dimensions.

The epitaph features an embroidered inscription in Byzantine Greek, positioned on two vertical columns near Christ’s head and feet. This inscription dates the work precisely to March 22, 1373 (Byzantine year 6881) and credits Bishop Kalist of Gllavenica and Berati for commissioning the piece. It also acknowledges the significant patronage of the Albanian nobleman Gjergj Arianiti, whose name appears as the donor.

Top Inscription (Near Christ’s Head)

+Επ/ληπω/θη ω / πανσε/πτος / και θη/ος αε/πας της Υπερα/γίας Θε/οτοκου/ της ασα/ λευτου / δη εξο/δου και κο/που του πανη/εροτατου / επισκο/που Κα/ληστου / Γλαβεν/ γτζης / και Βελ(λ)αγραδον / εν μηνη/ μαρτιο / ΚΒ. /ετος ΣΤΩ/ΠΑ (6881=1373). _____________________________________________________________________________________________________________________________________ "It was completed (embroidered) this aeras (epitaph) of the Holy Theotokos with the expense and efforts of the most graceful bishop of Gllavenica and Berati, Kalisti, in March 22, 6881 (= 1373)".

Bottom Inscription (Near Christ’s Feet)

+Ζωης / ο κρατων φευ προς / θνησκης / απνους / νεκης / Επη / της αυ/θεντη/ας του / ηψηλο/τατων αυ/θεντων / Σερβη/ας και Πο/μανηας / και πας/ης Αλβανου / και αυτα/ δελφου / Γεωργηου / και Μπαλ/σα. / +Χειρ Γε/ωργηου / του Αρηαν/νητη και Χρι/ σοκλαβανη. _____________________________________________________________________________________________________________________________________ "You who own life, ah! How is a dead body which doesn’t breath? During the reign of high-ranking lords of Serbia, Romania and of entire Arbanon, brothers George and Balsha. By the hand of Gjergj Arianiti, the embroiderer".

The mention of the "high-ranking lords of Serbia, Romania, and of all Albania" refers to the regional power held during that time by the brothers Balsha II and Gjergj I Balsha who were rulers of the Balsha dynasty, who controlled power over territories stretching from Zeta (modern Montenegro & northern Albania) to parts of southern Albania, including Berat and Ballsh, where the church of Gllavenica was located.

The final phrase of the inscription-“by the hand of Gjergj Arianiti and the embroiderer”- created some debate amon scholars over the identity behind the word translated as "embroiderer" in the text. Some, like Dionis Papa and Ksenofon Ilia, interpret it as referring to Kristo Gllavari, reading the term not as a title but as a personal name. Others argue this is a mistranslation, noting that the original text uses a general descriptor for a gold-embroiderer rather than naming an individual. Theofan Popa supports the more widely accepted view that the epitaph was embroidered by the monk Savia, who, in keeping with monastic humility, left himself unnamed in the inscription.

== Theft and recovery ==
On February 3, 1994, the Epitaph of Gllavenica was stolen from the National Historical Museum in Tirana during a break-in by four individuals who had secretly remained in the building after hours. Along with the epitaph, several other valuable artifacts were taken, including icons and historical furnishings. The theft was discovered the following day by museum staff, who promptly notified authorities. Months later, on October 10, 1994, police apprehended Aleksandër Soto in connection with the crime. During the arrest, he attempted to discard one of the stolen icons by throwing it out a window, causing irreparable damage. In a court appearance, Soto admitted the group had intended to sell the artifacts and claimed they were unaware of the epitaph’s cultural significance at the time. After a lengthy investigation, the stolen items—including the Epitaph of Gllavenica-were recovered and officially returned to the museum on October 17, 1996, during a public ceremony led by museum officials.

== See also ==
- Arianiti family

== Bibliography ==
- Akademia e Shkencave e RPSH. Instituti i Ghuhësisë dhe i Letërsisë, Instituti i Historisë (2005). Studia Albanica Volume 38, Issue 2. Académie des sciences de la République Populaire d'Albanie, Institut d'histoire, Institut de linguistique et littérature.
- Koçi, Dorian (2021). An overview of National Historical Museum of Albania. National Historical Museum of Albania. ISBN 978-9-9284-6510-8.
- Koçi, Dorian; Bushi, Skënder; Llukani, Andrea (2018). Thesare të Muzeut Historik Kombëtar [Treasuries of National Historical Museum] (in Albanian). Muzeu Historik Kombëtar.
- Labi, Melsi (2016). The Basilica of Ballsh where Boris, the Bulgarian Tzar, was baptised. Association-Institute for English Language and American Studies.
- Labi, Melsi (2016a). Epitafi i Gllavenicës [Epitaph of Gllavenica] (in Albanian). Muzeu Historik Kombëtar.
