= Rrapo Hekali =

Albanian activist

Rrapo Hekali (?-1847) was an Albanian revolutionary born in Hekal, Mallakaster. He is famous for his role in Albanian revolt of 1847. After those events he was captured and prisoned by Ottoman forces. He died in the end of December 1847 in the Ottoman prison of Manastir. There are folk songs dedicated to him, including one collected by Thimi Mitko for his Albanian Bee.

== Sources ==
- Pollo, Stefanaq (1984), Historia e Shqipërisë: Vitet 30 të shek. XIX-1912 (in Albanian), Akademia e Shkencave e RPS të Shqipërisë, Instituti i Historisë, OCLC 165705732
