= Selitë Mali =

- Village
- Location within Albania
- Coordinates: 41°24′N 20°0′E
- Country: Albania
- County: Tirana
- Municipality: Tirana
- Administrative unit: Zall-Bastar
- Time zone: UTC+1 (CET)
  - Summer (DST): UTC+2 (CEST)

Selitë Mali is a village in the former municipality of Zall-Bastar in Tirana County, Albania. At the 2015 local government reform it became part of the municipality Tirana.

== Demographic history ==
The village of Selita appears in the Ottoman defter of 1467 as a small village in the timar of Bahadır in the nahiyah of Benda. The village had a total of three households represented by the following household heads: Peter Skura, Margjin Tanushi, and Gjergj Sykuqi.
