= Parthenos =

Parthenos (Greek: παρθένος 'virgin') may refer to:

- Virgin (title), an honorific bestowed on female saints and blesseds in Christianity
- Parthenos, the name of several maidens in the history of the naming of the constellation Virgo
- Parthenos, one translation of Hebrew almah
  - Isaiah 7:14, a verse in the bible
- Parthenos (butterfly)

== See also ==
- Artemis, in Greek mythology
- Athena, in Greek mythology
  - Athena Parthenos, a monumental sculpture
- Hestia, in Greek mythology
- Aeiparthenos, the perpetual virginity of Mary
- O Virgin Pure, a Greek Marian hymn
