= Hekal =

- Administrative unit
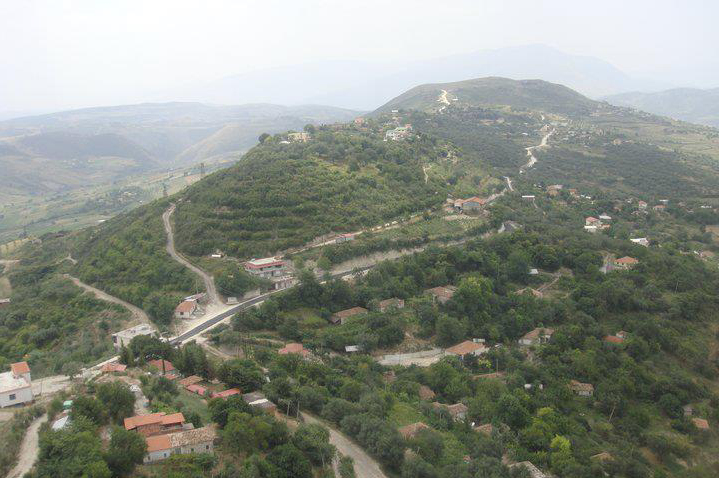

- Location within Albania
- Coordinates: 40°33′N 19°44′E
- Country: Albania
- County: Fier
- Municipality: Mallakastër

Population (2011)
  - Administrative unit: 2,623
- Time zone: UTC+1 (CET)
  - Summer (DST): UTC+2 (CEST)

Hekal is a village and a former municipality in the Fier County, southwestern Albania. At the 2015 local government reform it became a subdivision of the municipality Mallakastër. The population at the 2011 census was 2,623.

== Notable people ==
- Rrapo Hekali Albanian leader of the uprising of 1847
- Dervish Hekali Albanian hero.
