= Selitë, Tirana =

Neighbourhood of Tirana, Albania

Selitë
- Village
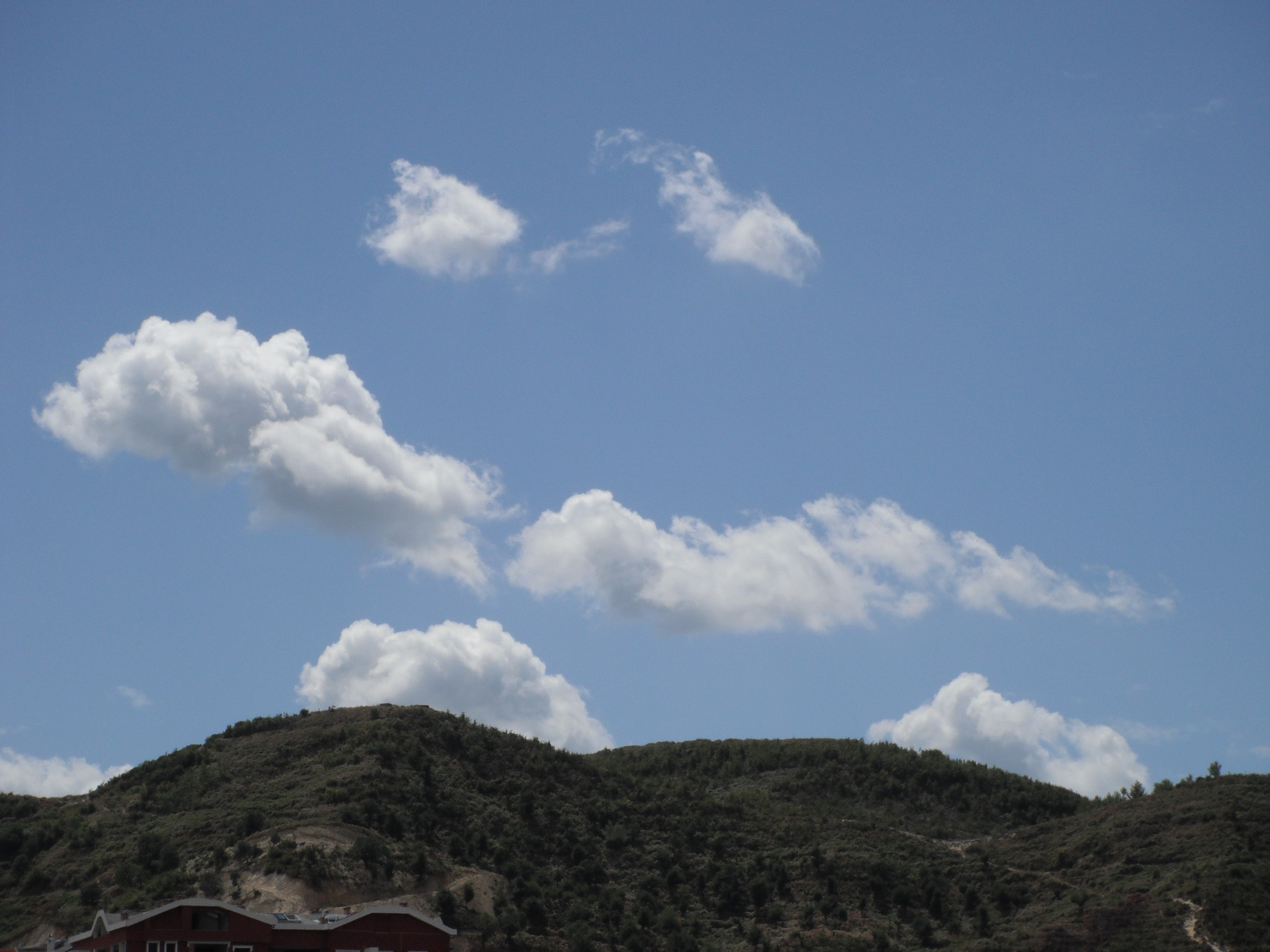
- The hills of Selitë

- Location within Albania
- Coordinates: 41°22′N 19°51′E
- Country: Albania
- County: Tirana
- Municipality: Tirana
- Administrative unit: Farkë
- Time zone: UTC+1 (CET)
  - Summer (DST): UTC+2 (CEST)

Selitë is a neighborhood of Tirana in the former municipality of Farkë in Tirana County, Albania. At the 2015 local government reform it became part of the municipality Tirana.

Selitë is divided into two parts, Big Selitë (Selita e Madhe) and Small Selitë (Selita e Vogël).

Population in municipality nr.5 ( where Selita is) is estimated to be around 80,000. Keep in mind that in the same municipality the neighbourhood of Komuna Parisit is also located.
