= Mallakastër =

- Municipality
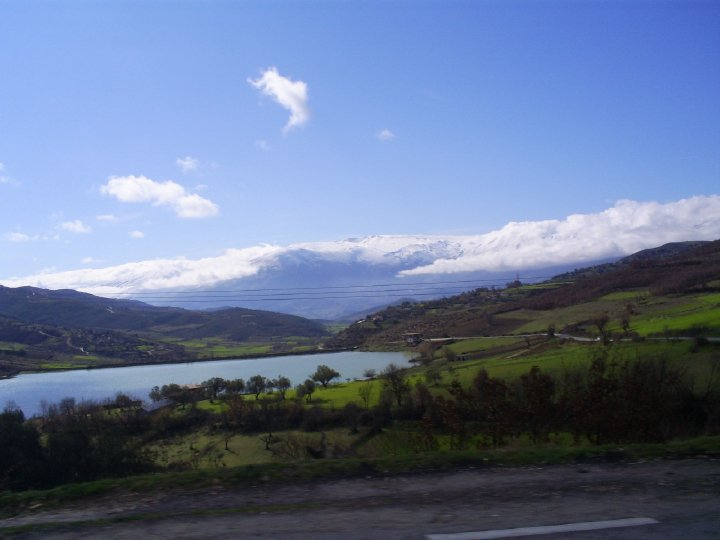

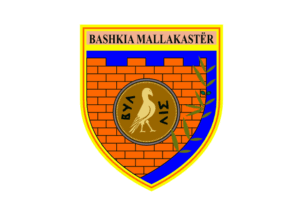
- Flag Emblem

- Location within Albania
- Coordinates: 40°36′N 19°44′E
- Country: Albania
- County: Fier

Government
  - Mayor: Qerim Ismailaj (PS)

Area
  - Municipality: 329.37 km^{2} (127.17 sq mi)

Population (2011)
  - Municipality: 27,062
  - Municipality density: 82.163/km^{2} (212.80/sq mi)
- Time zone: UTC+1 (CET)
  - Summer (DST): UTC+2 (CEST)
- Postal Code: 9308
- Area Code: (0)313
- Website: www.bashkiamallakaster.gov.al

Mallakastër (Albanian definite form: Mallakastra) is a region and a municipality in Fier County, southwestern Albania. It was created in 2015 by the merger of the present municipalities Aranitas, Ballsh, Fratar, Greshicë, Hekal, Kutë, Ngraçan, Qendër Dukas and Selitë. The seat of the municipality is the town Ballsh. The total population is 27,062 (2011 census), in a total area of 329.37 km^{2}. It is coterminous with the former Mallakastër District.

== Name ==
The municipality takes its name from the Mallakastër hills.

== Geography ==
The landscape consists of fields alternated with low hills. Their highest point is the hill Shëndëlli (712 m), not to be confused with the much higher Mount Shëndelli further south.

== Population ==
The people from this region are called Mallakastriotë. The population is Muslim and Orthodox Christian. The region is a center of both the Bektashi order and the Halveti order (to a lesser extent). The region is known for its cultural traditions and has produced many brave fighters including Rrapo Hekali.

== Economy ==
Mallakastër was an industrially important region for Albania since it has reserves of natural gas and oil which make area a center of oil production and refining in Albania. Mallakastër is also known for its agriculture which produces a large variety of products.

== Notable people ==
- Kadri Roshi, famous actor
- Mehmet Shehu, communist politician
- Rrapo Hekali, key figure in the Albanian revolt of 1847
- Liri Belishova, communist politician
- Luftar Paja
- Ismail Klosi
- Ramiz Aranitasi
- Bilbil Klosi, lawyer and judge
- Ardian Klosi, writer and historian
