= Acripus =

Acripus or Akripos (Ancient Greek: Ἄκριπος) was a town of ancient Aetolia, near the border of Acarnania. It is known only through epigraphic testimony mentioning the appointment of a theorodokos of Acripus, about the year 356/5 BCE to welcome the theoroi of Epidaurus.

Its exact location is unknown, although by the order it occupies in the list of theorodokoi, after Amphilochian Argos, it is considered to be in Aetolia rather than Acarnania, to which the following entry (Hyporeiae) belongs.
