= Therminea =

Town of ancient Aetolia

Therminea (Ancient Greek: Θερμινέα) was a town of ancient Aetolia, near the border of Acarnania. It is known only through epigraphic testimony mentioning the appointment of a theorodokos of Therminea, about the year 356/5 BCE to welcome the theoroi of Epidaurus.

Its exact location is unknown, although by the order it occupies in the list of theorodokoi, after Hyporeiae and before Phylea and Proschium, it is considered to be in Aetolia rather than Acarnania.
