= Ascheion =

Ascheion (Ancient Greek: Ἄσχειον) was a city and polis (city-state) of ancient Achaea.

It is mentioned in a decree from Delphi of the 4th century BCE awarding proxeny. A document is also preserved that two theorodokoi of Ascheion were named around 230-220 BCE to host the theoroi of Delphi.
