= Phylea =

Ancient greek city

Phylea (Ancient Greek: Φυλέα) was a town of ancient Aetolia, near the border of Acarnania. It is known only through epigraphic testimony mentioning the appointment of a theorodokos of Phylea, about the year 356/5 BCE to welcome the theoroi of Epidaurus.

Its exact location is unknown, although by the order it occupies in the list of theorodokoi, after Therminea and before Proschium, it is considered to be in Aetolia rather than Acarnania.
