= Winged Victory of Samothrace =

Ancient Greek sculpture

Winged Victory of Samothrace Nike of Samothrace
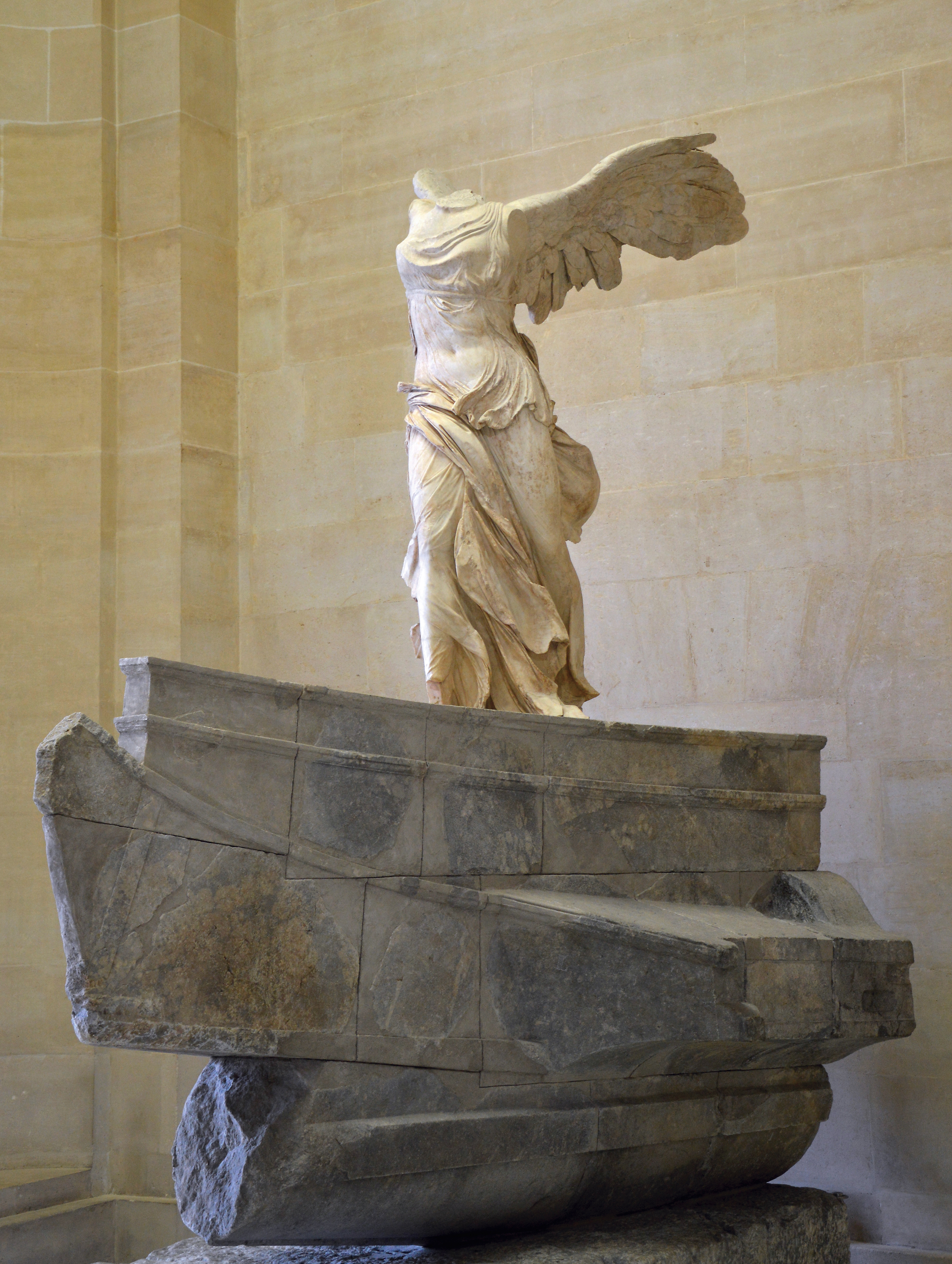
- The Winged Victory of Samothrace
- Year: c. 200–190 BC
- Type: Parian marble
- Dimensions: 244 cm (96 in)
- Location: Louvre, Paris

The Winged Victory of Samothrace, Nike of Samothrace, or simply Victory of Samothrace, is a votive monument originally discovered on the island of Samothrace in the northeastern Aegean Sea. It is a masterpiece of Greek sculpture from the Hellenistic era, dating from around 190 BC. The statue represents the goddess Nike (Victory), whose head and arms are missing, standing on a base in the shape of a ship's bow.

The total height of the monument is 5.57 metres (18 ft 3 in) including the socle; the statue alone measures 2.75 metres (9 ft 0 in). The sculpture is one of a small number of major Hellenistic statues surviving in the original, rather than Roman copies.

Winged Victory has been exhibited at the Louvre in Paris, at the top of the main staircase, since 1884. Greece is seeking the return of the sculpture.

== Discovery and restorations ==
=== In the 19th century ===
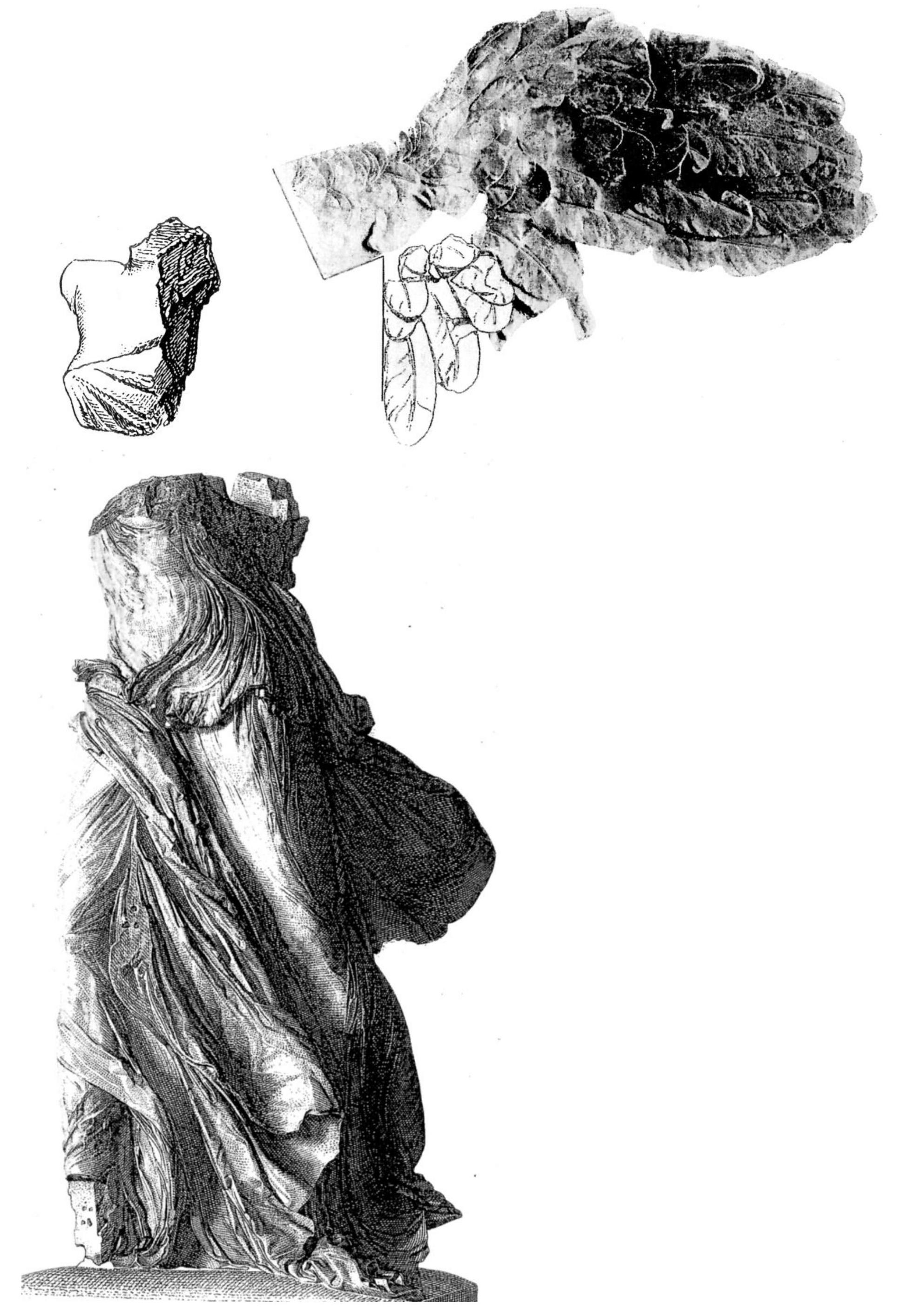
Nike of Samothrace: the conserved parts of the statue, after Benndorf, 1880

In 1863, Charles Champoiseau (1830–1909), acting chief of the Consulate of France in Adrianopolis (now Edirne in Turkey), undertook from March 6 to May 7 the exploration of the ruins of the sanctuary of the Great Gods on the island of Samothrace. On April 13, 1863, he discovered part of the bust and the body of a large female statue in white marble accompanied by numerous fragments of drapery and feathers. He recognised this as the goddess Nike, Victory, traditionally represented in Greek antiquity as a winged woman. In the same place was a jumble of about fifteen large grey marble blocks whose form or function was unclear: he concluded it was a funerary monument. He decided to send the statue and fragments to the Louvre Museum, and to leave the large blocks of grey marble on site. Departing Samothrace at the beginning of May 1863, the statue arrived in Toulon at the end of August and in Paris on May 11, 1864.

A first restoration was undertaken by Adrien Prévost de Longpérier, then curator of Antiquities at the Louvre, between 1864 and 1866. The main part of the body (2.14 m from the upper belly to the feet) is erected on a stone base, and largely completed by fragments of drapery, including the fold of himation that flares behind the legs on the Nike. The remaining fragments – the right part of the bust and a large part of the left wing – too incomplete to be placed on the statue, are stored. Given the exceptional quality of the sculpture, Longpérier decided to present the body alone, exhibited until 1880 among the Roman statues, first in the Caryatid Room, then briefly in the Tiber Room.

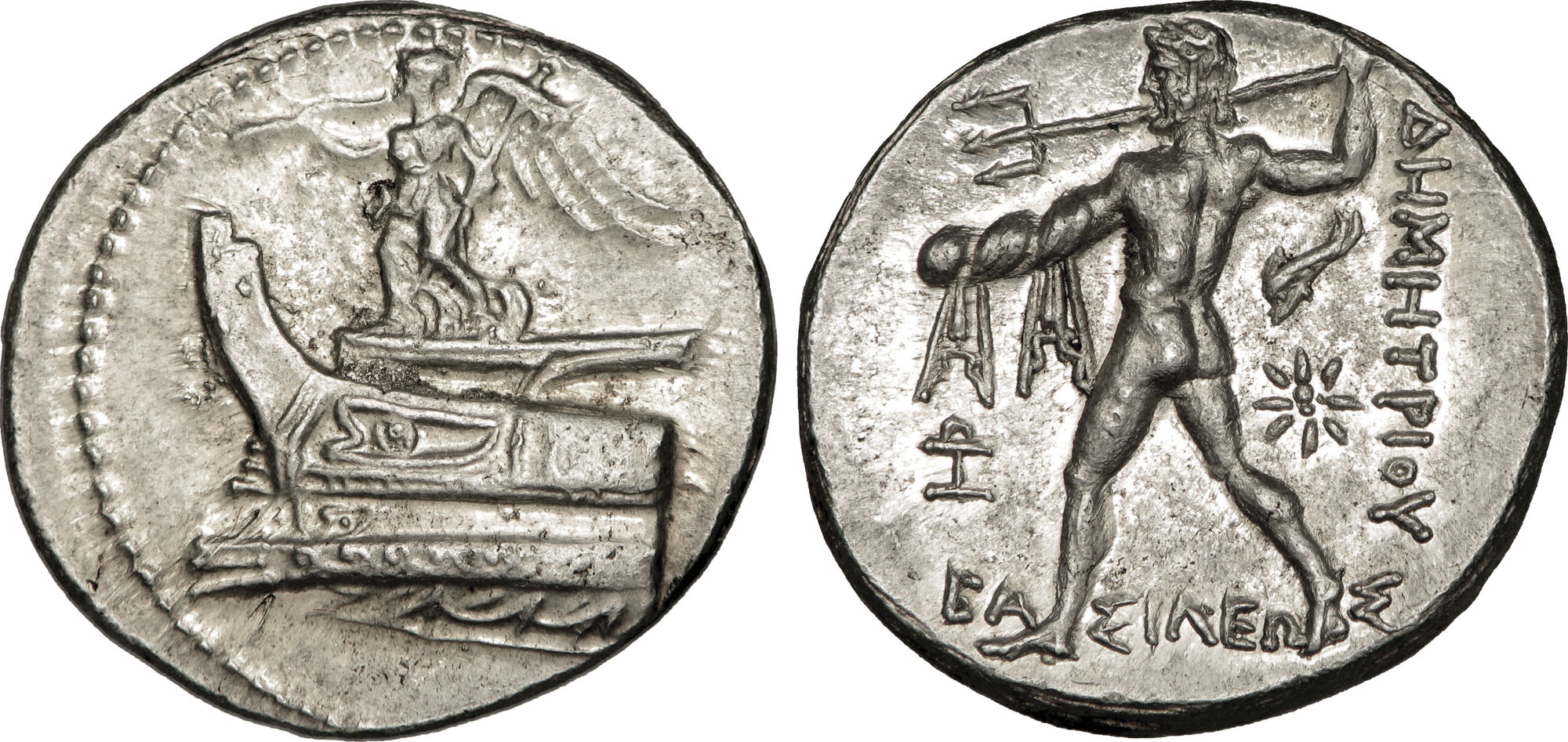
Tetradrachm of Demetrios Poliorcetes (293–292 BC). Obverse: Nike before the ship; reverse: Poseidon.

Beginning in 1875, Austrian archaeologists who, under the direction of Alexander Conze, had been excavating the buildings of the Samothrace sanctuary since 1870, studied the location where Champoiseau had found the Victory. Architect Aloïs Hauser drew the grey marble blocks left on-site and apprehended that, once properly assembled, they would form the tapered bow of a warship, and that, placed on a base of slabs, they served as the basis for the statue. Tetradrachmas of Demetrios Poliorcetes struck between 301 and 292 BC, representing a Victory on the bow of a ship, wings outstretched, give a good idea of this type of monument. For his part, the specialist in ancient sculpture Otto Benndorf studied the body of the statue and the fragments kept in reserve at the Louvre and restored the statue blowing into a trumpet that she raises with her right arm, as on the coin. The two men thus managed to make a model of the Samothrace monument as a whole.

Champoiseau, informed of this research, undertook a second mission to Samothrace from August 15 to 29, 1879, for the sole purpose of sending the blocks of the base and the slabs of the Victory base to the Louvre. He abandoned on the island the largest block of the base, unsculpted. Two months later, the blocks reached the Louvre Museum, where in December an assembly test was carried out in a courtyard.

The curator of the Department of Antiquities, Félix Ravaisson-Mollien, then decided to reconstruct the monument, in accordance with the model of Austrian archaeologists. On the body of the statue, between 1880 and 1883 he restored the belt area in plaster, placed the right part of the marble bust, recreated the left part in plaster, attached the left marble wing with a metal frame, and replaced the entire right wing with a plaster model. But he did not reconstruct the head, arms or feet. The ship-shaped base is rebuilt and completed, except for the broken bow of the keel, and there is still a large void at the top aft. The statue was placed directly on the base. The entire monument was then placed from the front, on the upper landing of the Daru staircase, the main staircase of the museum.

Champoiseau returned to Samothrace a third time in 1891 to try to obtain the Victory's head, but without success. He did however bring back debris from the drapery and base, a small fragment with an inscription and fragments of coloured plaster.

=== In the 20th century ===
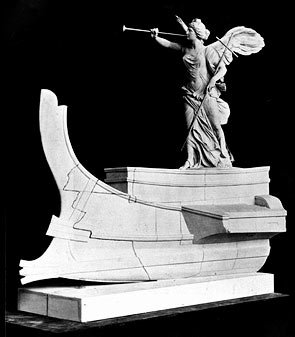
Model of the Victory of Samothrace after Benndorf and Hauser, 1880.

The presentation of the Victory was modified in 1934 as part of a general redevelopment of the Daru museum and staircase, whose steps were widened and redecorated. The monument was staged to constitute the crowning of the staircase: it was advanced on the landing to be more visible from the bottom of the steps, and was put on a modern 45 cm-high block of stone, supposed to evoke a combat bridge at the bow of the ship. This presentation remained unchanged until 2013.

At the declaration of the Second World War in September 1939, the Victory statue was moved along with other artefacts to the Château de Valençay (Indre) until the Liberation, and was replaced at the top of the stairs without damage in July 1945.

American excavators from New York University, under the direction of Karl Lehmann, resumed exploration of the sanctuary of the Great Gods in Samothrace in 1938. In July 1950, they associated Louvre curator Jean Charbonneaux with their work, who discovered the palm of the statue's right hand in the Victory site. Two fingers preserved at the Kunsthistorisches Museum in Vienna since the Austrian excavations of 1875 were reattached to the palm. The palm and fingers were then deposited in the Louvre Museum, and displayed with the statue in 1954.

Two pieces of grey marble that were used to moor fishing boats on the beach below the sanctuary were retrieved and reassembled at the museum in 1952. These were studied in 1996 by Ira Mark and Marianne Hamiaux, who concluded that these pieces, jointed, constitute the block of the base abandoned by Champoiseau in 1879.

=== In the 21st century ===
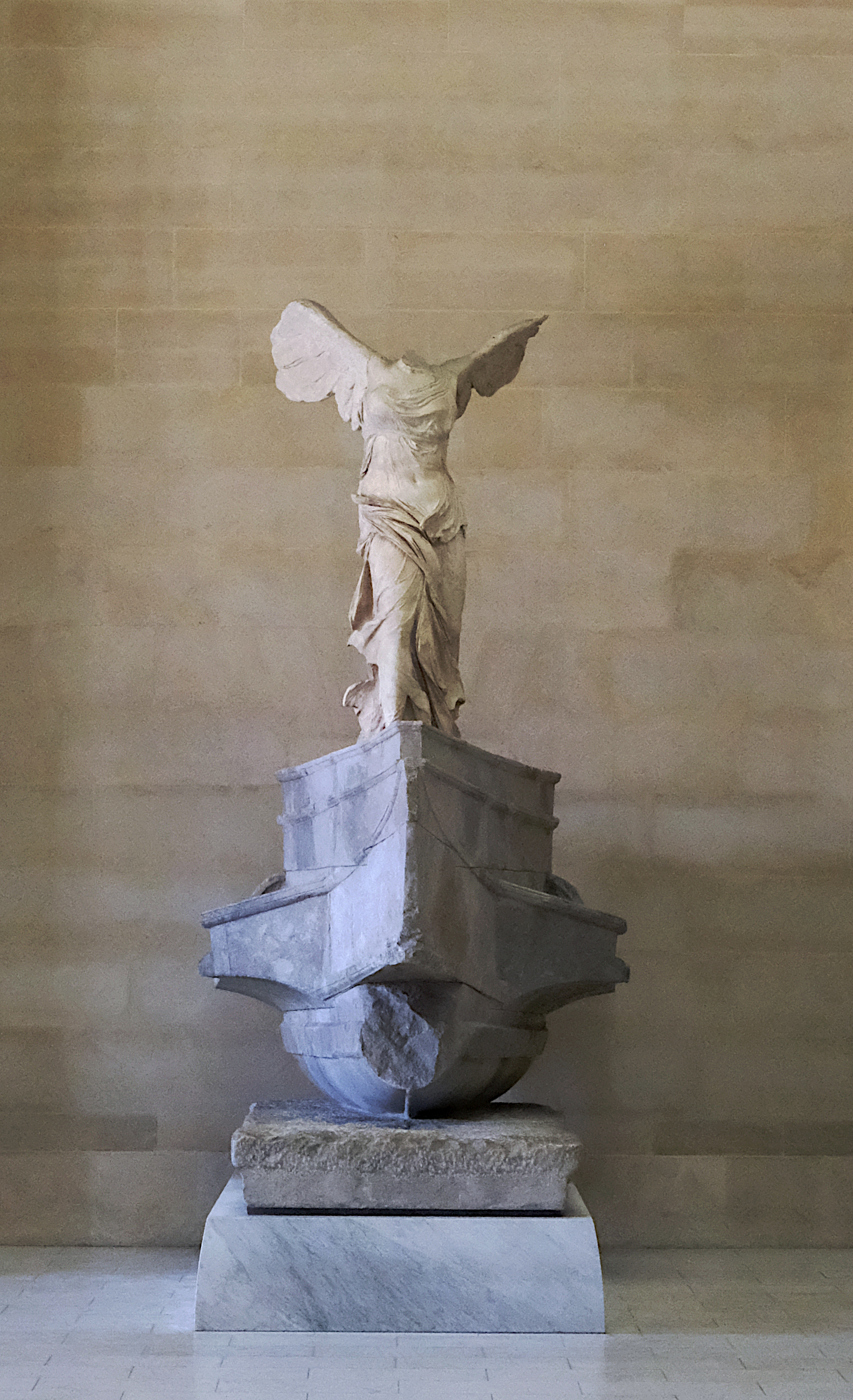
The Winged Victory of Samothrace after the restoration of 2014.

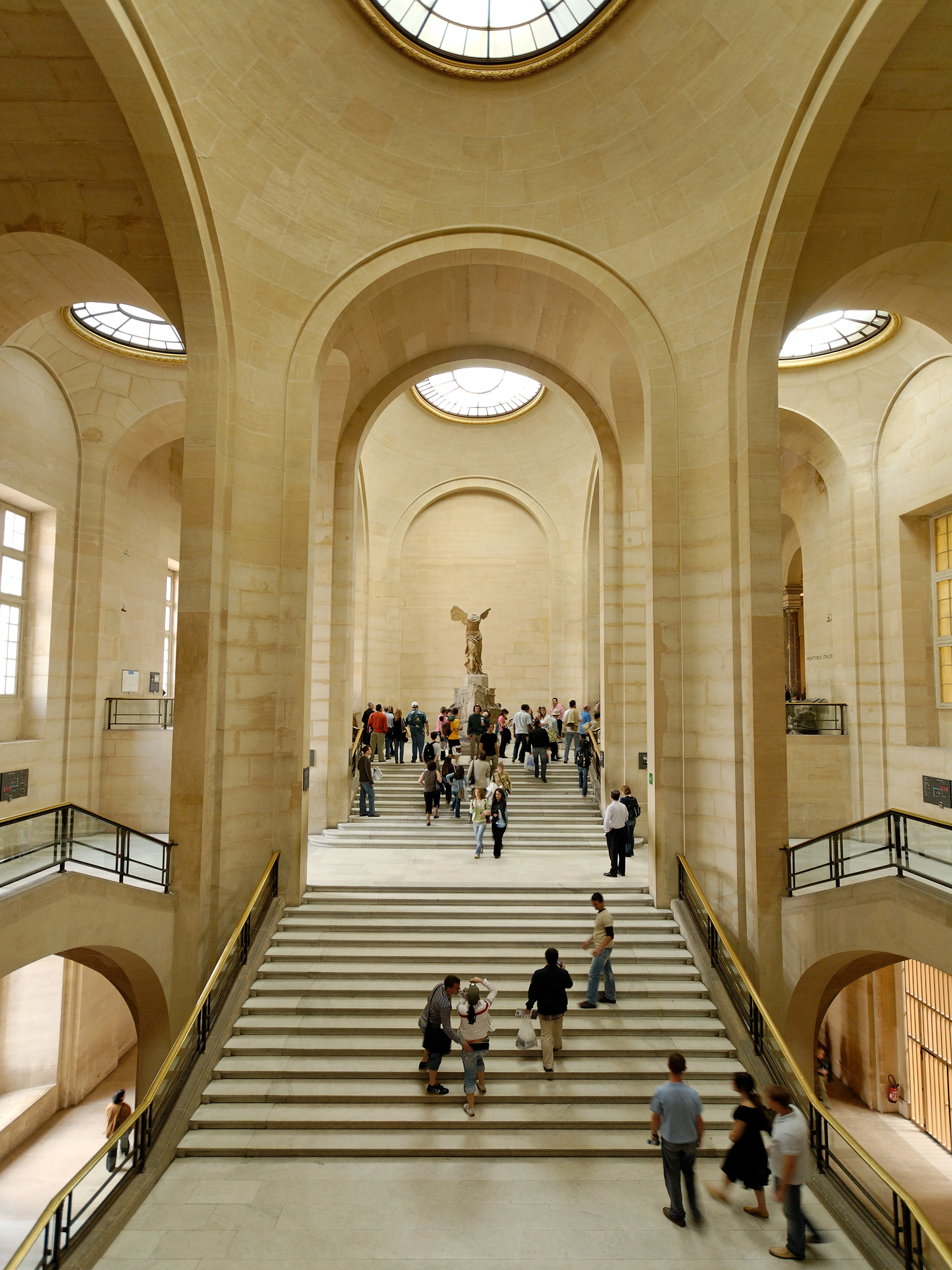
The Nike of Samothrace at the Louvre Palace in Paris, at the top of the main staircase.

An American team led by James R. McCredie digitized the entire sanctuary to allow its 3D reconstruction between 2008 and 2014. B. D. Wescoat led the resumption of the study of the Victory enclosure and the small basic fragments preserved in reserve.

In Paris, the Louvre Museum restored the entire monument with two objectives: to clean all the surfaces and to improve the general presentation. The statue came down from its base to undergo scientific examination (UV, infrared, x-rays, microspectrography, marble analysis): traces of blue paint were detected on the wings and on a strip at the bottom of the mantle. The blocks of the base were disassembled one by one to be drawn and studied. The 19th-century restoration of the statue was preserved with a few details (thinning of the neck and attachment of the left arm); fragments preserved in reserve at the Louvre were added (feather at the top of the left wing, a fold at the back of the chitôn); and the metal vice behind the left leg was removed. Castings of small joint fragments preserved in Samothrace were integrated into the base. A cast of the large ship block left in Samothrace was replaced by a metal base on a cylinder ensuring the proper balance of the statue. Once in place on the base, the colour contrast of the marbles of the two elements became obvious again. The whole was reassembled on a modern base, a little removed on the landing to facilitate the movement of visitors.

The Greek government considers the Winged Victory, like the Elgin Marbles, illegally plundered and wants it repatriated to Greece. "If the French and the Louvre have a problem, we are ready to preserve and accentuate the Victory of Samothrace, if they return it to us", Deputy Minister of Foreign Affairs Akis Gerondopoulos said in 2013.

== Description ==
=== The statue ===
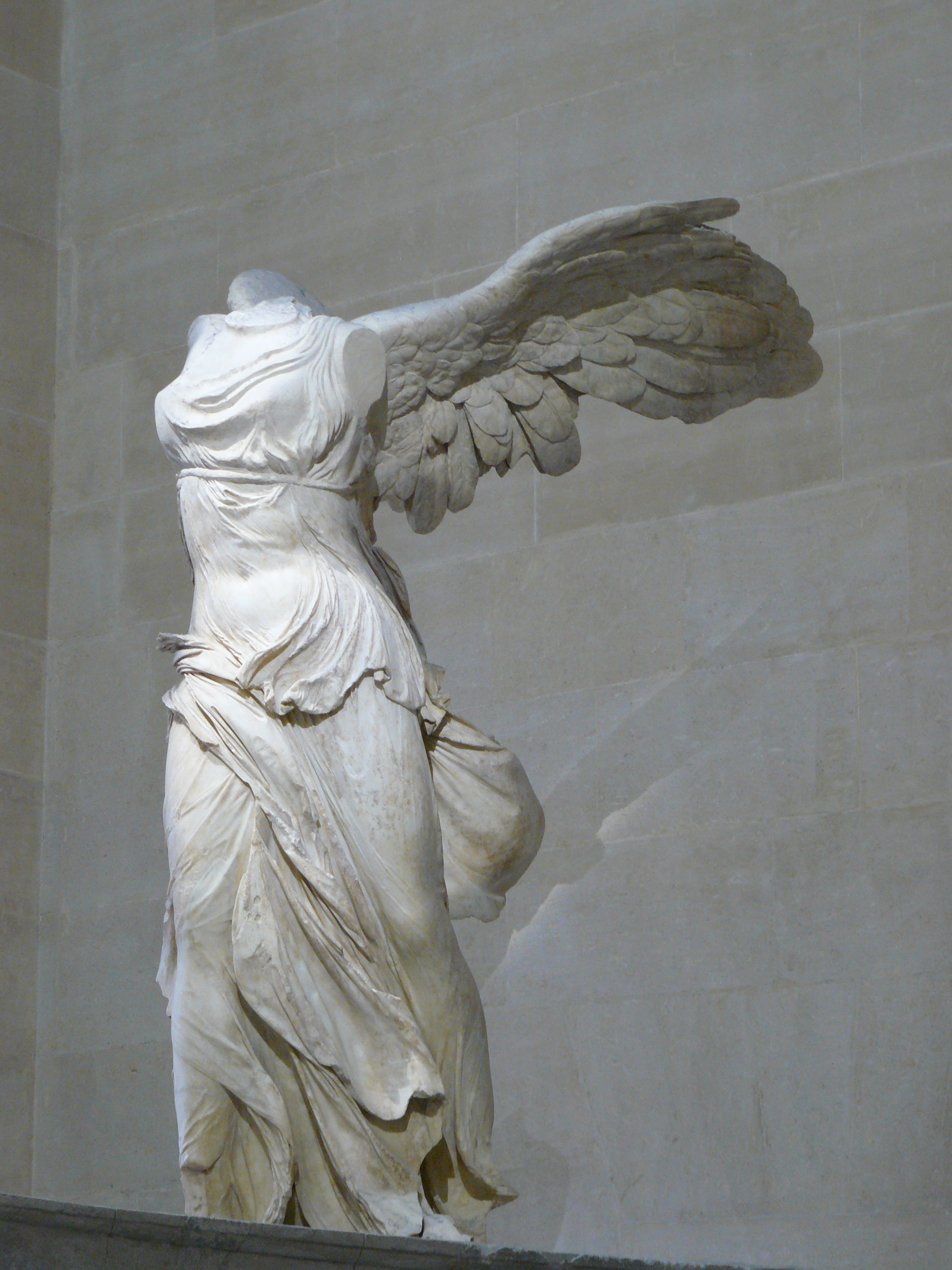
2015 view

The statue, in white Parian marble, depicts a winged woman, the goddess of Victory (Nike), alighting on the bow of a warship.

The Nike is dressed in a long tunic (χιτών, chitôn) in a very fine fabric, with a folded flap and belted under the chest. It was attached to the shoulders by two thin straps (the restoration is not accurate). The lower body is partially covered by a thick mantle (ἱμάτιον, himation) rolled up at the waist and untied when uncovering the entire left leg; one end slides between the legs to the ground, and the other, much shorter, flies freely in the back. The mantle is falling, and only the force of the wind holds it on her right leg. The sculptor has multiplied the effects of draperies, between places where the fabric is plated against the body by revealing its shapes, especially on the belly, and those where it accumulates in folds deeply hollowed out casting a strong shadow, as between the legs. This extreme virtuosity concerns the left side and front of the statue. On the right side, the layout of the drapery is reduced to the main lines of the clothes, in a much less elaborate work.

The goddess advances, leaning on her right leg. The two feet that were bare have not been found. The right touched the ground, the heel still slightly raised; the left foot, the leg strongly stretched back, was still carried in the air. The goddess is not walking, she is finishing her flight, her large wings still spread out backwards. The arms were also not found, but the right shoulder raised indicates that the right arm was raised to the side. With her elbow bent, the goddess made a victorious gesture of salvation with her hand: this hand with outstretched fingers held nothing (neither trumpet nor crown). There is no clue to reconstructing the position of the left arm, probably lowered, very slightly bent; the goddess may have held a stylis (a naval standard) on this side, a kind of mast taken as a trophy on the enemy ship, as seen on coins. The statue is designed to be seen three quarters left (right for the spectator), from where the lines of the composition are very clear: a vertical from the neck to the right foot, and an oblique starting from the neck diagonally along the left leg. "The whole body is inscribed in a rectangular triangle, a simple but very solid geometric figure: it was necessary to support both the fulfilled shapes of the goddess, the accumulation of draperies, and the energy of movement". Most recently the Alula feather was restored to the left wing in a flared position, as it would be for a bird landing.

The art historian H. W. Janson has pointed out that unlike earlier Greek or Near Eastern sculptures, the Nike creates a deliberate relationship to the imaginary space around the goddess. The wind that has carried her and which she is fighting off, straining to keep steady – as mentioned the original mounting had her standing on a ship's prow, just having landed – is the invisible complement of the figure and the viewer is made to imagine it. At the same time, this expanded space heightens the symbolic force of the work; the wind and the sea are suggested as metaphors of struggle, destiny and divine help or grace. This kind of interplay between a statue and the space conjured up would become a common device in baroque and romantic art, about two thousand years later. It is present in Michelangelo's sculpture of David: David's gaze and pose show where he is seeing his adversary Goliath and his awareness of the moment – but it is rare in ancient art.

=== The boat and the base ===
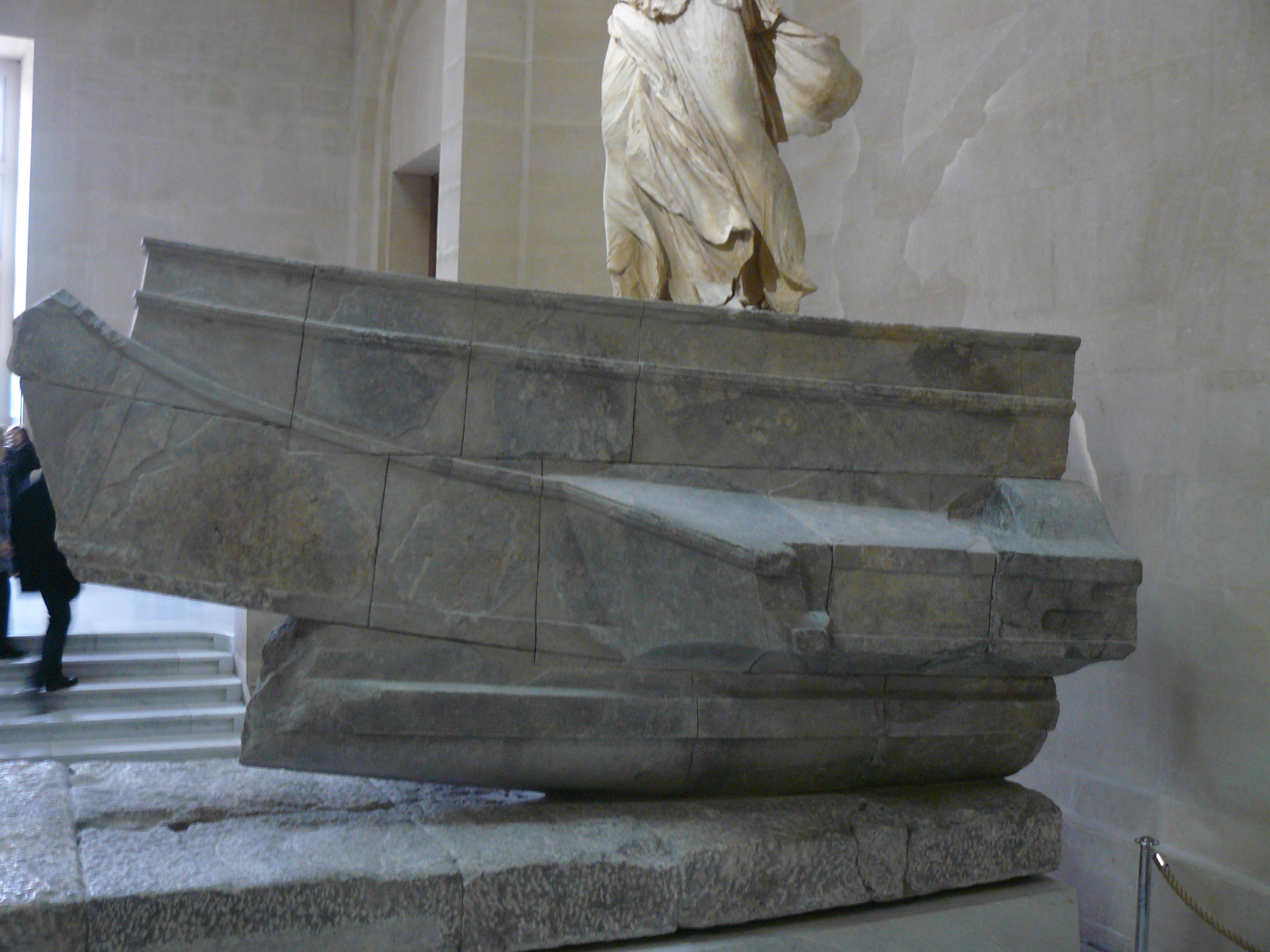
The base in the form of a ship's prow.

These are carved from grey marble veined with white, identified as that of the quarries of Lartos, in Rhodes. The base has the shape of the bow of a Greek Hellenistic warship: long and narrow, it is covered at the front by a combat deck on which the statue is located. It has reinforced, projecting oar boxes on the sides that supported two rows of staggered oars (the oval oar slots are also depicted). The keel is rounded. At the bottom of the bow, at the waterline, a large triple-pronged spur would have been sculpted, and a little higher up, a smaller two-bladed ram that would have been used to smash the hull of the enemy ship would have been shown. The top of the bow was crowned by a high and curved bow ornament (the acrostolion). These missing elements have not been reconstructed, which greatly reduces the vessel's warlike appearance.

Epigraphist Christian Blinkenberg thought that this bow was that of a trihēmiolia, a type of warship often named in Rhodes inscriptions: the island's shipyards were renowned, and its war fleet important. But specialists in ancient naval architecture do not agree on the ascription of the trihemolia. It can only be said that the Samothrace bow has boxes of oars and two benches of superimposed oars. Each oar being operated by several rowers, this can also be suitable for a quadrireme (4 files of rowers) or a quinquereme (5 files of rowers). These ships were widespread in all Hellenistic war fleets, including the Rhodian fleet.

=== Dimensions and construction of the set ===
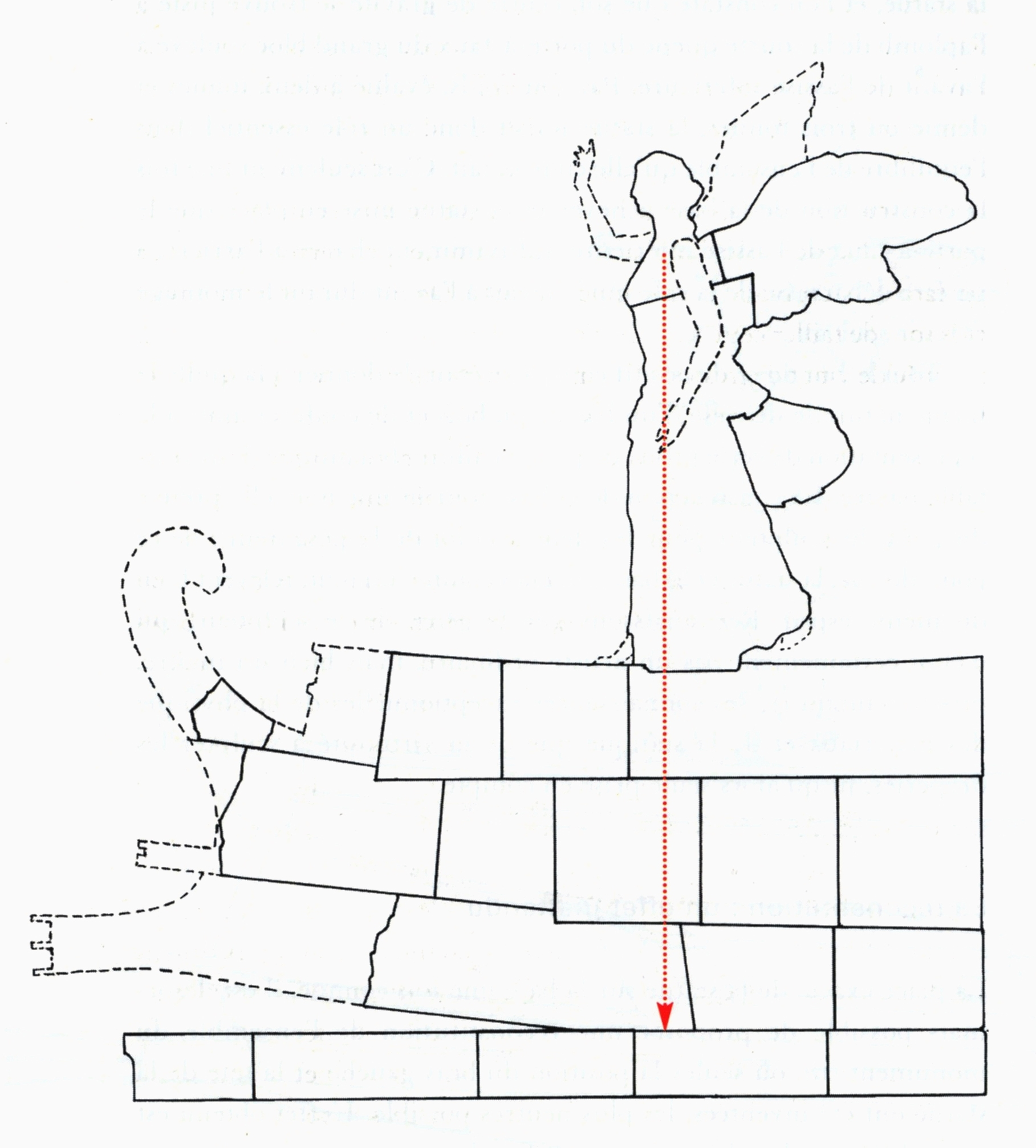
Construction of the assembled monument, (drawing V. Foret).

- Total height: 5.57 m
- Statue height: 2.75 m with wings; 2.40 m body without head
- Ship height: 2.01 m; length: 4.29 m; width max.: 2.48 m
- Base height: 0.36 m; length: 4.76 m; width: 1.76 m

The Victory statue, about 1.6 times life size, is not cut from a single block of marble, but composed of six blocks worked separately: the body, the bust with the head, the two arms and the two wings. These blocks were assembled together by metal braces (bronze or iron). This technique, used for a long time by Greek sculptors for the protruding parts of statues, was used in Hellenistic times for the body itself, thus making it possible to use smaller pieces of marble, therefore less rare and less expensive. In the case of Victory, the sculptor optimized this technique by tilting the joint surfaces that connect the wings to the body by 20° forward, which ensured their cantilevered support in the back. To the body-block were added smaller projecting pieces: the end of the flying mantle at the back and the end of the fold falling to the ground in front of the left leg have been reattached; the right foot, the back of the left leg with the foot and a drapery fold in front of the legs are lost.

The ship is composed of 16 blocks divided into three increasingly wide assizes aft, placed on a rectangular base. The seventeenth block, which remained in Samothrace, completed the void at the back of the upper assembly, just under the statue. Its weight allowed the cantilever of the blocks of the protruding oar boxes to hold on the sides. The baseboard of the statue was embedded in a basin dug on this block. Its contours, fully visible during the 2014 restoration, made it possible to determine the location of the statue very precisely.

The statue and base are inseparable to ensure the balance of the monument, designed as a whole.

== Architectural context ==
=== The location ===
General plan of the Samothrace temple complex. The Victory was situated above the theatre at No. 9.

The sanctuary of the Great Gods of Samothrace is located in a very narrow river valley. The buildings reserved for the Mysteries ceremonies occupied the entire bottom of the valley. From the 3rd century BC, the entrance to the site was a monumental propylaia to the east. To the west was a very long portico to house pilgrims (the stoa) and important offerings. The Victory Monument was located at the south end of the portico terrace, in a rectangular space dug into the hillside, and set back and raised from the theatre; facing north, it overlooks the entire sanctuary. In 1863 Champoiseau described and drew the monument surrounded on three sides by a limestone wall. All that remains of this enclosure now are the foundations of the walls, surrounded at the bottom and sides by walls supporting the lands of the hill. The enclosure itself is 13.40 m wide by 9.55 m long, and we know from the surveys made by Hauser in 1876 that the Victory was arranged obliquely 14.5° from the back wall. This arrangement highlights the left side of the statue for the observer from the terrace, which explains why the sculpture work is much more elaborate on this side than on the other. Large natural rocks are visible in the front part of the space. The foundation walls have been restored and the place of the monument artificially indicated.

=== Interpretation ===
The reconstructed whole has given rise to various interpretations. K. Lehmann hypothesized that the monument was placed in the basin of an open-air fountain, with water effects on the large rocks arranged for this purpose. But they could not be part of the original layout since the palm of the right hand was found under one of them: Charbonneau thought they came from a later natural landslide. The fountain hypothesis has been abandoned since the excavations of J. McCredie and B. Wescoat demonstrated that there was no water supply to the enclosure.

Recent research has not determined the exact nature of the Victory's architectural setting, more than 500 blocks of which have been reused in a Byzantine construction at the other end of the west hill. Fragments of coloured plaster and some elements of terracotta architectural decoration were found in the enclosure. Two 3D reconstructions have been proposed by B. Wescoat: either low walls forming a peribolos around the open-air monument, or a covered building with columns and pediment of the naiskos type. The excellent state of conservation of the sculpture's surface suggests that it did not stay in the open air for long. The overall reconstruction of the sanctuary in 3D also highlighted that the statue of Victory was oriented along the axis of the river, which was the only unobstructed perspective of the sanctuary: the monument was thus clearly visible from the bottom of the valley.

Another hypothesis was proposed by Jean Richer who observed that the ship on which the statue is placed represents the constellation of the Argo: the ship's bow and the statue had been deliberately placed at an angle, within the important Sanctuary of the Great Gods of Samothrace, so that Victory looked northward: according to Richer, this direction shows the path that leads to the gate of the gods identified at Mount Hemos, and thus alludes to a spiritual victory; for, in this orientation, the momentum and gaze of the statue were directed at the northeast corner of the Anaktoron, seat of the Little Mysteries, where initiation was given. This angle was thus the most sacred of the building.

== Function, date and style ==
=== An offering ===
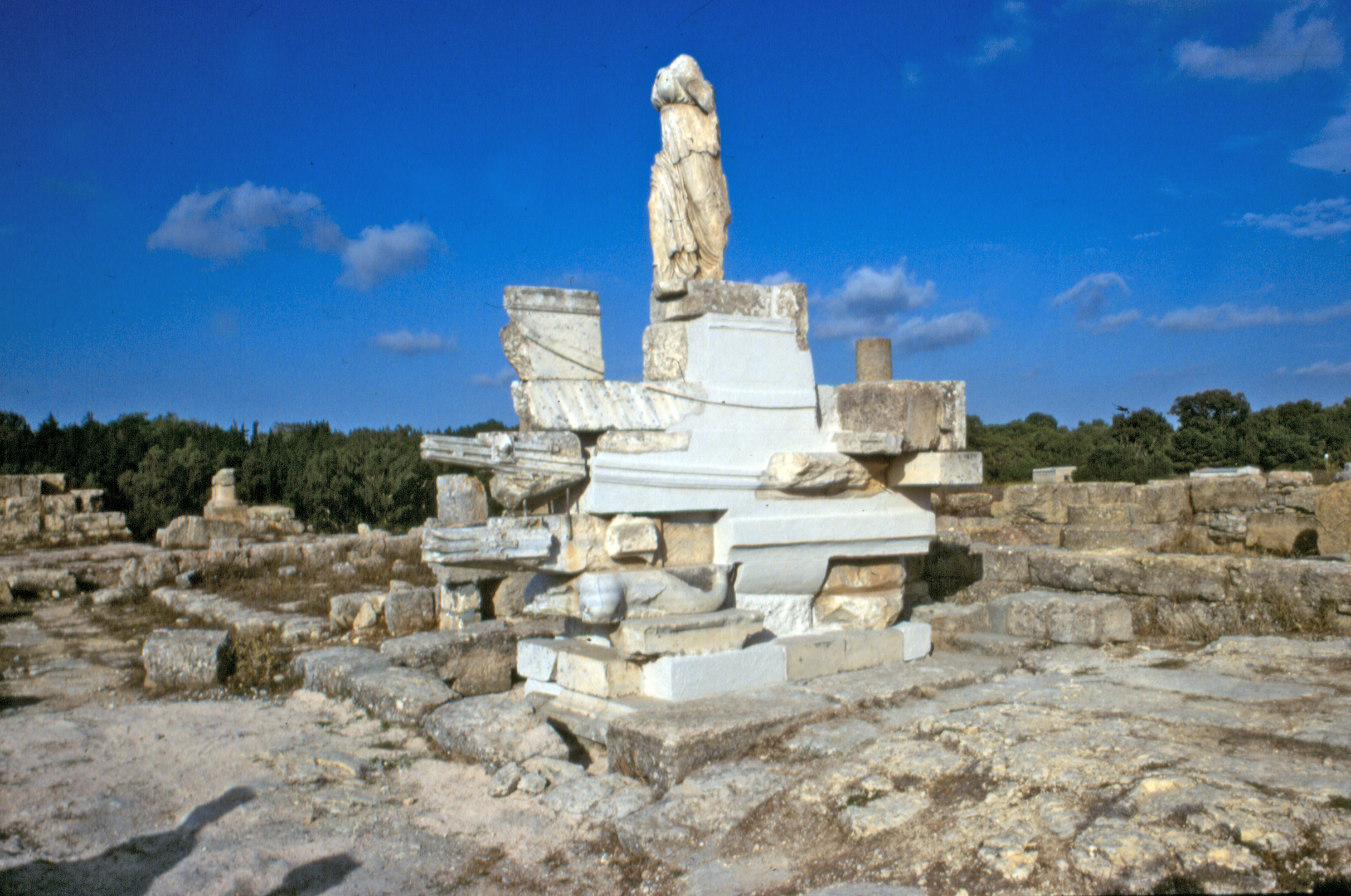
Naval monument in the agora of Cyrene

In the sanctuary of the Great Gods of Samothrace, as in all the great pan-Hellenic shrines, the faithful offered their ex-votos, from the most modest to the most sumptuous according to their wealth. It was a way to honour the gods and thank them for their benefits. In addition to a promise of a better spiritual life, the Cabeiri gods, including the Dioscuri, were reputed to ensure their protection to those who were initiated into their Mysteries if they were in danger at sea and in combat. Summoning them allowed their initiates to be saved from shipwreck and to obtain victory. In this context, a representation of Victory landing on a ship's bow can be interpreted as an offering to thank the Great Gods following an important naval victory.

Several major naval offerings were known in the 3rd century BC. In the Greek world, such as the "bull monument" in Delos, the naval monument of the agora in Cyrene and Samothrace itself, the Neorion (No. 6 on the map), which housed a ship about twenty meters long. In Rhodes, an offering of the same type as the base of Samothrace, but smaller, was found in the sanctuary of Athena at the top of the acropolis of Lindos.

=== Dating ===
The dedication inscription of the Victory Monument has not been found. Archaeologists are reduced to hypothesizing to define the historical context and to determine the naval victory justifying the erection of such an important ex voto. The difficulty lies in the fact that in the 2nd and 3rd centuries BC naval battles to dominate the Aegean Sea were very numerous, first pitting the Antigonids and their Seleucid allies against the Lagids, then the Seleucids to the Rhodians and Pergamon.

Austrian archaeologists first considered that the monument of Samothrace is the one represented on the tetradrachma of Demetrios Poliorcetes. They conclude that, like the coin, he celebrated his victory against Ptolemy I at the Battle of Salamis at Cyprus in 306 BC. According to Benndorf, the Victory of Samothrace therefore dates from the last years of the fourth century BC. and may have been sculpted by a student of sculptor Scopas.

The construction of the monument was then related to the Battle of Cos (around 262–255 BC), during which the King of Macedonia Antigonus II Gonatas defeated the Lagids, allied with Athens and Sparta during the Chremonidean War. Antigonus Gonatas is also credited with the dedication, at the same time, of his flagship in the Neorium in Delos.

The material of the base of the Victory of Samothrace was identified as early as 1905 as marble from the quarries of Lartos in Rhodes. The same is true of the small fragment found in 1891 by Champoiseau within the walls of the monument to Samothrace, bearing the end of an engraved name: [...]Σ ΡΟΔΙΟΣ. In 1931, Hermann Thiersch restored the name of the sculptor "Pythokritos son of Timocharis of Rhodes", active around 210–165 BC. He was convinced that the fragment belongs to the ship-shaped base: he therefore made this sculptor the author of the Victory of Samothrace. According to him, the monument was commissioned by the Rhodians, allies in the kingdom of Pergamos against Antiochus III, after their victory at the naval battles of Side and Myonnesos, on the Ionian coast, in 190 BC. Excavations revealed that the sculpture was positioned alighting on a flagship, that was set in the ground in a way that it looked as it was floating. The definitive victory against the Seleucids came in 189 BC. at the Battle of Sipyla Magnesia. The monument was therefore reportedly erected in Samothrace shortly after that date. Jean Charbonneaux also admits the historical link between the Victory of Samothrace and the battles of Myonnesus and Magnesia, and makes it the dedication of King Eumene II.

Based on the same arguments, Nathan Badoud in 2018 favoured the conflict that earlier pitted the Rhodians and the King of Pergamon against King Philip V of Macedonia. The Rhodians were first defeated at the naval Battle of Lade in 201 BC. Then Philip V was defeated at sea by the two allies at the Battle of Chios in 201 BC. Rhodes and Pergamon called on the Roman Republic for reinforcements, and Titus Quinctius Flamininus crushed the Macedonian army in Thessaly with the Battle of Cynoscephalae. The Rhodians reportedly dedicated the Victory Monument after that date, for their victory in Chios.

Other researchers have considered later occasions: the victory of the Romans at Pydna in 168 BC. over Perseus, or a consecration of the kingdom of Pergamon at the same time, or the victory of Pergamon and Rhodes against Prusias II of Bithynia in 154 BC.

=== Style and workshop ===
Although the supposed dedication inscription of the name of a Rhodian found at the Victory's base was very quickly contested because of its small size, the entire monument remained attributed to the Rhodian sculpture school. This made it possible to put an end to previous doubts about the style of the statue. In 1955 Margarete Bieber made him a major figure in the "Rhodian school" and the "Hellenic Baroque", next to the frieze of the Gigantomachy of the Great Altar of Pergamon, characterized by the strength of attitudes, the virtuosity of the draperies and the expressiveness of the figures. This style lasted in Rhodes until Roman times in complex and monumental creations such as the Laocoon group or Sperlonga sculptures attributed or signed by Rhodian sculptors.

The base blocks and the sculpture of the statue are not by the same hand. The two parts of the monument were designed together, but produced by two different workshops. The marble base of Lartos was certainly made in Rhodes, where there are parallels. Moreover, the Rhodian sculpture in large marble is of high quality, without being exceptional for its time, but there are no parallels for the virtuosity of the Nike, which remains unusual. The sculptor could also come from elsewhere, as was common in the ancient Greek world for great artists. The Victory of Samothrace is a grandiose adaptation of the moving statue of the Athena–Nike of the Cyrene monument: the sculptor added wings, stretched out the front leg to express the flight, and modified the arrangement of the mantle with the floating panel at the back. He thus gave the statue of Samothrace a dynamic that brings it closer to the figures the Gigantomachy of the altar of Pergamon, conceived shortly after in the same spirit.

== Modern copies and derivative works ==
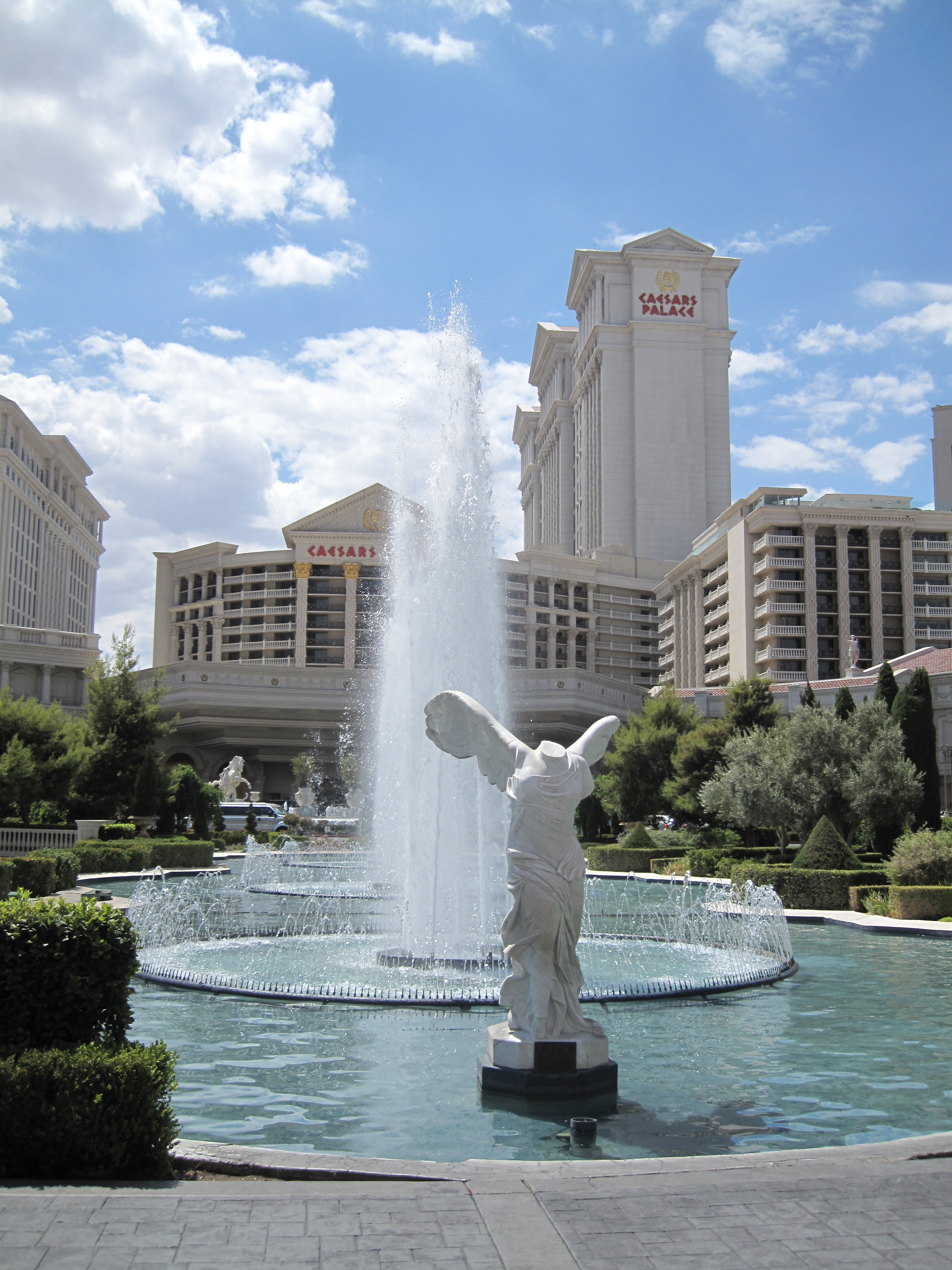
The Winged Victory of Samothrace copy, Caesars Palace Casino, Las Vegas, Nevada, U.S.

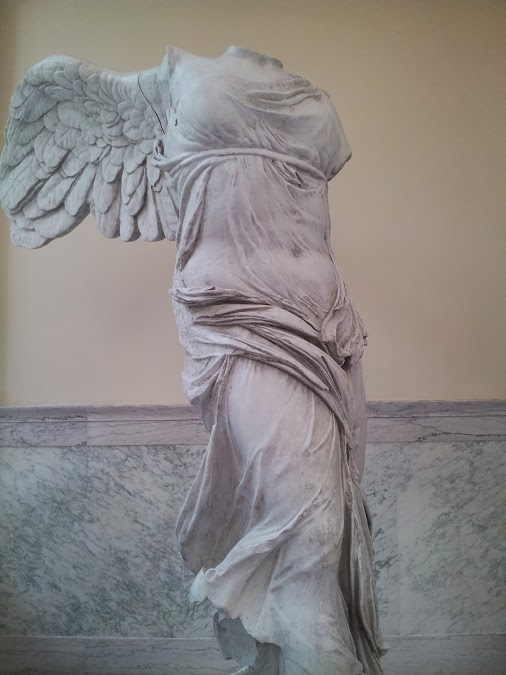
A copy at the Idaho State Capitol

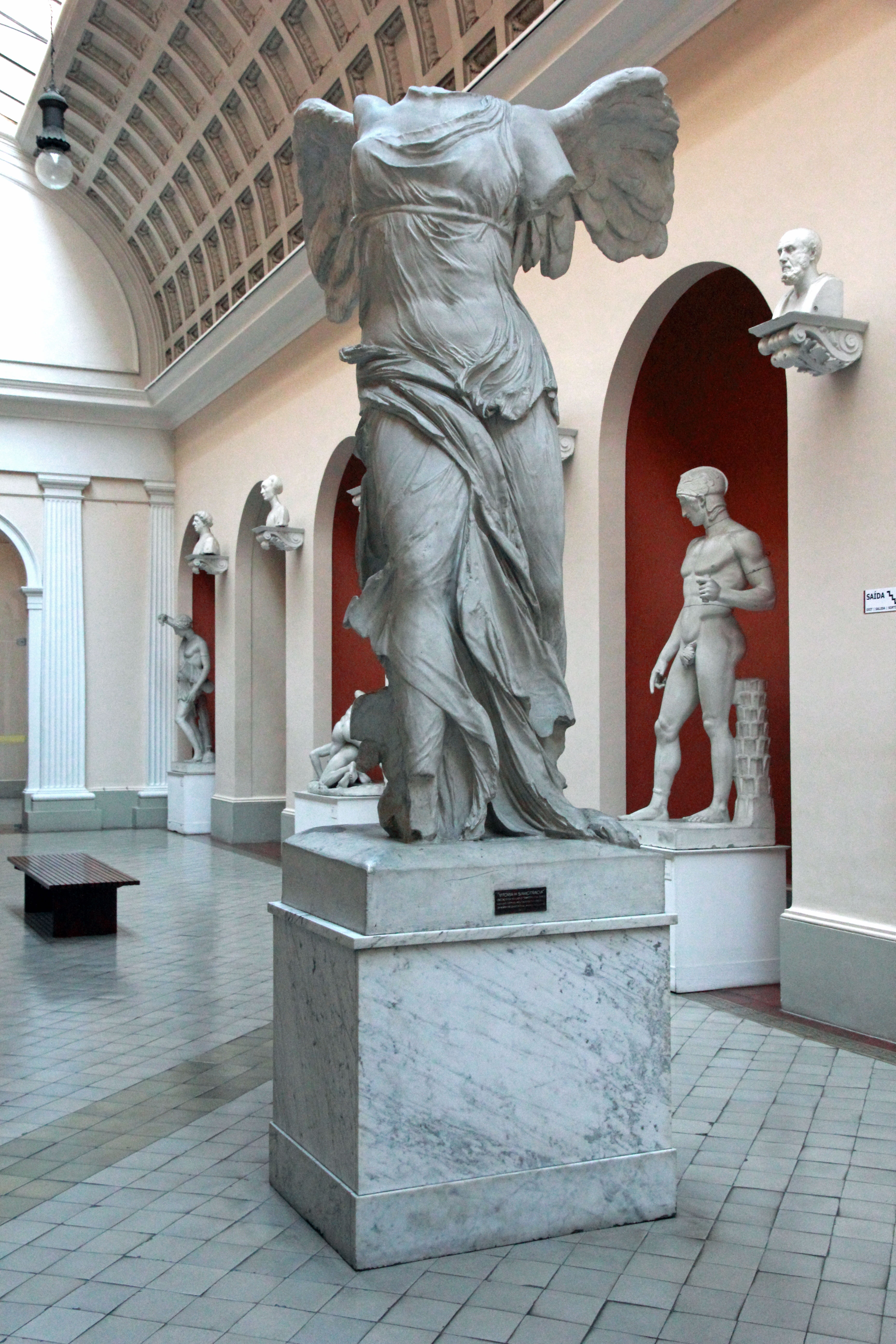
A plaster copy of the Winged Victory in the National Museum of Fine Arts in Rio de Janeiro, Brazil

Numerous copies and inspired derivations exist in art and literature:

- One of the best-known copies stands outside the Caesars Palace casino in Las Vegas.
- Among the buried ruins of the Capitolium of Brixia, was found, in good state of preservation, an Ancient Roman bronze statue representing a winged victory.
- The statue was a favorite of architect Frank Lloyd Wright and he used reproductions of it in a number of his buildings, including Ward Willits House, Darwin D. Martin House and Storer House.
- Augustus Saint-Gaudens' 1903 William Tecumseh Sherman statue of General William Tecumseh Sherman in Grand Army Plaza, New York City, depicts a robed, winged Nike leading Sherman while holding a palm branch, as a symbol of his victory in the Civil War and the peace to follow. Saint-Gaudens' work depicts Nike with her right arm raised while it is thought the original Nike was not making such gesture.
- The largest public sculpture based on Nike appears in a prominent position atop the massive Pennsylvania State Memorial at Gettysburg National Military Park in Pennsylvania. Philadelphia sculptor Samuel Murray, a student and intimate of painter Thomas Eakins, produced the 28-foot figure in 1911 with possible influence from Augustus Saint-Gaudens' Nike interpretation on the Sherman Memorial in New York City (1903). Murray adapted the laurel wreath and olive branch innovations but also placed a sword in Nike's raised right hand.
- Starting in 1962, Yves Klein produced a series of plaster replicas of the Nike coated in dry pigment of his signature International Klein Blue affixed by resin entitled La Victoire de Samatrace.
- Swedish author Gunnar Ekelöf made Nike a central image in his poem Samothrace, written in 1941, where the faceless deity, arms outstretched like sails, is made into a symbol of the fight and the coming victory against Nazism and the struggle for freedom throughout history.
- The status is featured in the Matthew Reilly novel Seven Ancient Wonders, where it is fictionally made part of the Statue of Zeus at Olympia.
- A full-size replica of the statue sits in The Ohio State University's Thompson Library in Columbus, Ohio.
- A full-size replica stands in the lobby of Crouse College, home to the Setnor School of Music, at Syracuse University in Syracuse, New York.
- A 7-foot (2.1 m) replica of the sculpture stands at Connecticut College in New London, Connecticut.
- The second-largest replica of this statue in the United States stands at Calvary Catholic Cemetery in Pittsburgh, Pennsylvania, and is 10 ft (3.0 m) high.
- Texas Woman's University in Denton, Texas has a replica which was purchased from the Louvre and shipped from Paris in 1982. This replica is actually a replacement of the original 1929 replica given to commemorate Armistice Day and the defeat of autocracy.
- A replica of the statue sits overlooking the Veterans area of the Skylawn Memorial Park in San Mateo, California.
- The Estrugamou Building in Buenos Aires, Argentina was built in four sections, arranged around a patio adorned with a bronze copy of Winged Victory of Samothrace.
- The Cape Town Cenotaph is topped by a replica of the Winged Victory of Samothrace by British sculptor Vernon March.
- A plaster replica adorns the atrium of Technische Universität Berlin. The replica was a gift by French universities to the TU Berlin in 1956.
- The Golden Nica Award presented by the Prix Ars Electronica is a replica of Winged Victory of Samothrace.
- Graffiti artist Banksy created CCTV Angel in 2006 depicting a robed, winged figure with a CCTV camera for a head, as a statement on the overreach with security surveillance in society.
- The first FIFA World Cup Trophy, commissioned in 1930 and designed by Abel Lafleur, was based on the model.

== See also ==
- Nike of Paionios

== Bibliography ==
- Badoud, Nathan (2018). "La Victoire de Samothrace, défaite de Philippe V". Revue Archéologique. 66 (2): 279–306. doi:10.3917/arch.182.0279.
- Basch, Victor (1986). Le musée imaginaire de la marine antique.
- Bernhardt, Johannes Christian (2014). Das Nikemonument von Samothrake und der Kampf der Bilder. Stuttgart.
- Champoiseau, Charles (1880). "La Victoire de Samothrace". Revue Archéologique (1).
- Charbonneaux, Jean (1952). "La main droite de la Victoire de Samothrace". Hesperia. 21 (1): 44–46. doi:10.2307/146937. JSTOR 146937.
- Clinton, Kevin (2020). "The Nike of Samothrace : setting the record straight". American Journal of Archaeology. 124 (4): 551–573. doi:10.3764/aja.124.4.0551. S2CID 226545861.
- Conze, Alexander; Hauser, Aloïs; Benndorf, Otto (1880). Neue Untersuchungen auf Samothrake II. Wien. Archived from the original on 2022-09-08.
- Hamiaux, Marianne (1998). "Musée du Louvre, Les Sculptures grecques t. II". Éditions de la Réunion des musées nationaux. Paris: 27–40.
- Hamiaux, Marianne (2001). "La Victoire de Samothrace : découverte et restauration". Journal des Savants. 1: 153–223. doi:10.3406/jds.2001.1643.
- Hamiaux, Marianne (2004). "La Victoire de Samothrace : étude technique de la statue". Monuments et mémoires de la Fondation Eugène Piot. 83: 61–129. doi:10.3406/piot.2004.1420. Archived from the original on 2024-06-01.
- Hamiaux, Marianne (2006). "La Victoire de Samothrace : construction de la base et reconstitution". Monuments et mémoires de la Fondation Eugène Piot. 85: 5–60. doi:10.3406/piot.2006.1635. Archived from the original on 2024-06-01.
- Hamiaux, Marianne (2007). La Victoire de Samothrace. Paris: coédition Musée du Louvre et Réunion des Musées nationaux.
- Hamiaux, Marianne; Laugier, Ludovic; Martinez, Jean-Luc (2014). The Winged Victory of Samothrace: Rediscovering a Masterpiece. Paris: éditions du Louvre et Somogy éditions d'art.
- Knell, Heiner (1995). Die Nike von Samothrake. Typus, Form, Bedeutung und Wirkungsgeschichte eines rhodischen Sieges-Anathems im Kabirenheiligtum von Samothrake.
- Lehmann, Karl; Lehmann, Phyllis W. (1973). Samothracian Reflections. Princeton University Press. ISBN 9780691099095.
- Lehmann, K. (1998). Samothrace. A guide to the Excavations and the Museum (6th ed.).
- Martinez, Jean-Luc (2014). "La restauration de la Victoire de Samothrace : un projet international de recherche et de restauration du monument, 2013-2015". Comptes rendus des séances de l'Académie des Inscriptions et Belles-Lettres. 158 (2): 933–948. doi:10.3406/crai.2014.95033.
- Morrison, J. S.; Coates, J. F. (1996). Greek and Roman Oared Warships.
- Queyrel, François (2016). La sculpture hellénistique, tome 1. Formes, thèmes et fonctions. Paris: Éditions Picard.
- Rice, E. E. (1991). "The Rhodian Navy in the Hellenistic Age". In Roberts, W.R.; Sweetman, J. (eds.). New Interpretations in Naval History. Naval Institute Press.
- Ridgway, Brunilde Sismondo (2000). Hellenistic Sculpture II. The Styles of ca. 200-100 B.C.
- La Rocca, Eugenio (2018). "La Nike di Samotracia tra Macedoni e Romani : un Riesame del Monumento nel Quadro dell'assimilazione dei Penati agli Dei di Samotracia". Annuario della Scuola Italiana di Atene, Suppl. 1.
- Smith, R. R. R (1991). Hellenistic Sculpture, a handbook. Thames & Hudson.
- Stewart, Andrew (2016). "The Nike of Samothrace: Another View". American Journal of Archaeology. 120 (3): 399–410. doi:10.3764/aja.120.3.0399. S2CID 192588726.
- Thiersch, Hermann (1931). Die Nike von Samothrake, ein rhodisches Werk und Anathem. Weidmann.
