= Samothrace temple complex =

Archaeological site in Greece

Coordinates: 40.5008°N 25.5301°E

Samothrace among the main Greek temples

The Samothrace Temple Complex, known as the Sanctuary of the Great Gods (Modern Greek: Ιερό των Μεγάλων Θεών Ieró ton Megálon Theón), is one of the principal Pan-Hellenic religious sanctuaries, located on the island of Samothrace within the larger Thrace. Built immediately to the west of the ramparts of the city of Samothrace, it was nonetheless independent, as attested to by the dispatch of city ambassadors during festivals.

It was celebrated throughout Ancient Greece for its Mystery religion. Numerous famous people were initiates, including the historian Herodotus, one of very few authors to have left behind a few clues to the nature of the mysteries, the Spartan leader Lysander, and numerous Athenians. The temple complex is mentioned by Plato and Aristophanes.

During the Hellenistic period, after the investiture of Phillip II, it formed a Macedonian national sanctuary where the successors to Alexander the Great vied to outdo each other's munificence. It remained an important religious site throughout the Roman period. Hadrian visited, and Varro described the mysteries. The cult fades from history towards the end of Late Antiquity, when the temple would have been closed during the persecution of pagans in the late Roman Empire.

== Cult of the Great Gods ==
The identity and nature of the deities venerated at the sanctuary remains largely enigmatic, in large part because it was taboo to pronounce their names. Literary sources from antiquity refer to them under the collective name of "Cabeiri" (Greek: Κάβειροι Kábiroi), while they carry the simpler epithet of Gods or Great Gods, which was a title or state of being rather than the actual name, (Μεγάλοι Θεοί Megáloi Theoí) on inscriptions found on the site.

=== The pantheon of Samothrace ===
Site plan of the sanctuary, showing chronology of major construction

The Pantheon of the Great Gods consists of numerous chthonic deities, primarily predating the arrival of Greek colonists on the island in the 7th century BC, and congregating around one central figure – the Great Mother.

- The Great Mother, a goddess often depicted on Samothracian coinage as a seated woman, with a lion at her side. Her original secret name was Axiéros. She is associated with the Anatolian Great Mother, the Phrygian Mount, and the Trojan Mother Goddess of Mount Ida. The Greeks associated her equally with the fertility goddess Demeter. The Great Mother is the all-powerful mistress of the wild world of the mountains, venerated on sacred rocks where sacrifices and offerings were made to her. In the sanctuary of Samothrace, these altars correspond to porphyry outcroppings of various colours (red, green, blue, or grey). For her faithful, her power also manifested itself in veins of magnetic iron, from which they fashioned rings that initiates wore as signs of recognition. A number of these rings were recovered from the tombs in the neighbouring necropolis.
- Hecate, under the name of Zerynthia, and Aphrodite-Zerynthia, two important nature goddesses, are equally venerated at Samothrace, their cult having been distanced from that of the Great Mother and more closely identified with deities more familiar to the Greeks.
- Kadmilos (Καδμίλος), the spouse of Axiéros, is a fertility god identified by the Greeks as Hermes; a phallic deity whose sacred symbols were a ram's head and a baton (kerykeion), which was obviously a phallic symbol and can be found on some currency.
- Two other masculine deities accompany Kadmilos. These may correspond to the two legendary heroes who founded the Samothracean mysteries: the brothers Dardanos (Δάρδανος) and Iasion (Ἰασίων), also called Eetion (Ηετίων). They are associated by the Greeks with the Dioscuri, divine twins popular as protectors of mariners in distress.
- A pair of underworld deities, Axiokersos and Axiokersa, are identified to Hades and Persephone, but do not appear to be part of the original group of pre-Hellenic deities. The legend (familiar to the Greeks) of the rape of the goddess of fertility by the god of the underworld also plays a part in the sacred dramas celebrated at Samothrace; although less so than at Eleusis.
- During a later period this same myth was associated with that of the marriage of Cadmos and Harmony, possibly due to a similarity of names to Kadmilos and Electra.

=== The rituals ===
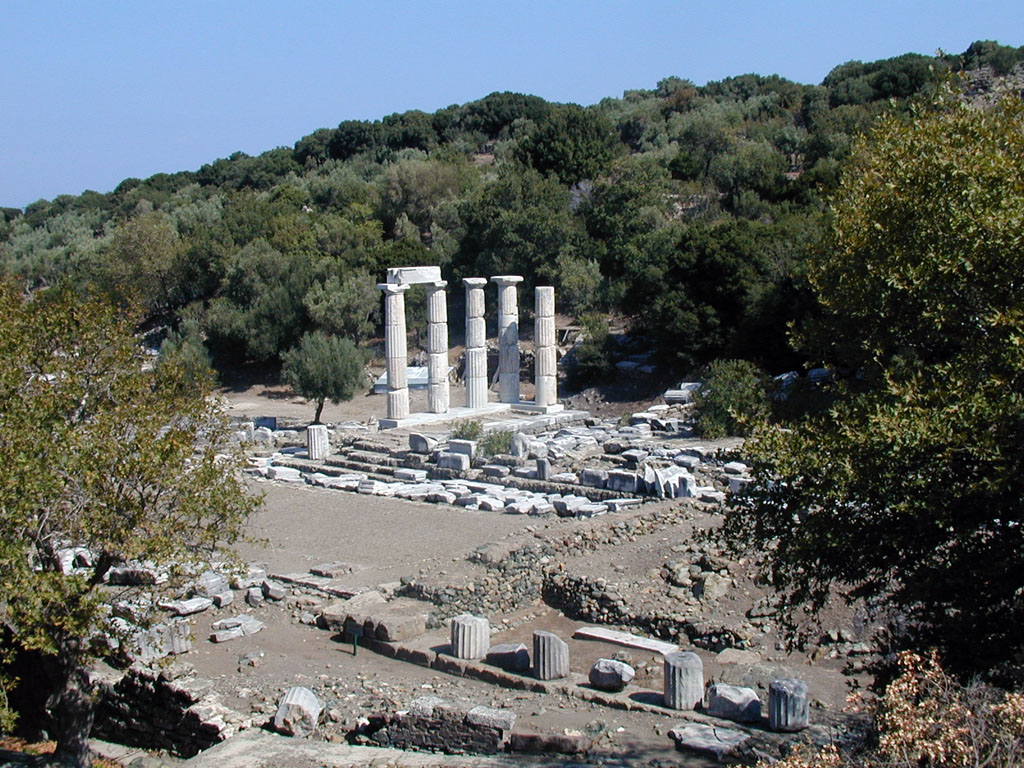
General view of the remains of Hieron, from the southwest (site plan, number 13)

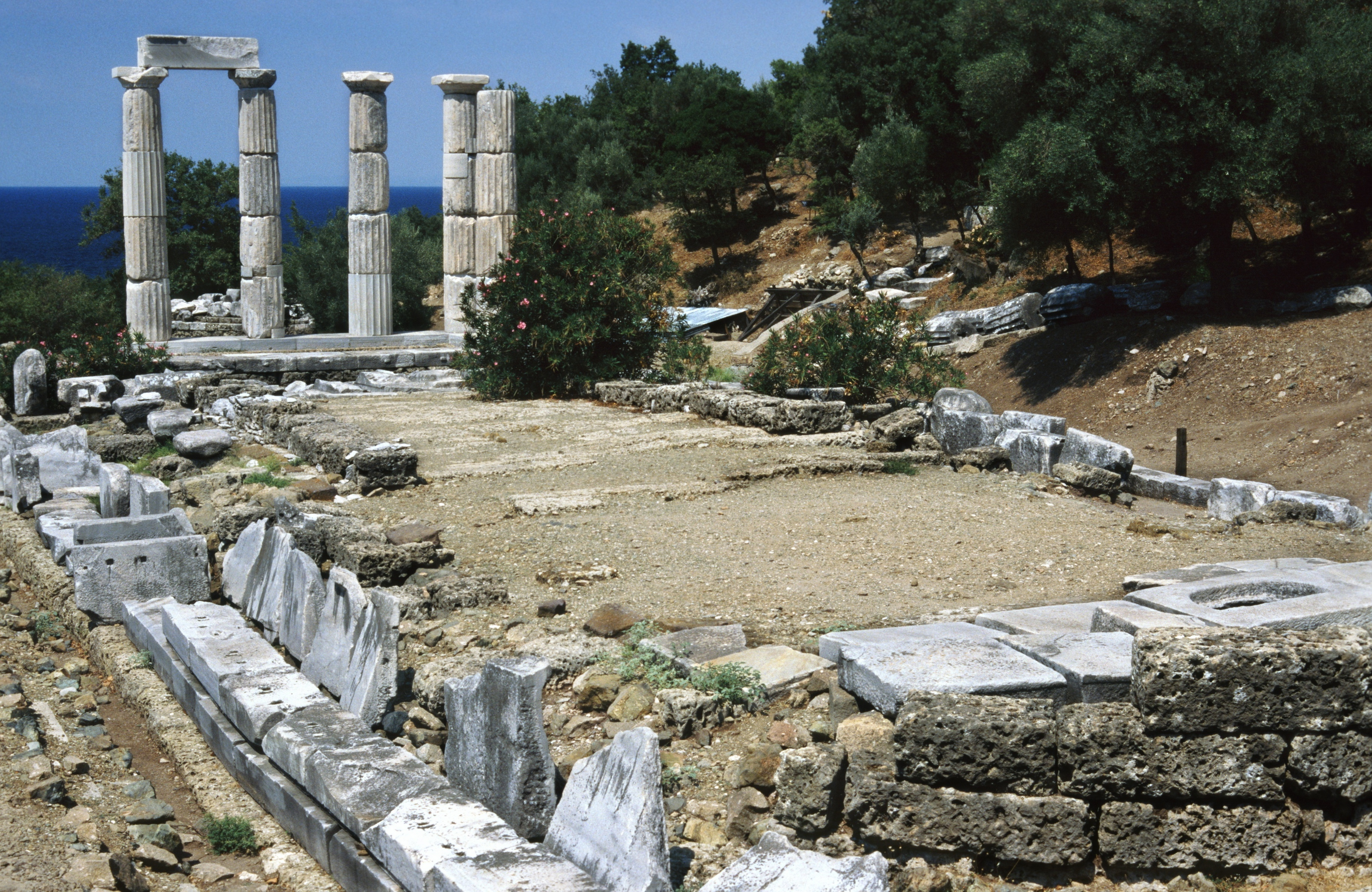
A picturesque view of the Hieron

The whole of the sanctuary was open to all who wished to worship the Great Gods, although access to buildings consecrated to the mysteries was understood to be reserved for initiates. These rituals and ceremonies were presided over by the priestess in service to the people. The head priestess, and often a prophetess, was titled a Sybil, or Cybele.

The most common rituals were indistinguishable from practice at other Greek sanctuaries. Prayer and supplications accompanied by blood sacrifices of domestic animals (sheep and pigs) burnt in sacred hearths (εσχάραι eschárai), as well as libations made to the chthonic deities in circular or rectangular ritual pits (βόθρος bóthros). A large number of rock altars were used, the largest of which was surrounded by a monumental enclosure at the end of the 4th century BC (site plan, number 11).

The major annual festival, which drew envoys to the island from throughout the Greek world, probably took place in mid-July. It consisted of the presentation of a sacred play, which entailed a ritual wedding (ιερός γάμος hierós gámos); this may have taken place in the building with the Dancer's Wall which was built in the 4th century BC. During this era the belief arose that the search for the missing maiden, followed by her marriage to the god of the underworld, represented the marriage of Cadmos and Harmonia. The frieze (see photo below) on which the Temenos is indicated may be an allusion to this marriage. Around 200 BC, a Dionysian competition was added to the festival, facilitated by the construction of a theatre (site plan, number 10) opposite the great altar (site plan, number 11). According to local myth, it is in this era that the city of Samothrace honoured a poet of Iasos in Caria for having composed the tragedy Dardanos and having effected other acts of good will around the island, the city, and the sanctuary.

Numerous votive offerings were made at the sanctuary, which were placed in a building made for the purpose next to the great altar (site plan, number 12). Offerings could be statues of bronze, marble or clay, weapons, vases, etc. However, due to Samothrace's location on busy maritime routes the cult was particularly popular and numerous often very modest offerings found their way there: excavations have turned up seashells and fish hooks offered by mariners or fishermen who were likely thanking the divinities for having protected them from the dangers of the sea.

=== The initiation ===
A unique feature of the Samothracean mystery cult was its openness: as compared to the Eleusinian Mysteries, the initiation had no prerequisites for age, gender, status or nationality. Everyone, men and women, adults and children, Greeks and non-Greeks, the free, the indentured, or the enslaved could participate. Nor was the initiation confined to a specific date and the initiate could on the same day attain two successive degrees of the mystery. The only condition, in fact, was to be present in the sanctuary.

The first stage of the initiation was the myesis (μύησις). A sacred account and special symbols were revealed to the mystes (μύστης); that is to say the initiate. In this fashion, Herodotus was given a revelation concerning the significance of phallic images of Hermes-Kadmilos. According to Varro, the symbols revealed on this occasion symbolized heaven and earth. In return for this revelation, which was kept secret, the initiate was given the assurance of certain privileges: Hope for a better life, and more particularly protection at sea, and possibly, as at Eleusis, the promise of a happy afterlife. During the ceremony the initiate received a crimson sash knotted around the waist that was supposed to be a protective talisman. An iron ring exposed to the divine power of magnetic stones was probably another symbol of protection conferred during the initiation.

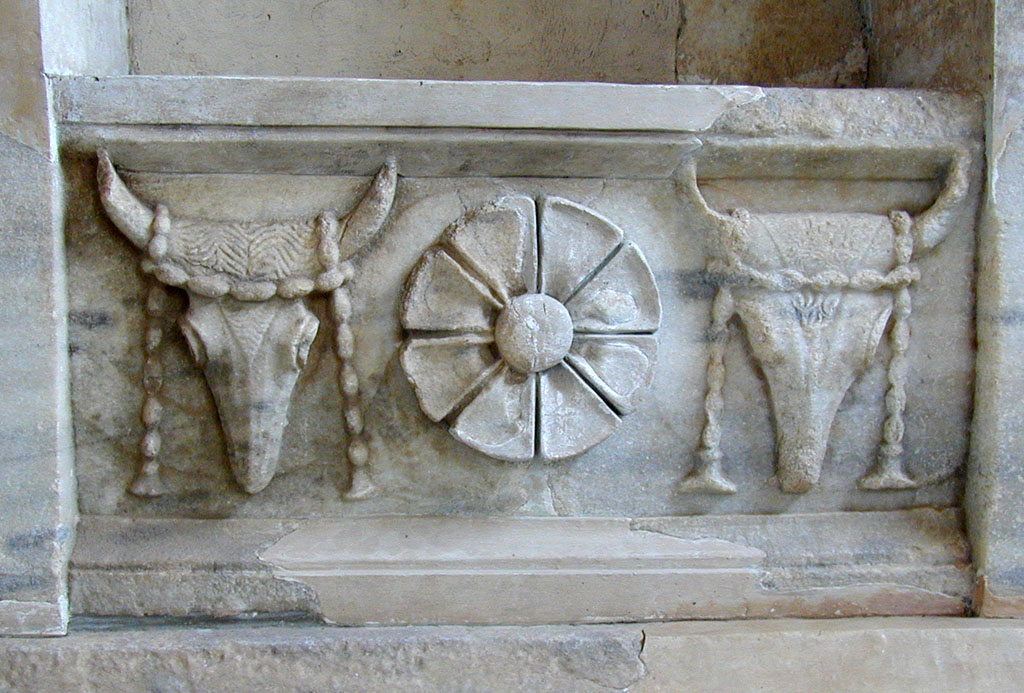
Frieze with bulls from the Arsinoé rotunda (Samothrace Museum) (site plan, number 15)

The preparation for the initiation took place in a small room south of the Anaktoron (site plan, number 16; literally the House of the Lords), a type of sacristy where the initiate was dressed in white and was given a lamp. The myesis then took place in the Anaktoron, a large hall capable of accommodating numerous already initiated faithful, who would attend the ceremony seated on benches along the walls. The initiate carried out a ritual washing in a basin situated in the southeast corner and then made a libation to the gods in a circular pit. At the end of the ceremony, the initiate took his place seated on a round wooden platform facing the principal door while ritual dances took place around him. He was then taken to the north chamber, the sanctuary where he received the revelation proper. Access to this sanctuary was forbidden to non-initiates. The initiate was given a document attesting to his initiation in the mysteries and could, at least during the later period, pay to have his name engraved on a commemorative plaque.

The second degree of the initiation was called the epoptia (εποπτεία, literally, the contemplation). Unlike the one year interval between degrees which was demanded at Eleusis, the second degree at Samothrace could be obtained immediately after the myesis. In spite of this, it was only realized by a small number of initiates, which leads us to believe that it involved some difficult conditions, though it is unlikely that these conditions were financial or social. Lehman assessed that it concerned moral issues, as the candidate was auditioned and required to confess his sins. This audition took place overnight in front of the Hieron (site plan, number 13; literally the holy place). A foundation was recovered here which could have supported a giant torch; generally speaking, the discovery of numerous lamps and torch supports throughout this site confirms the nocturnal nature of the initiation rites. After the interrogation and the eventual absolution awarded by the priest or official the candidate was brought into the Hieron, which also functioned as an epoption (place of contemplation) where ritual cleansing took place and sacrifice was made into a sacred hearth located in the center of the "holy of holies". The initiate then went to an apse in the rear of the building, which was probably intended to resemble a grotto. The hierophant (ιεροφάντης hierophántes), otherwise known as the initiator, took his place on a platform (βήμα béma), in the apse where he recited the liturgy and displayed the symbols of the mysteries.

During the Roman era, towards 200 AD, the entrance to the Hieron was modified to permit the entrance of live sacrificial offerings. A parapet was constructed in the interior to protect the spectators and a crypt was fitted into the apse. These modifications permitted the celebration of the Kriobolia and the Taurobolia of the Anatolian Magna Mater, which were introduced to the epopteia at this time. The new rites saw the initiate, or possibly only the priest by proxy, descend into a pit in the apse. The blood of the sacrificial animals then flowed over him or her in the fashion of a baptismal rite.

== Description of the sanctuary ==
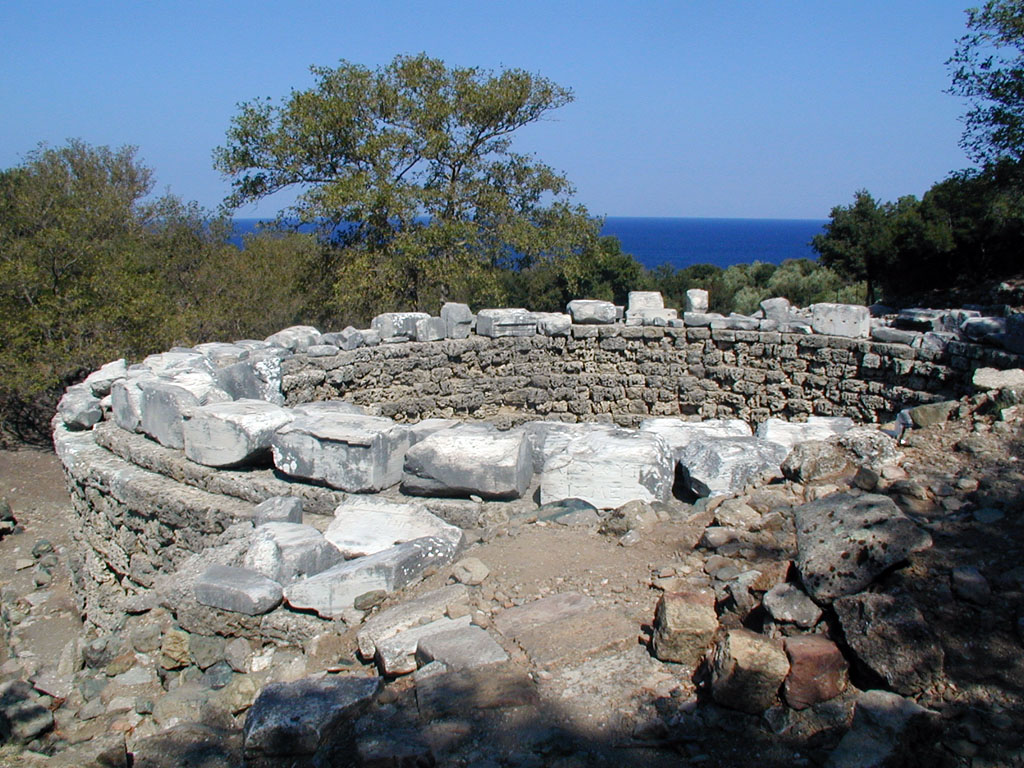
Foundation of the Arsinoé Rotunda and fragment of the dedication (site plan number 15)

The Samothrace site may appear to be somewhat confusing at first glance; this is due to a combination of the unusual topography and the two century long period over which the site was developed. The sanctuary occupies three narrow terraces on the west slopes of mount Hagios Georgios, separated by two steep-banked torrents. The entrance is in the east through the Ptolemy II propylaeum, also known as the Ptolemaion (site plan number 20), which used to span the eastern brook and function as a bridge, until destroyed by an earthquake. Remains of the former bridge can still be seen in the stream bed below. Immediately to the west, on the first terrace, there is a somewhat circular paved depression, containing an altar in the centre, which was undoubtedly a sacrificial area; although the precise function of this place has not further been determined.

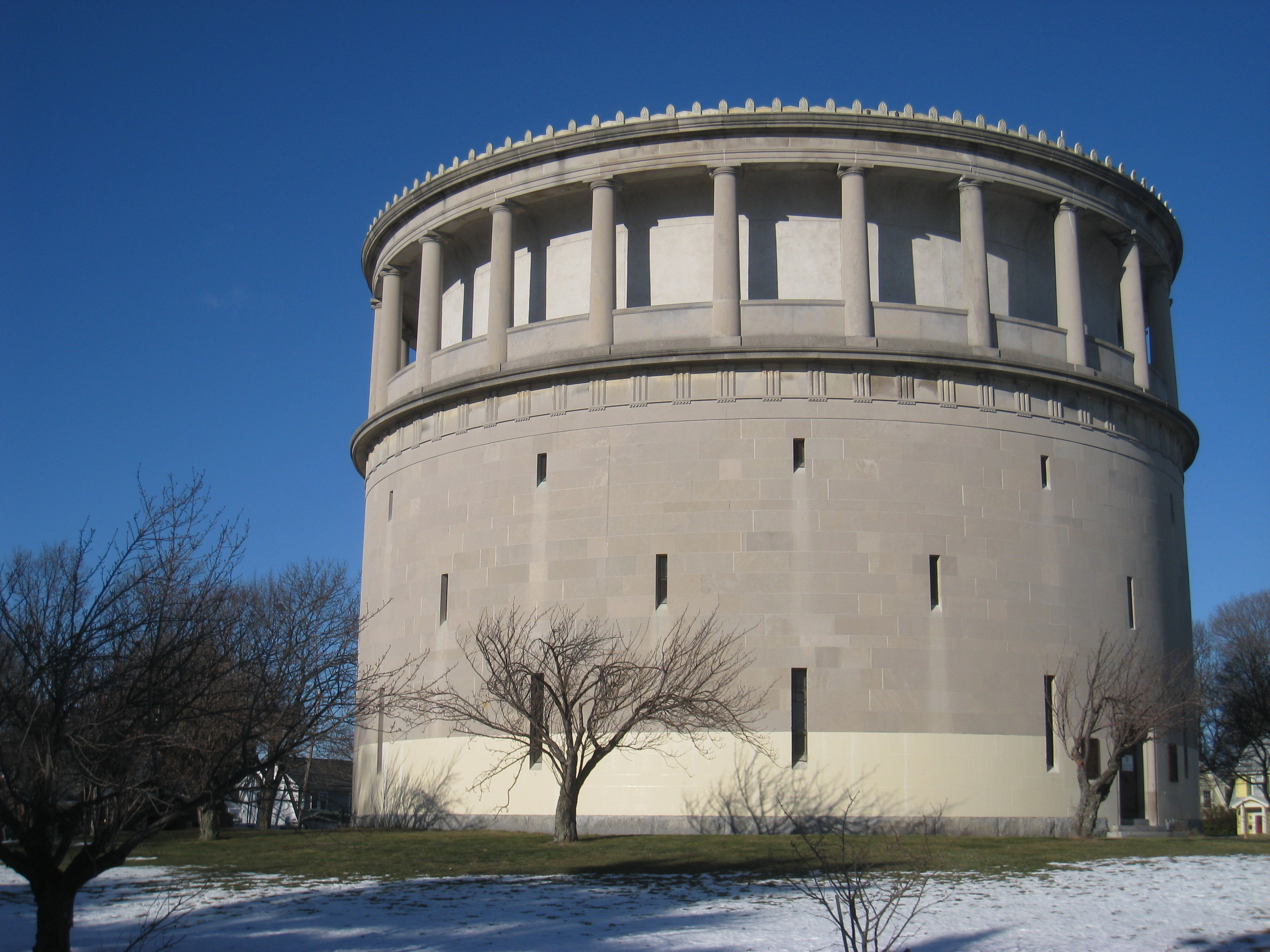
Arlington Reservoir, Massachusetts, 1930s, a 2,000,000 gallon water tower based on the Arsinoeum

A winding path descends towards the main terrace, between two brooks, where the main monuments to the cult can be found. A large tholos, the Arsinoëion, or Arsinoë Rotunda (site plan number 15), the largest covered round space in the ancient Greek world (20 m or 66 ft in diameter), may have served to welcome the theoroi, sacred ambassadors delegated by cities and associations to attend the great festivals at the sanctuary. The decoration of rosettes and garlanded bull's heads leads some to believe that sacrifices may have also taken place here. The rotunda was built on an older building of which only the foundation has remained. The Arlington Massachusetts Reservoir, a 2,000,000 gallon water tank, is based on one of the reconstructions of the rotunda.

Right at the opening of the path leading to the sanctuary, one finds the largest building, the Building of the Dancer's Frieze (site plan number 14), sometimes called the Temenos, as it corresponds to a monumental enclosure marking a much older sacrificial area. There is a great deal of variance in reconstructed plans for this portion of the site (compare for example the different editions of Lehman's archeological guide – the plan used in this article reflects the 4th edition). It is in essence a simple court preceded by an ionic propylaeum decorated with the well-known dancer's frieze (photo below). The celebrated architect Scopas may have been the designer.

The most important building of the cult, the epopteion, is located to the south of the Temenos. This building bears the inscription of Hieron (site plan number 13). It is not known who dedicated this building, but given the magnificence was likely a royal. It is some type of temple, but there is no peripteros (surround of columns) and only a single prostyle (partly restored – see photo above). The architectural ornamentation of the facade is noteworthy for its elegance. The interior boasts the largest unsupported span in the ancient Greek world – 11 metres. The south end of this building is an apse, which constitutes the most sacred portion. This apse may represent, according to R. Ginouvès, a grotto for conducting chthonic rituals. The main altar, and the building for displaying votive offerings, are located to the west of the Hieron (site plan numbers 11 & 12).

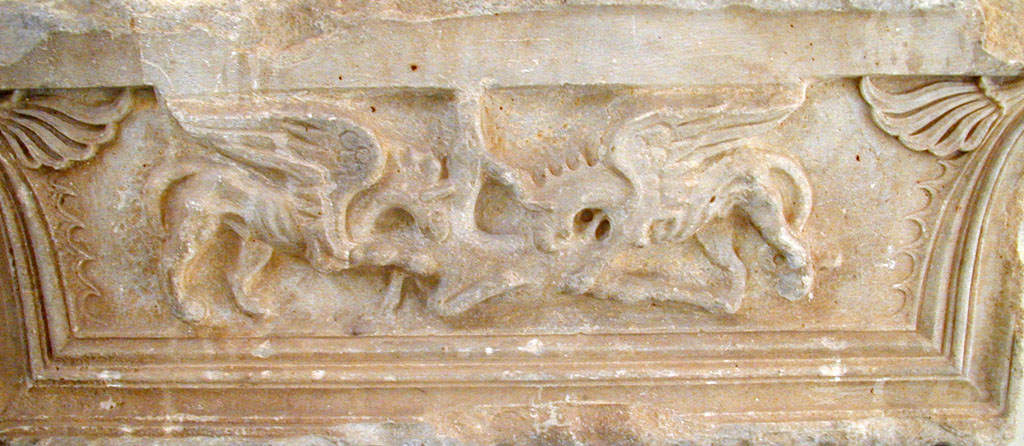
Capital of the front of the west facade of the Ptolemy II Propylaeum: Griffons devouring a doe (site plan number 20)

The Anaktoron, the building for greeting the myesis, is located north of the Arsinoë Rotunda, though the version currently visible dates to the imperial era.

The third and final terrace, West of the spiritual centre of the sanctuary, is primarily occupied by votive buildings such as the Miletean Building, so named as it was dedicated by a citizen of Miletus (site plan number 5), and the Neorion, or naval monument (site plan number 6). It is also the location of a banquet hall (site plan number 7). Three other small Hellenistic treasures are not well known (site plan, numbers 1 to 3). Overlooking the central terrace, the space is above all dominated by a very large portico (104 m or 341 ft long; site plan number 8) which acts as a monumental backdrop to the sanctuary, above the theatre.

It is in this area of the site that the most recent traces of occupation can be found: a square Byzantine fort in effect built of treasure; as it re-used building material from the original site.

Diodorus Siculus (III.55) relates a legend of the temple being founded by Myrina, before she was defeated by Mopsus and Sipylus, and slain:

After that, while subduing some of the rest of the islands, she was caught in a storm, and after she had offered up prayers for her safety to the Mother of the Gods, she was carried to one of the uninhabited islands; this island, in obedience to a vision which she beheld in her dreams, she made sacred to this goddess, and set up altars there and offered magnificent sacrifices. She also gave it the name of Samothrace, which means, when translated into Greek, 'Sacred Island', although some historians say that it was formerly called Samos and was then given the name of Samothrace by Thracians who at one time dwelt on it. However, after the Amazons had returned to the continent, the myth relates, the Mother of the Gods, well pleased with the island, settled in it certain other people, and also her own sons, who are known by the name of Corybantes; who their father was, is handed down in their rites as a matter not to be divulged; and she established the mysteries which are now celebrated on the island and ordained by law that the sacred area should enjoy the right of sanctuary.

== An ancient Macedonian national sanctuary ==
And we are told that Philip, after being initiated into the mysteries of Samothrace at the same time with Olympias, he himself being still a youth and she an orphan child, fell in love with her and betrothed himself to her at once with the consent of her brother, Arymbas.

— Plutarch, Life of Alexander, II, 2

According to Plutarch, this is how Macedonian king Philip II met his future spouse Olympias, the Epirote princess of the Aeacid dynasty, during their initiation to the mysteries of Samothrace. This historical anecdote defines the Argead dynasty's allegiance to the sanctuary, followed by the two dynasties of the Diadochi: the Ptolemaic dynasty and the Antigonid dynasty, who continually attempted to outdo one another in the 3rd century BC, during their alternating periods of domination over the island and more generally the Northern Aegean.

The first sovereign of whom epigraphic traces remain was the son of Philip II and half-brother of Alexander, Philip III of Macedon, who would be the principal benefactor of the Sanctuary during the 4th century BC: he probably commissioned the Temenos by 340 BC, the Main Altar in the next decade, and the Hieron by 325 BC, as well as the Doric monument and the border of the eastern circular area; these were dedicated in his name as well as that of his nephew Alexander IV of Macedon, who jointly ruled from 323–317 BC.

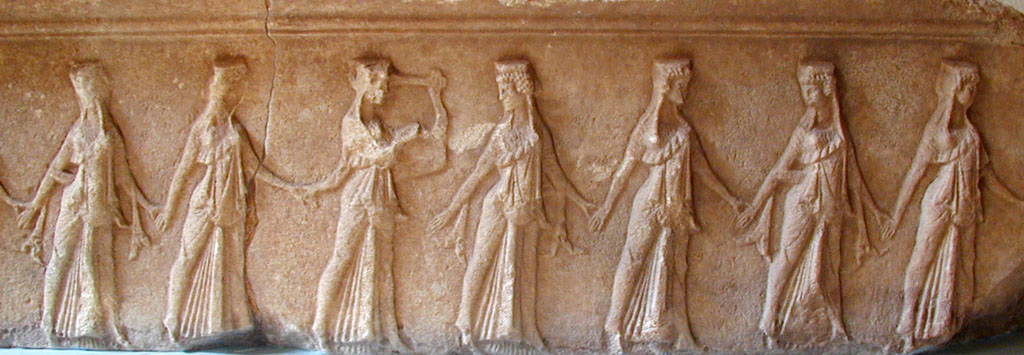
Dancer's Frieze from the Temenos (site plan number 14)

The second surge of major construction commence started in the 280s with the Arsinoe II Rotunda, which may date from the period (288–281 BC) when this daughter of Ptolemy I was married to the Diadochus Lysimachus, then king of Macedon. Widowed after his death in battle in 281 BC, she married her half-brother, Ptolemy Keraunos and later her brother Ptolemy II in 274 BC. Of the monumental dedication which surmounted the door, only a single block remains, and it is thus not possible to determine the complete inscription. Ptolemy II himself had the Propylaeum built across the entrance to the sanctuary: the powerful Ptolemaic fleet which allowed him to dominate the bulk of the Aegean up to the Thracian coast, and the construction at Samothrace bear witness to his influence.

The re-establishment of the Antigonid dynasty on the Macedonian throne with Antigonus II Gonatas, soon led to a clash for maritime supremacy on the Aegean; Antigonus Gonatas celebrated his victory at the naval battle of Kos by dedicating one of his victorious ships to the shrine by 255–245 BC, displayed in a building constructed on an ad hoc basis on the west terrace: the Neorion (site plan number 6). It may have been inspired by another Neorion, at Delos, probably built at the end of the 4th century BC, which he re-used and dedicated to another of his ships at the same time.

The naval war between the Ptolemies and the Antigonids continued intermittently through the second half of the 3rd century BC, until Philip V of Macedon, the last Antigonid king to attempt to establish a Macedonian thalassocracy, was finally beaten by an alliance between Rhodes and Pergamon. A monumental column was dedicated to him in front to the large stoa of the upper terrace by the Macedonians by 200 BC. It was probably during one of these episodes that the monumental fountain containing a ship's prow of limestone and the famous Winged Victory of Samothrace statue were built. This could actually be a dedication from Rhodes rather than Macedon, as analysis of the limestone used for the prow and the type of vessel indicated that it came from Rhodes.

The sanctuary became the final refuge for the last king of Macedon, Perseus of Macedon, who went to the island after his defeat at the Battle of Pydna in 168 BC and was there arrested by the Romans.

== Site exploration ==
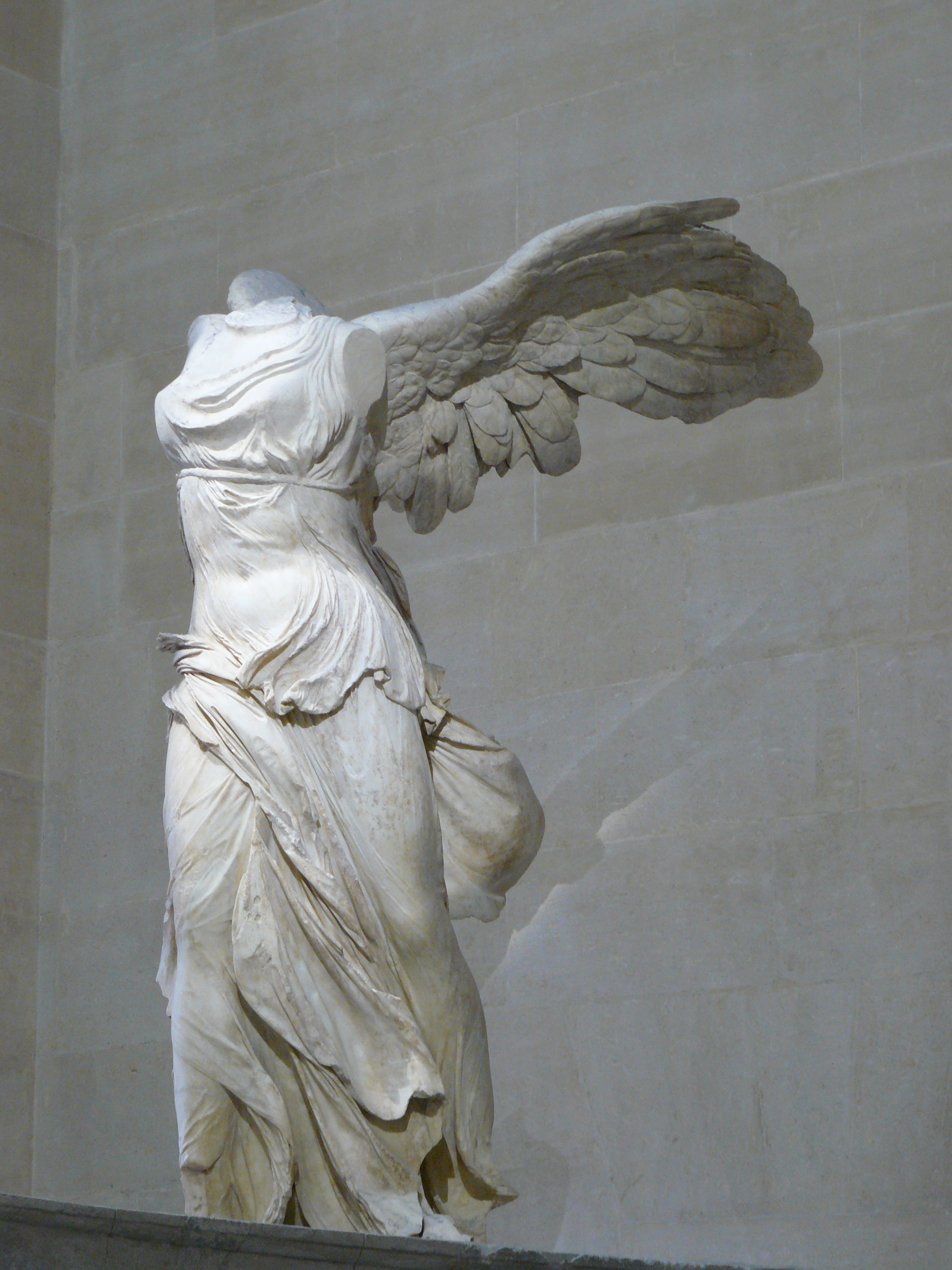
Winged Victory of Samothrace, displayed in the Louvre (site plan number 9)

Fascination with mystery religions renewed interest in the site during the 17th and 18th centuries. Following the 1863 discovery of the Winged Victory of Samothrace statue – now in the Louvre – by French consul Charles Champoiseau (posted to Adrianople), the French team of Deville and Coquart carried out the first archeological digs of the site in 1866. The Austrian A. Conze was next to excavate the site in 1873 and 1876: he cleared the Ptolémaion and the stoa and carried out some superficial digs at the Hiéron, the Arsinoéion as well as the Temenos. This work was published in two volumes of unusually high quality for the time. Under an agreement with the Turkish government, the Austrians shared their discoveries: numerous architectural fragments went to the Vienna Kunsthistorisch Museum, while others were sent to Gallipoli and then on to the Istanbul Archeological Museum — part of this material unfortunately disappeared in transit. Champoiseau returned in 1891 to look for the blocks which formed the ship's prow upon which the Winged Victory of Samothrace statue had been installed in Paris, and at this time discovered the theatre. The École française d'Athènes and the Charles University in Prague (Salač and Fernand Chapouthuer) also carried out joint work between 1923 and 1927, before the Institute of Fine Arts (at New York University) started their first excavations in 1938, which uncovered the Anaktoron. Interrupted by the war, during which time the site suffered greatly as a result of Bulgarian occupation, they returned in 1948 and continue to the present. In 1956 a partial reconstruction (anastylosis) of the Hiéron facade was carried out.

== See also ==
- Ancient Greek religion
- Mystery religion
- Eleusinian Mysteries
