= Pelcis =

Coordinates: 35°16′32″N 23°40′06″E

Pelcis or Pelkis (Ancient Greek: Πελκις) was a town of ancient Crete. It is mentioned in a theorodokoi decree dated to c. 230-220 BCE.

Its site is tentatively located near modern Kontokynigi.
