= Hyporeiae =

Epirus in antiquity

Hyporeiae or Hyporeiai (Ancient Greek: Ὑπώρειαι) was an ancient Greek town located in the region of Acarnania. Its exact location is unknown, although it has been suggested that it should be located in the east of Acarnania, in the border area with Aetolia.

== History ==
Hyporeiae is known through two epigraphic testimonies beginning with a mention of the appointment of the town's theorodokos in circa 356/355 BCE to receive the theoroi of Epidaurus. Also, the town's name also appears in a 4th-century BC funerary inscription from Athens.

== See also ==
- List of cities in ancient Epirus
