= Neorion (ancient Greece) =

Type of classical Greek commemorative monument

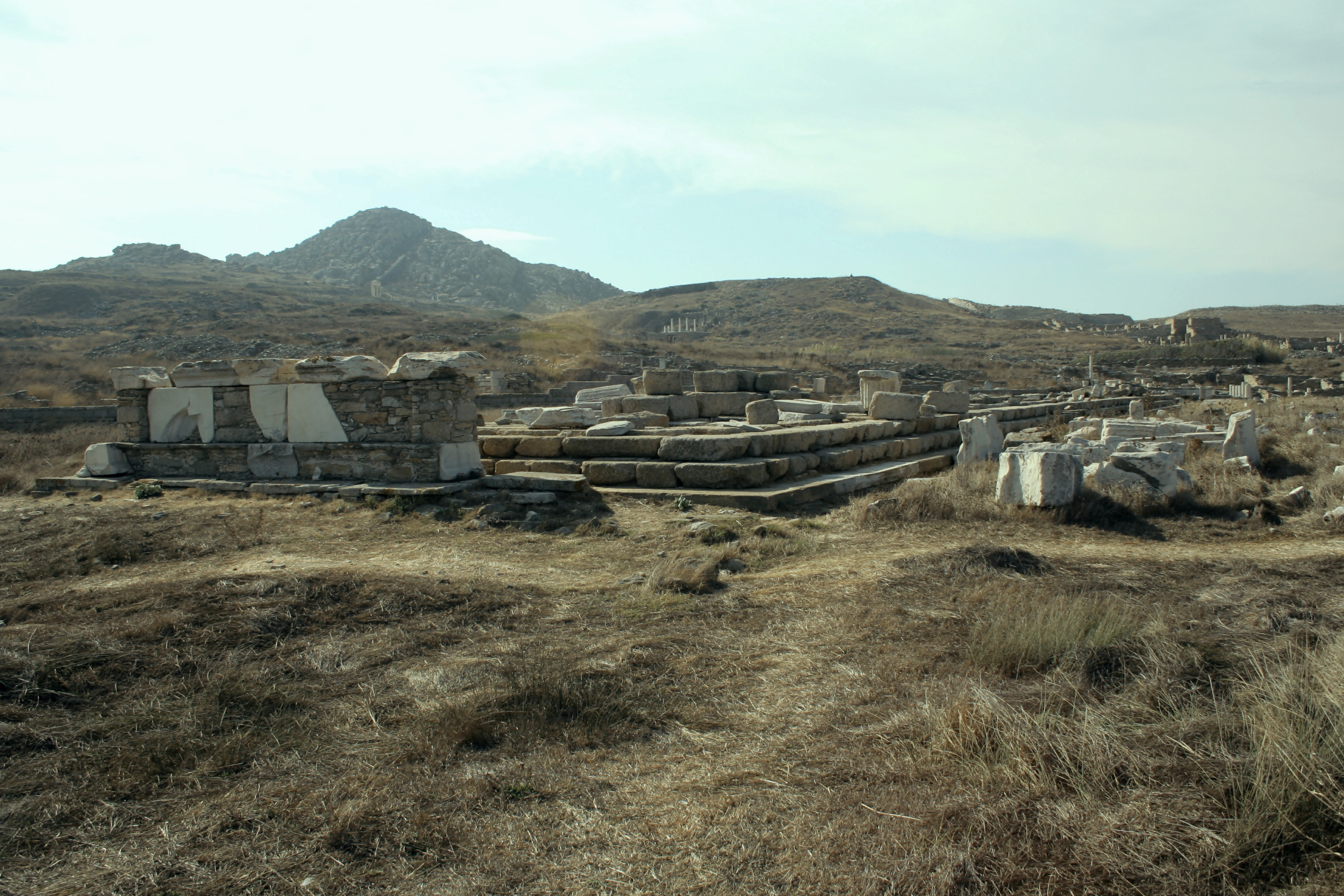
A néôrion in Delos ("monument of the bulls")

A néôrion (in Ancient Greek, τὸ νεώριον tò néôrion) is a type of classical Greek commemorative monument designed to celebrate a naval victory. It is a long gallery in which a ship is displayed (hence the name), occasionally one of the enemy, in honour of the battle.

Neorion in Greek is also a term describing a port facility where ship construction and repair takes place (like the famous Neorion areas in Herakleion, Crete, built by the Venetians).

== Examples ==
- At the Sanctuary of the Great Gods at Samothrace.
- At the sanctuary of Apollo at Delos, a neorion contained the flagship of Antigonus II Gonatas which he offered to celebrate the victory at Kos against the Ptolemaics in 255 BC. This Neorion is believed to have been built on the site of a previous one.
