= Neorion at Samothrace =

Monumental structure in the Samothrace Temple Complex

The Samothrace sanctuary is located in the Northern Aegean Sea, shown here among other Greek sanctuaries.

The neorion at Samothrace was a long, rectangular, monumental structure built to house a dedicatory ship to the gods at the Sanctuary of the Great Gods on the Greek island of Samothrace in the northern Aegean Sea. It consisted of two main chambers: one in which an entire ship was displayed on marble supports, and a place where visitors to the building could view said ship. It is posited that the structure was built between 300 and 250 BCE. Neorions are found at few other places in Greece, but oftentimes they displayed captured warships of the enemy as their centerpiece; however, there is some debate as to what sort of ship exactly was housed within the neorion at the sanctuary on Samothrace.

== Description ==
=== Location and materials ===
Site plan of the sanctuary complex at Samothrace. The neorion is denoted as number 6.

The neorion is built on the western hill of the sanctuary on Samothrace (number 6 in the site plan to the right).

Materials used in its construction were local sandstone covered in plaster, imported marble from the nearby island of Thasos, and wood.

=== Architecture ===
The monument was "divided longitudinally by a colonnade and [wooden] grille... lighted by large windows" at each end of the building and along one side. People who came to the neorion at the time of its initial construction would have had a clear view of the Aegean from the vantage point of the building; visitors would have entered through two large doors, framed with Thasian marble in the Doric style, on the Northern side of the structure where votive dedications could also be offered. The imported marble was also used in supports to hold up the ship housed along the entire length of the Southern gallery. Due to the layout of the neorion, visitors would have only been able to see one side of the ship through the wooden grille between the columns.

=== Size ===
While the building itself is roughly eighty feet long and forty feet in width (28.7m x 13.5m), due to the division of the gallery the ship itself could have only been about twelve feet (4 m) wide; based on the supports, the ship appeared to have a symmetrical keel.

== Archaeology ==
=== Theories ===
It is not clear to archaeologists and historians exactly what sort of ship was housed in the neorion or by whom it was dedicated, however there are several hypotheses.

Theories posited by scholars at Emory University are that "[t]he Neorion could have housed a ship captured in battle, or one that brought victory, salvation or profit."

According to de Grummond, "both the building and the ship may have been a gift of Antigonos Gonatas of Macedon." Other historians have argued that "the building housed the escape ship that Arsinoe used to flee Ephesos following the battle at Kouropedion in 281." This potential origin for the ship could help explain the relatively small size of the vessel (compared to a larger warship as exampled in the neorion at the Sanctuary of Apollo at Delos). Constantakopoulou argues that since the sanctuary had "strong maritime overtones," the presence of a ship that garnered safe voyage for its passenger would make sense as "protection at sea was one of the main rationales for participating in the Samothracian Mysteries."

=== Other finds within the Neorion ===
A half-life-sized marble head of "the Great Mother" goddess, a "syncretistic goddess, who was associated with both Asia and Greece", was found at the neorion site in 1988. Due to its size, Katherine Welch argues that it was a votive, dedicatory statue rather than a cult statue; she also comments that this particular find is important in understanding the larger context of Samothracian and Greek portrayal of this important deity. While not commenting on the location of the find, she states that this particular artifact found at the neorion site is "unique in being the only representation of a principle deity of the Samothracian mystery cult to have been found on this island."
