= Theorodokoi =

The theorodokoi (Greek: θεωροδόκοι, θεαροδόκοι) in ancient Greece were sacred envoy-receivers whose duty was to host and assist the theoroi (θεωροί, "viewers") before the Panhellenic games and festivals.

A theorodokos was sometimes appointed by the community in which he lived but sometimes by the community that sent out the theoroi. To have a favorable report from the theoroi visiting the host city for a festival or games, the city-state assigned an affluent person to be a theorodokos. This was because in most cases the theorodokos was to bear the cost of hosting the theoroi, and to have adequate accommodations for the theoroi, the theorodokoi needed sufficient personal wealth. To have the desired favorable report from a theoros, the theoros was offered gifts, food, and even money to cover the cost of their travel to the hosting city-state.
