= Theoroi =

Envoys sent by Ancient Greek city-states to organize games or festivals

The theoroi (Ancient Greek: θεωροί or θεαροί) in ancient Greece were sacred ambassadors, messengers sent out by the state which was about to organize a Panhellenic game or festival. Theoroi were both received and hosted by the theorodokoi. In the classical Greek world, theoroi meant something like "observers" and they were envoys sent by city-states to consult oracles, to give offerings at famous shrines or attend festivals.

== History ==
=== Etymology and purpose ===
Theoria was a word that referred to the duties of the theoroi; it came to mean any act of observing, and was used by Greek philosophers, generally, in the sense of "contemplation". The meaning of the term theoria possibly gives insight into the original purpose that the theoroi held, as they are thought to have been originally to oversee the games or festivals they were attending. As time went on their roles became more significant and their purpose evolved to be much more important in the setting up and execution of the events that took place.

Theoroi were critical in establishing and maintaining international relations between the various ancient Greek poleis. These ambassadors were sent a few months before the games were to start. They traveled all across the ancient Greek world to make contact with all ancient Greek city-states. Once they entered a polis and were received by a designated host, also known as theorodokoi, they announced the exact date of the relevant Panhellenic Game, and declared what became known as an Olympic Truce. This declaration by the theoroi was essential because it ensured safe passage of spectators and competitors to the Panhellenic Game or Festival by mandating that all warfare that would interfere cease immediately.

Theoroi were also seen as somewhat sacred figures and were treated in a very respectful manner. Aside from being received by a designated host in each city they traveled to, they were also given other special privileges. City-states also sent their own theoroi to the games or festival with their athletes or spectators as representatives of their city-state for the event. These theoroi took part in many of the sacred rituals or sacrifices for the event, as well as, had their own personal honorary seats for observing the festival or game. One such responsibility that was quite common and seen as important, was to perform the sacrifice at a festival. The city-state sending the theoroi set aside enough funds for the theoroi to perform the necessary sacrifice, and give it to the theoroi before he made his journey abroad. These seemingly basic honors served to show the respect each Greek polis had for each other, allowing them to maintain a healthy relationship. In one instance two theoroi were sent from Priene to Athens bearing gifts of food and arms. This was to show the Athenians that the polis of Priene wanted to extend their goodwill to the Athenians and wanted to participate in the event that was being hosted by Athens. In addition to informal acts of creating good relations between city-states, theoroi may have been used for a more direct means of establishing relationships. For example, a theoroi named Demosthenes from Olympia, sought to use his position as architheoros as a way of gaining an audience with Nikanor to discuss a decree that had been made. These traveling ambassadors were in many ways a much needed commonality between each Greek city-state and allowed them to maintain ties to one another.

=== Selection and societal role ===
Those chosen to be theoroi for their specific city-states were from the elites of that city-state. They were prominent members in society in order to give a good impression and handle their ambassadorship appropriately. They also were typically chosen by their representative city-state as a group of three for each event. This caused many of the powerful people from each polis to meet semi-regularly, allowing for people from the ruling classes of each polis (depending on the governmental structure of that polis), to establish relationships and possibly create friendly ties between their respective city-states. These regular meetings between the theoroi at festivals and games also allowed for the theoroi of a city-state to become more aware of happenings outside of their polis, and report back to their city-state when they returned. For example, theoroi from Athens attended a festival during the Peloponnesian War and learned of plans made by Sparta and Chios, which were to overthrow the Athenian influence in Chios. When they returned they were able to inform the Athenians and take measures to prevent this from happening.

=== Ancient inscriptions ===
In 2008, Nora A. Dimitrova published 171 inscriptions related to the theoroi and initiates sent by ancient Greek city-states to the island of Samothrace, dating from 180 BC to 186 AD; these inscriptions were found on the island of Samothrace and personally inspected by Nora, either on the island or wherever they had been taken after their discovery. The initiates and theoroi are thought to have been sent by over 70 identified city states in the ancient Greek World, with most of the theoroi inscriptions being dated to the older part of the time period.
