= Chì mi na mòrbheanna =

Traditional Scottish Gaelic Song

"Chì mi na mòrbheanna" (bagpipe instrumental)
Performed by the United States Air Force Reserve Pipe Band

Chì mi na mòrbheanna (commonly known in English as Mist Covered Mountains) is a Scottish Gaelic song that was written in 1856 by Highlander John Cameron. The song's tune was performed on the bagpipes during the state funerals of John F. Kennedy in 1963, former Prime Minister of the United Kingdom, Winston Churchill in 1965, Queen Elizabeth The Queen Mother in 2002, Queen Elizabeth II in 2022, former Ontario Lieutenant Governor David Onley in 2023 and former Canadian Prime Minister Brian Mulroney in 2024.

== Composition ==
The song was composed in 1856 by John Cameron (Iain Camshron), a native of Ballachulish and known locally in the Gaelic fashion as Iain Rob and Iain Òg Ruaidh. He worked in the slate quarries before moving to Glasgow where he was engaged as a ship's broker. He became the Bard of the Glasgow Ossianic Society and also Bard to Clan Cameron. He returned to carry on a merchant's business along with his elder brother and to cultivate a small croft at Taigh a' Phuirt, Glencoe, in his beloved Highlands. Other songs and odes appeared in The Oban Times and in various song books. He was buried in St. Munda's Isle in Loch Leven. Wreaths of oak leaves and ivy covered the bier The song is a longing for home and, with its wistful, calming melody and traditional ballad rhythms, is often used as a lullaby.

== Usage ==
A Gaelic arrangement of the song was recorded by Cape Breton, Nova Scotia folk singer John Allan Cameron on his 1973 album "Lord Of The Dance", and by The Rankin Family on their debut album (1989).

The song's tune was played on the bagpipes during the funerals of Queen Elizabeth II, Queen Elizabeth the Queen Mother, John F. Kennedy, Joe Strummer and Brian Mulroney.

This song is commonly known in English as "The Mist-Covered Mountains of Home," and under that title it has been recorded by many artists, including John Renbourn, Mark Knopfler, Johnny Cunningham, Nightnoise (at the time including Johnny Cunningham) and Quadriga Consort.

== Lyrics ==
Here are eight verses.

=== Original Scottish Gaelic ===
Sèist:

O, chì, chì mi na mòrbheanna;
O, chì, chì mi na còrrbheanna;
O, chì, chì mi na coireachan,
Chì mi na sgorran fo cheò.

Chì mi gun dàil an t-àite 'san d' rugadh mi;
Cuirear orm fàilte 'sa chànan a thuigeas mi;
Gheibh mi ann aoidh agus gràdh nuair ruigeam,
Nach reicinn air thunnachan òir.

Sèist

Chì mi ann coilltean; chì mi ann doireachan;
Chì mi ann maghan bàna is torraiche;
Chì mi na fèidh air làr nan coireachan,
Falaicht' an trusgan de cheò.

Sèist

Beanntaichean àrda is àillidh leacainnean;
Sluagh ann an còmhnaidh is còire chleachdainnean;
'S aotrom mo cheum a' leum 'gam faicinn;
Is fanaidh mi tacan le deòin.

Sèist

Fàilt' air na gorm-mheallaibh, tholmach, thulachnach;
Fàilt air na còrr-bheannaibh mòra, mulanach;
Fàilt' air na coilltean, is fàilt' air na h-uile -
O! 's sona bhith fuireach 'nan còir.

Sèist

Four more verses appeared in the Oban Times in 1882
written as follows:

Chì mi a' ghrian an liath nam flaitheanas,
Chì mi 's an iar a ciar 'n uair laigheas i;
Chan ionnan 's mar tha i ghnàth 's a' bhaile seo
'N deatach a' falach a glòir.

Gheibh mi ann ceòl bho eòin na Duthaige,
Ged a tha 'n t-àm thar am na cuthaige,
Tha smeòraichean ann is annsa guth leam
Na pìob, no fìdheall mar cheòl.

Gheibh mi le lìontan iasgach sgadain ann,
Gheibh mi le iarraidh bric is bradain ann;
Nam faighinn mo mhiann 's ann a stadainn,
'S ann ann as fhaid' bhithinn beò.

Fàgaidh mi ùpraid, surd, is glagaraich,
Dh'fhaicinn na tìr an cluinnt' a' chagaraich,
Fàgaidh mi cùirtean dùinte, salach,
A dh'amharc air gleannaibh nam bò.

=== Translation ===
Chorus:

O, I see, I see the big mountains;
O, I see, I see the steep mountains;
O, I see, I do see the corries,
I see the mist-covered peaks.

I see without delay the land of my birth;
I am welcomed in the language I understand.
I will receive there hospitality, and love when I reach it
That I'd trade not for tons of gold.

Chorus

I see there woods, and I see there thickets,
I see there the fair and most fertile of meadows;
I see there the deer on the ground in the corries
Hiding in mantles of mist.

Chorus

Lofty mountains and resplendent ledges,
There dwell my own folk, kind folk of honour.
Light is my step as I leap up to meet them;
'Tis with pleasure I'll stay there a while.

Chorus

Hail to the blue-green grassy hills;
Hail to the great peaked hummocky mountains;
Hail to the forests, hail to all there,
Content I would live there forever.

Chorus

== See also ==
- Ailein duinn
- Fear a' bhàta
- Gaelic music
- Smile In Your Sleep, Scottish folk song
