= Séamus Begley =

Irish musical artist (1949–2023)

Background information
- Born: Séamus Ó Beaglaoich; 26 September 1949; Baile na bPoc, Corca Dhuibhne, County Kerry, Ireland
- Died: 9 January 2023 (aged 73) Baile na bPoc, Corca Dhuibhne, County Kerry, Ireland
- Genre: Irish traditional music
- Instruments: Accordion, fiddle
- Years active: 1962–2023

Séamus Begley (Irish: Séamus Ó Beaglaoich, 26 August 1949 – 9 January 2023) was an Irish accordion player, and Irish traditional musician. He was regarded as one of Ireland's greatest accordion players.

== Early life ==
Seamus Begley grew up in County Kerry. He was born in Baile na bPoc on the Dingle Peninsula. One of a family of nine, his father, Breandán Ó Beaglaoich, owned the local dance hall and was a well-known accordionist.

== Career ==
Begley learned his music at home and began playing at the local céilí at the age of 13. He released his first album, An Ciarraíoch Mallaithe, with his sister Máire in 1973. Begley and his sister paired up again on Planxtaí Bhaile na bPoc in 1989, the same year he played at the Glastonbury Festival with Steve Cooney. He later collaborated with Cooney on the album Meitheal in 1992. Begley later partnered with the likes of Jim Murray, Mary Black, Sharon Shannon and Tim Edey, producing further albums.

== Death ==
Begley died on 9 January 2023, at the age of 73.

== See also ==
- List of Irish musicians
