= Holy Saturday =

Saturday before Easter Sunday

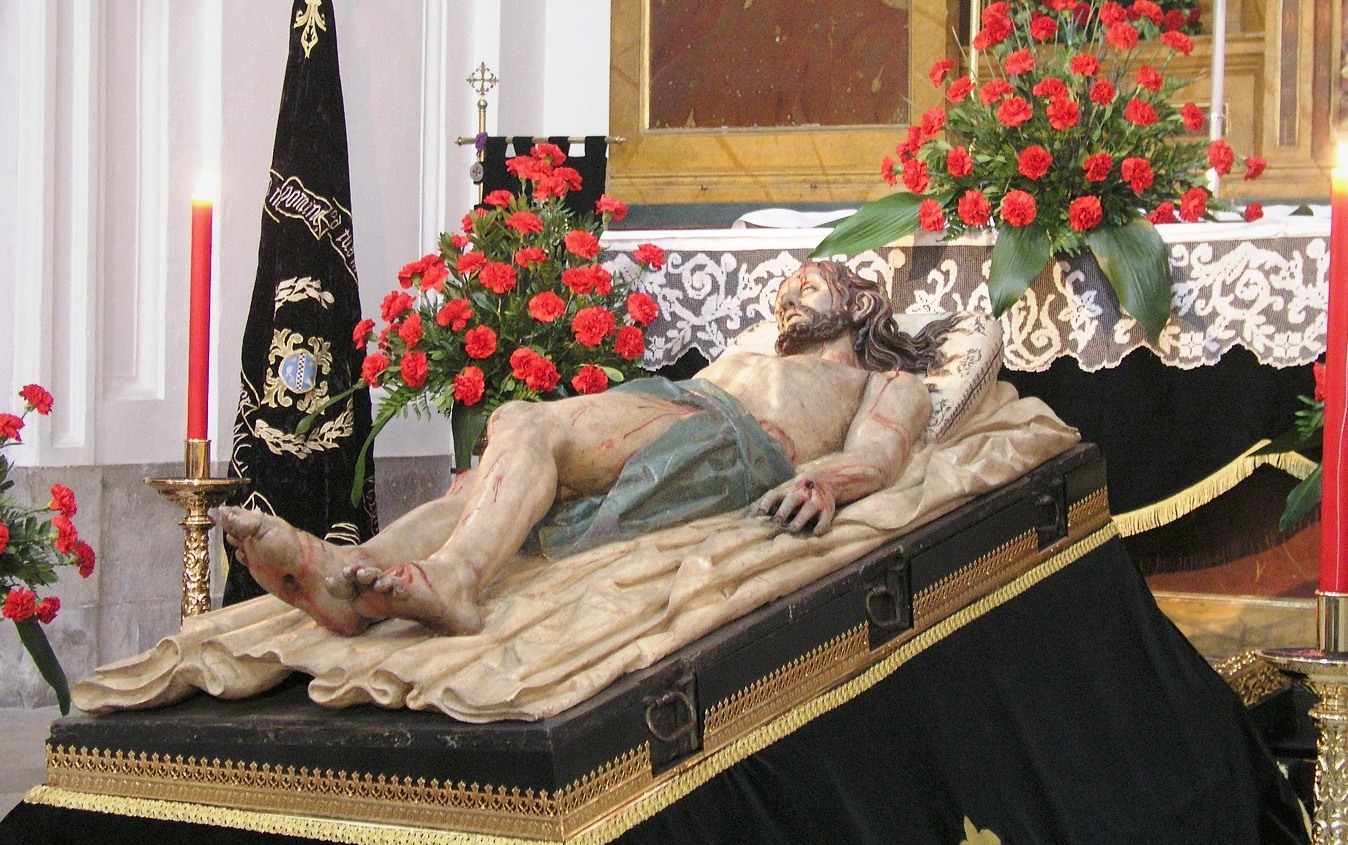
- Statue of Christ in the tomb by Gregorio Fernández. (Monastery of San Joaquín y Santa Ana, Valladolid)
- Official name: Holy Saturday
- Also called: Easter Eve, Black Saturday
- Observed by: Christians
- Type: Religious
- Significance: Memory of the day Jesus Christ's body lay in the tomb and the Harrowing of Hell
- Date: Day after Good Friday
- 2025 date: April 19 (Western); April 19 (Eastern)
- 2026 date: April 4 (Western); April 11 (Eastern)
- 2027 date: March 27 (Western); May 1 (Eastern)
- 2028 date: April 15 (Western); April 15 (Eastern)
- Frequency: Annual
- Related to: Easter

Holy Saturday (Latin: Sabbatum Sanctum) (Note: Also known as Great and Holy Saturday, Low Saturday, the Great Sabbath, Hallelujah Saturday, Saturday of the Glory, Easter Eve Joyous Saturday, the Saturday of Light, Good Saturday, or Black Saturday, among other names.) is the final day of Holy Week, between Good Friday and Easter Sunday, and when Christians prepare for the Christian feast of Easter.

The day commemorates the Harrowing of Hell while Jesus Christ's body lay in the tomb. Christians of the Catholic, Lutheran, and Anglican denominations begin the celebration of the Easter Vigil service on Holy Saturday, which provides a transition to the season of Eastertide; in the Moravian Christian tradition, graves are decorated with flowers during the day of Holy Saturday and the celebration of the sunrise service starts before dawn on Easter Sunday. Congregations of the Reformed and Methodist denominations may hold either the Easter Vigil or an Easter Sunday sunrise service.

== Terminology ==
=== Jewish Nazarenes ===
Whereas the Great Sabbath in Jewish liturgy occurs the sabbath before the Feast of Unleavened Bread, the sabbath in the midst of the feast is celebrated as a Special Shabbat § Shabbat Chol Hamoed Pesach. In Hebrews 4, Jewish Christians are admonished to make every effort to enter this sabbath and every sabbath in repentance, and Psalm 95 is excerpted by the author of Hebrews: "today if you hear his voice, do not harden your hearts." The entirety of Psalm 95 is read on Friday afternoon every week in synagogue prayers immediately before receiving the sabbath in rabbinic Judaism.

=== Eastern traditions ===
==== Eastern Orthodoxy ====
In Eastern Orthodoxy, Holy Saturday, known as Holy and Great Saturday, is also called The Great Sabbath since it is on this day that Christ "rested" physically in the tomb. It is also believed that it was on this day he performed, in spirit, the Harrowing of Hell, and was raised up to Paradise, having liberated those who had been held captive. Eastern Orthodox Christians in Palestine and the Levant call Holy Saturday sabt an-nūr (Arabic: سبت النور, lit. 'Saturday of Light'), and commemorate it by the Holy Fire ceremony at the Church of the Holy Sepulchre.

==== Oriental Orthodoxy ====
In the Coptic, Ethiopian and Eritrean Orthodox churches, Holy Saturday is known as Joyous Saturday, and otherwise known as the night of light and joy. It is known as the Saturday of Good Tidings or Gospel Saturday in the Syriac Orthodox Church, which is also a day where Syriac Christians remember their departed.

==== Syriac Christianity ====
In the Syriac Christian tradition, Holy Saturday is known as šábbṯā d-núhrā (Classical Syriac: ܫܲܒܬ݂ܵܐ ܕܢܘܼܗܪܵܐ), or the Saturday of Light.

=== Western traditions ===
In Western traditions, the day is usually called Holy Saturday, although in the Moravian Church, the day is referred to as the Great Sabbath and in the Anglican Communion, the Book of Common Prayer refers to the day as Easter Even.

Although the term Easter Saturday is usually applied to the Saturday in Easter week, in English-speaking countries it is sometimes erroneously applied to Holy Saturday, with the term even being present in legislation in the Australian states of New South Wales and Queensland, and by Australian government agencies. In the Catholic tradition, the Blessed Virgin Mary is honored on this day under the title Our Lady of Solitude, referring to her grief at the death of her son.

== Religious and cultural practices ==
=== Eastern traditions ===
==== Eastern Orthodox ====
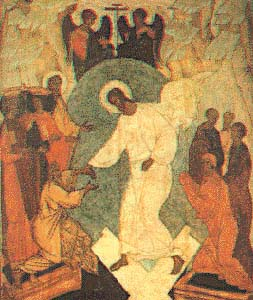
The icon of Holy and Great Saturday, portraying the Harrowing of Hades

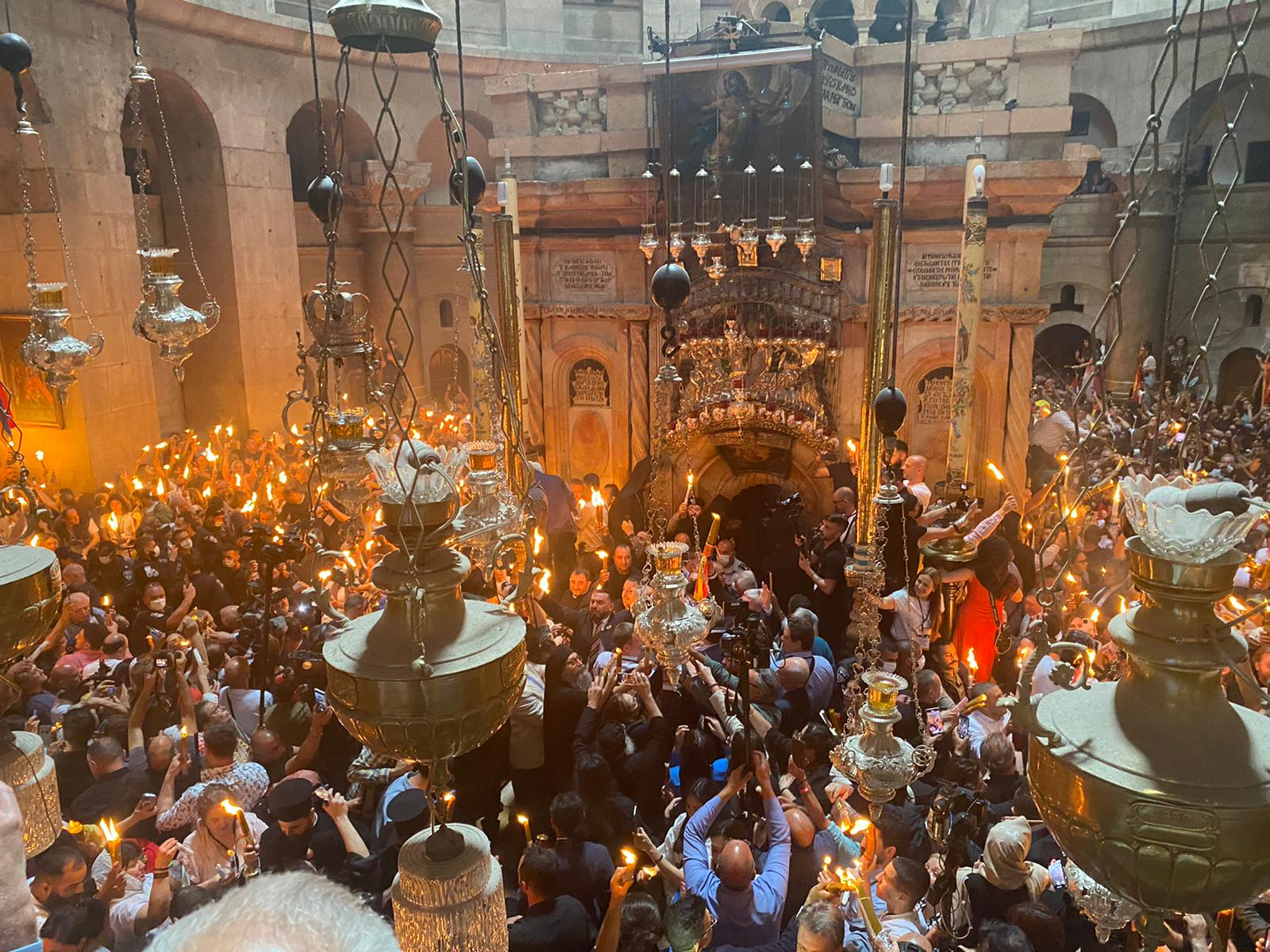
Holy Fire in 2022

Matins of Holy and Great Saturday (in parishes usually held on Friday evening) takes the form of a funeral service for Christ. The entire service takes place around the Epitaphios, an icon in the form of a cloth embroidered with the image of Christ prepared for burial. The first part of the service consists of chanting Psalm 118, as usual at both Saturday matins and at funerals, but interspersed with hymns (enkomia or 'lamentations') between the verses. The predominant theme of the service is not so much one of mourning, but of watchful expectation:

Today Thou dost keep holy the seventh day,
Which Thou has blessed of old by resting from Thy works.
Thou bringest all things into being and Thou makest all things new,
Observing the Sabbath rest, my Saviour, and restoring strength.

— Canon of Holy and Great Saturday, Ode 4

Near the end of matins, at the end of the Great Doxology, the Epitaphios is taken up and carried in procession around the outside of the church, while the Trisagion is sung, as is done when carrying the body to the cemetery in an Orthodox burial.

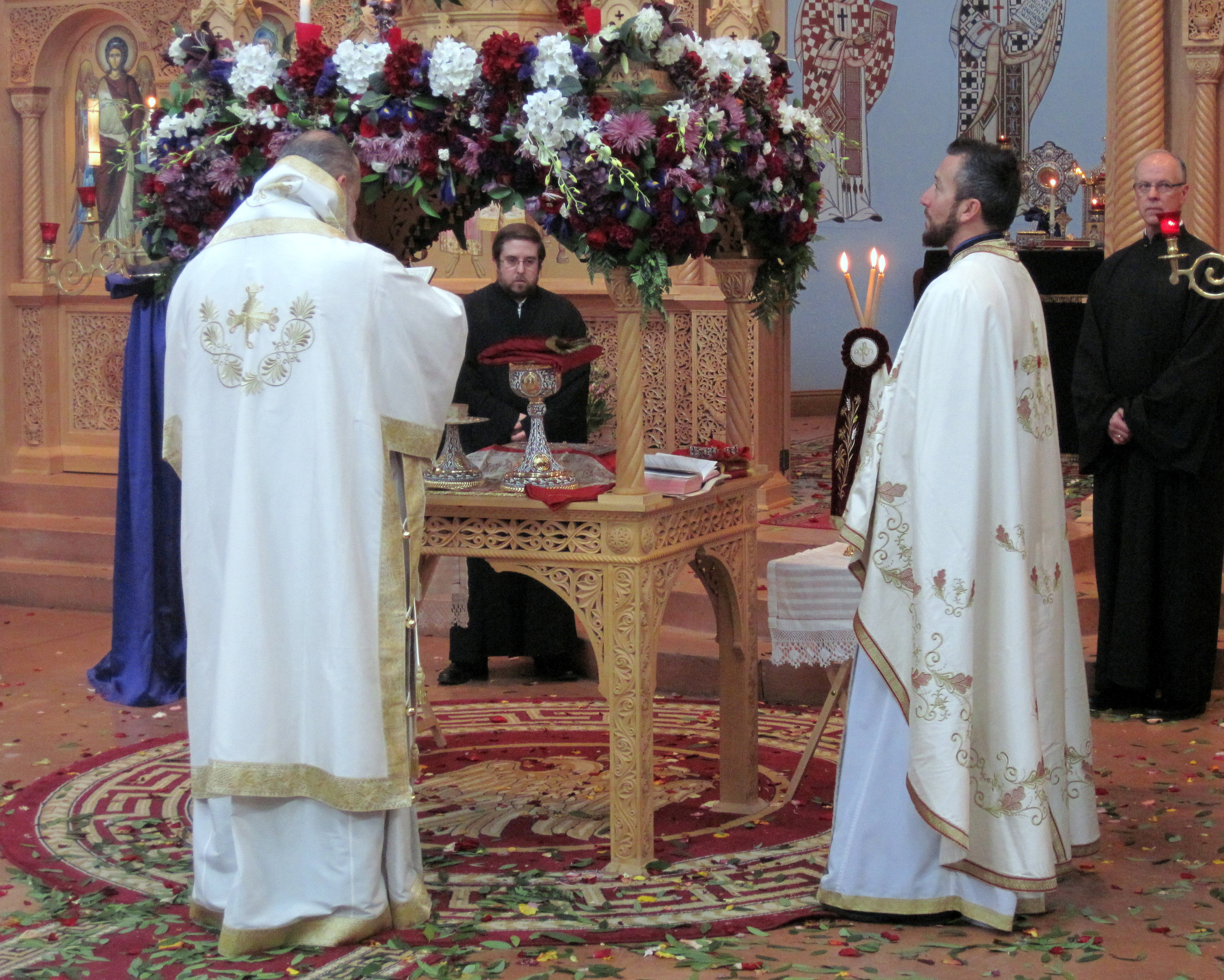
Divine Liturgy of Holy Saturday in a Greek Orthodox church in the United States

On Saturday, a vesperal Divine Liturgy of Saint Basil the Great is celebrated, called the First Resurrection Service (Greek: Ἡ Πρώτη Ἀνάστασις), named so because chronologically it was composed earlier than the Paschal Canon by John of Damascus rather than because it occurs earlier liturgically. This is the longest Divine Liturgy of the entire year and is performed later than on any other day of the year, "at the tenth hour of the day".

On 'Lord, I call', four of the usual Sunday hymns from the Octoechos are sung, followed by four for the day, the doxasticon from Lauds the night before and the usual dogmatikon. After the Little Entrance, there is no Evening Prokimenon, but there are 15 Old Testament readings that recall the history of salvation, many of which relate to Passover, baptism, or the Resurrection (note that book names here are given according to the Septuagint):

- Genesis 1:1–13 – God creates the universe
- Isaiah 60:1–16 – Isaiah prophecies a golden age for Judah
- Exodus 12:1–11 – God gives instructions for the first Passover
- Jonah 1:1–4:11 – Jonah spends three days in the belly of a sea monster
- Joshua 5:10–15 – Joshua celebrates Passover
- Exodus 13:20·15:19 – The Israelites cross the Red Sea; the final 19 verses are sung as a canticle
- Zephaniah 3:8–15 – God promises refuge to Israel
- 3 Kings 17:8–24 – Elijah meets the widow of Zarephath and resurrects her son
- Isaiah 61:10–62:5 – Isaiah celebrates a coming salvation
- Genesis 22:1–18 – God tests Abraham by telling him to sacrifice his son Isaac
- Isaiah 61:1–9 – Isaiah explains the role of a prophet and the relationship Israel will have with God
- 4 Kings 4:8–37 – Elisha resurrects the son of the Shunamite woman
- Isaiah 63:11–64:5 – Isaiah remembers the crossing of the Red Sea and prays for his people
- Jeremiah 31:31–34 – Jeremiah prophecies the new covenant
- Daniel 3:1–89 – The Three Holy Youths are cast into a fiery furnace; the final 33 verses (and three extra-biblical ones) are sung as a canticle.

In place of the Trisagion, the baptismal hymn "As many as have been baptised into Christ have put on Christ. Alleluia." is sung. The Prokimenon is from Psalm 65 (66), made up of verses from the First Antiphon of Pascha: "Let all the earth worship Thee: sing of Thee and praise Thy Name, O most High." The Epistle is Romans 6:3-11, Paul's explanation of the role of death and resurrection in baptism. This is the standard epistle read at baptisms.

Unique to this day, the Alleluia is replaced with Psalm 81 (82) being sung: "Arise, O God, judge Thou the earth: for Thou shalt have an inheritance in all the nations" while the deacon performs a censing of the church. In Slavic tradition where the service is begun in dark vestments, the hangings, altar cloths, curtain and vestments are changed to bright. In Greek and Arabic tradition, the clergy strew laurel leaves (a symbol of victory) and flower petals all over the church to symbolize Jesus' triumph over death, often accompanied – especially in Cypriot custom – by the congregation making a loud noise by stamping their feet, banging on pews and sticks, and even clanging pots and pans, all to symbolize Christ shattering the gates and breaking the chains of hell.

The liturgical atmosphere changes from sorrow to joy at this service. The faithful continue to fast and the Paschal greeting, "Christ is risen!", is not exchanged until after midnight during the Paschal Vigil since this service represents the proclamation of Jesus' victory over death to those in Hades. The Resurrection has not yet been announced to those on earth, which takes place during the Paschal Vigil.

The Gospel reading is Matthew 28:1-20, the Gospel of Matthew's account of the Resurrection. While the first fifteen verses are not read at any other time, the final five verses form one of the Sunday Matins Gospels and are the standard Gospel reading for baptisms.

The Cherubic Hymn is replaced by 'Let all mortal flesh keep silence', an analogous hymn from the ancient Liturgy of Saint James, and the Hymn to the Theotokos is replaced with the irmos from Ode 9 of the Canon the night before, Christ's promise to his mother that she will be magnified following his Resurrection, but other than that the Liturgy proceeds as any other Liturgy of St. Basil. After the service, in many places, it is customary to break and bless bread as at a Vigil, but to omit the blessing of oil.

Great Lent was originally the period of catechesis for new converts in order to prepare them for baptism and chrismation and when there are converts received, that occurs during the Old testament readings during the vesperal divine liturgy. Before the midnight service, the faithful gather in church for the reading of the Acts of the Apostles in its entirety. Preceding midnight the Paschal Vigil begins with the Midnight Office, during which the Canon of Holy Saturday is repeated, toward the end of which the epitaphios is removed from the center of the church and placed on the altar table where it remains until the Ascension. (Note: In Greek practice, this was done at Matins the night before (i.e. Matins of Holy Saturday).) Then, all of the candles and lights in the church are extinguished, and all wait in darkness and silence for the proclamation of the Resurrection of Christ.

=== Western traditions ===
Holy Saturday and other named days and day ranges around Lent and Easter in Western Christianity, with the fasting days of Lent numbered

==== Roman Catholicism ====
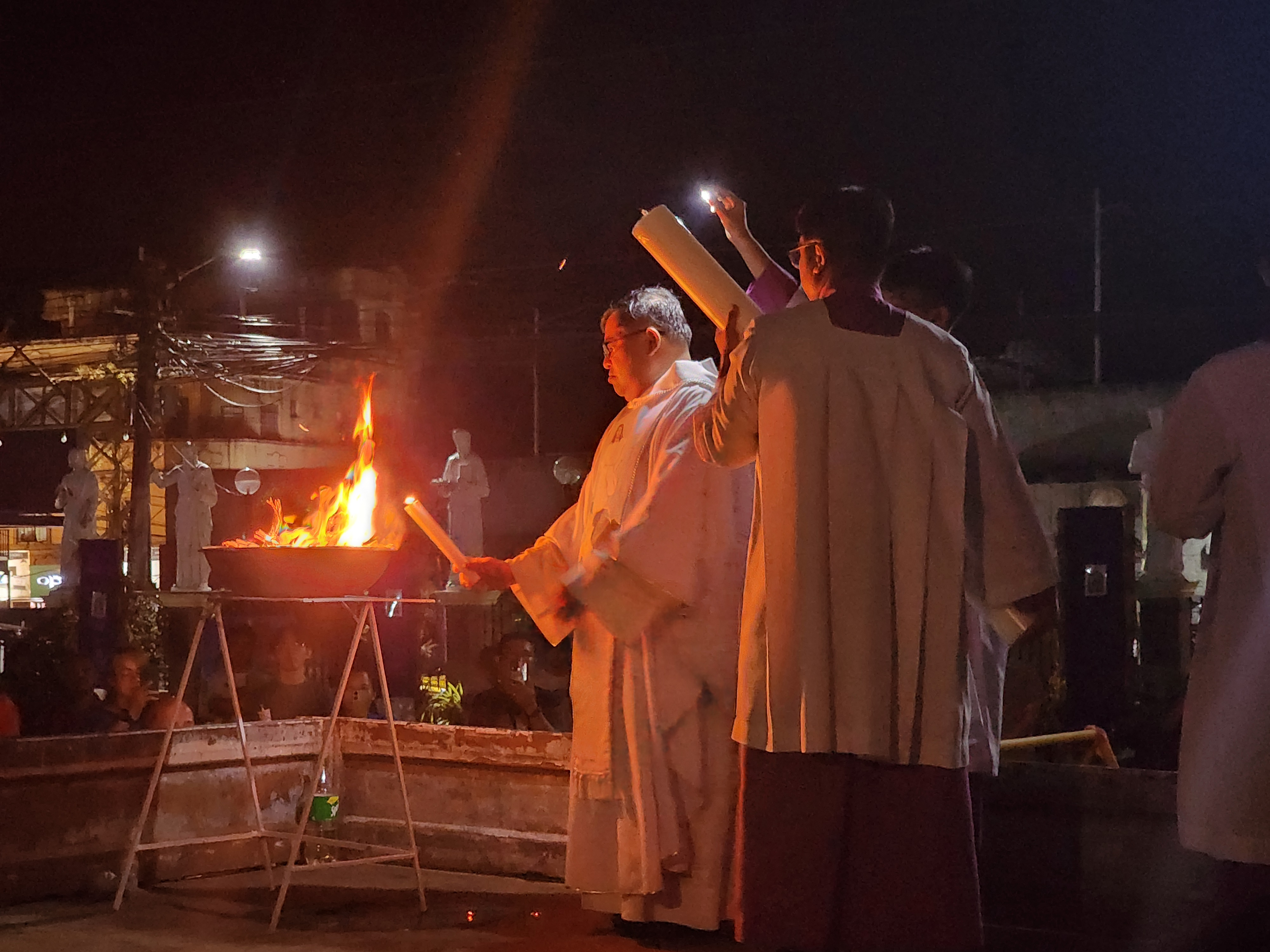
Lighting of the Paschal Candle from the Easter fire symbolises Christ's triumph over darkness, Philippines

In the Catholic Church, the altar remains stripped completely bare (following the Mass of the Lord's Supper on Maundy Thursday). The celebration of the Sacraments is extremely limited: Holy Communion is given only as Viaticum to the dying; while penance, Anointing of the Sick and baptism may be administered because they, like Viaticum, are helpful to ensuring salvation for the dying. The day is the second day of the Paschal fast as outlined in Sacrosanctum Concilium, Article 110. In the Roman Catholic Church, plenary indulgence is obtained if two or more faithfuls pray the Holy Rosary or if the faithful attend the celebration of the Easter Vigil and renew their baptismal promises, which are part of the liturgy of the same Mass.

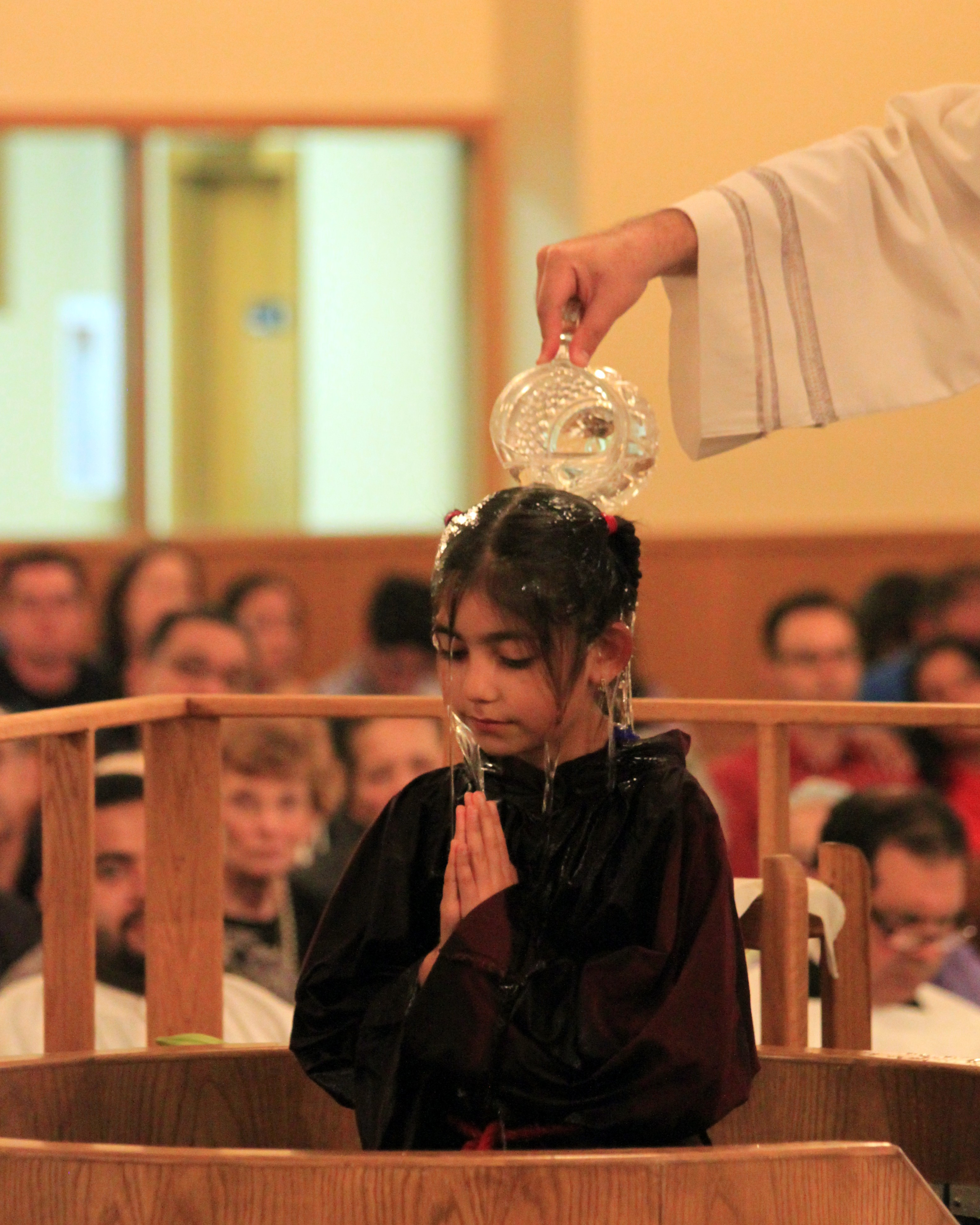
Catholics typically perform the sacrament of Baptism on Holy Saturday Mass.

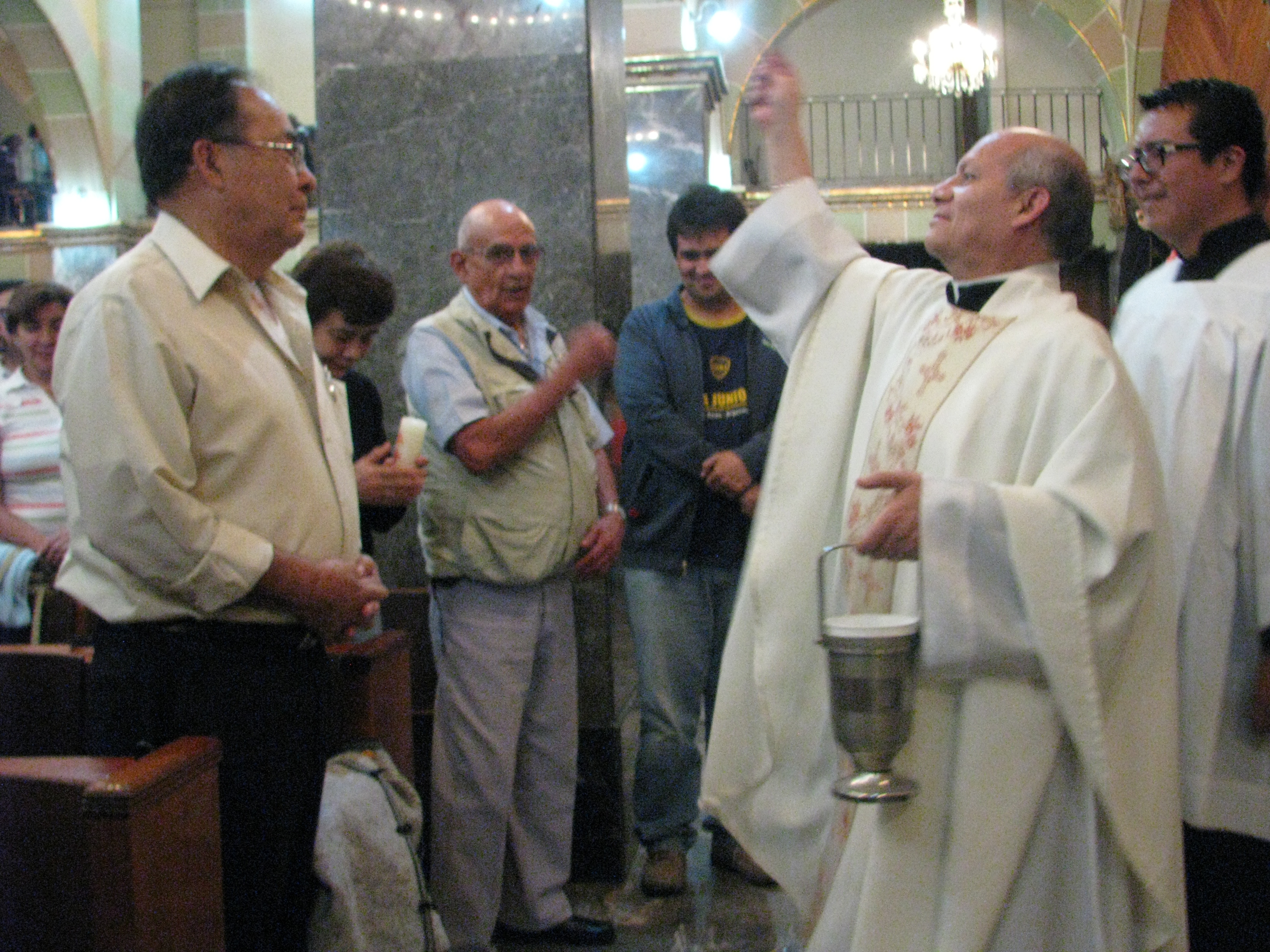
Sprinkling of holy water following the renewal of baptismal vows

In the predominantly Catholic Philippines, the day is legally and colloquially known as Black Saturday, given the colour's role in mourning. It commemorates the day that Jesus lay in his tomb. Traditional taboos from the previous day are carried over and are sometimes broken; swimming is allowed in the afternoon. Most commercial establishments resume operations, with smaller enterprises remaining closed until or before Easter. Television and radio stations broadcast on shorter hours with special programming or remain off-air.

In predominantly Catholic Poland, Święconka (Polish pronunciation: [ɕvʲɛnˈtsɔnka]), meaning 'the blessing of the Easter baskets', on Holy Saturday, is one of the enduring traditions. Baskets containing eggs, ham, bread, sweet breads, horseradish, and lamb cakes or butter lambs are brought to church to be blessed.

In Slovakia and the Czech Republic, the day is called Biela sobota or Bílá sobota, meaning 'White Saturday', named after the white robes of those baptized during the Mass.

==== Protestantism ====
Lutheran, Anglican, Methodist, and other churches observe many of the same customs as the Catholic Church; however, their altars may be covered in black instead of being stripped. The Anglican Book of Common Prayer uses Easter Even to designate the day. In some Anglican churches, including the Protestant Episcopal Church in the United States of America, provision is made for a simple Liturgy of the Word on this day, with readings commemorating the burial of Christ. Daily Offices are still observed. In the Moravian Church, the day is known as Great Sabbath.

In the Catholic, Lutheran, Anglican and Methodist traditions, Holy Saturday lasts until nightfall, after which the Easter Vigil is celebrated, marking the official start of the Easter season.

In the Moravian Church, people decorate the graves in God's Acre with flowers; the sunrise service, the first liturgy of Paschaltide, begins before dawn of Easter Sunday.

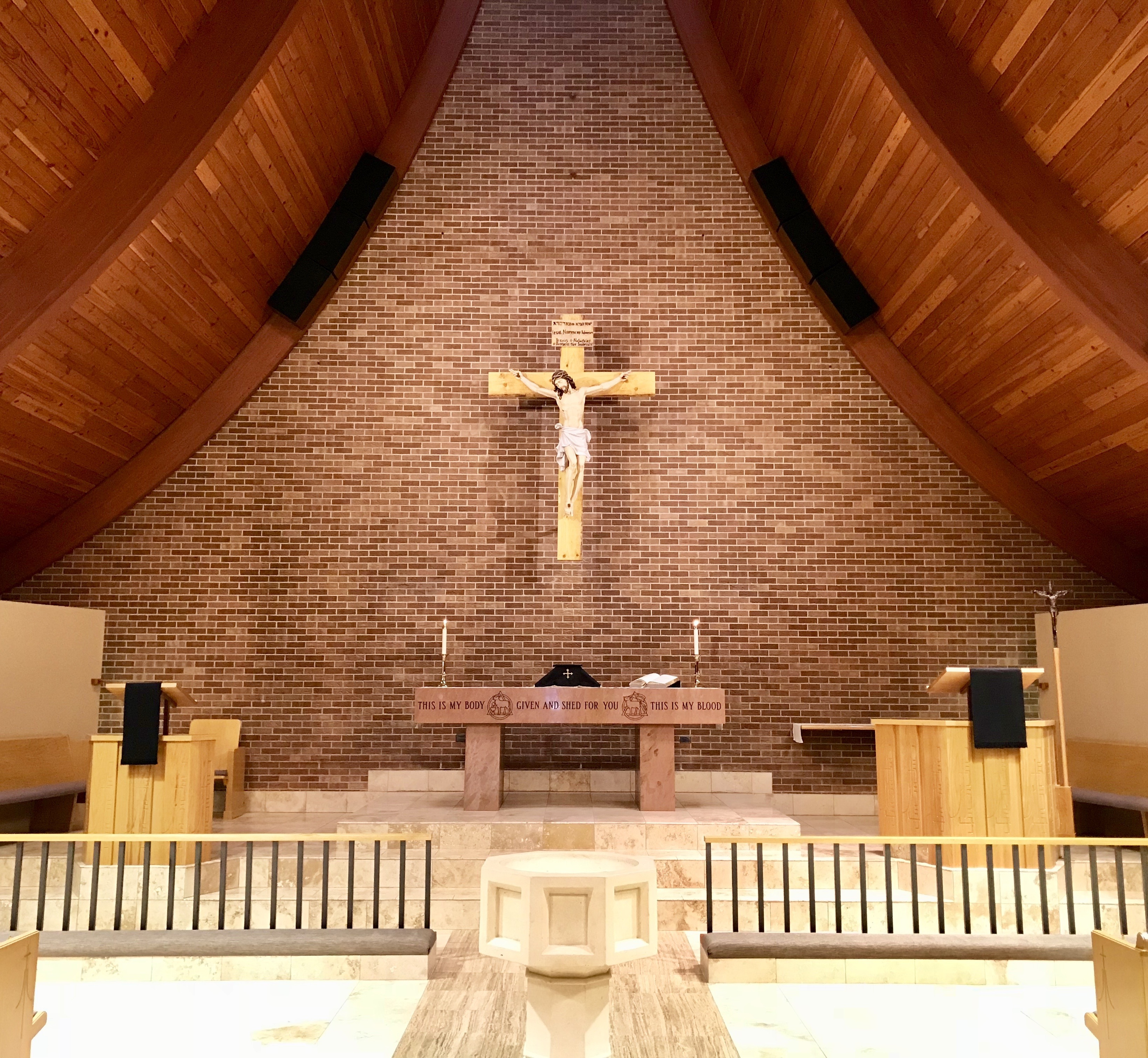
The chancel of a Lutheran church on Holy Saturday is adorned with black paraments, as black is the liturgical colour of this day in the Lutheran churches.

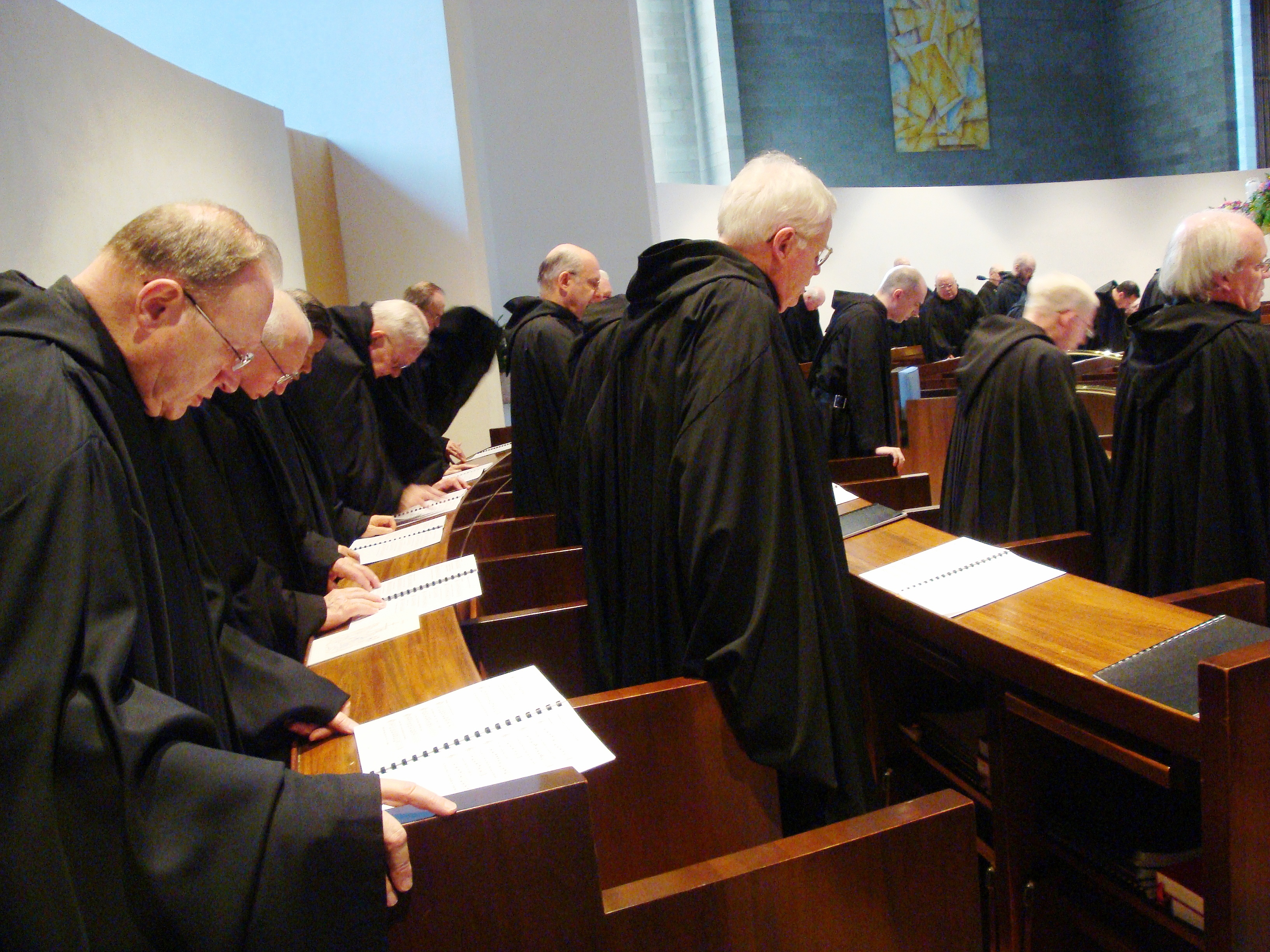
Benedictine monks singing Vespers on Holy Saturday

== Sources ==
- Parry, Ken; David Melling, eds. (1999). The Blackwell Dictionary of Eastern Christianity. Malden, MA.: Blackwell Publishing. ISBN 0-631-23203-6. OCLC 156905118.
