= Gaelic music =

Music written in the Gaelic languages

Gaelic music (Irish: Ceol Gaelach, "Irish music" or "Gaelic music," Scottish Gaelic: Ceòl Gàidhealach) is an umbrella term for any music written in the Gaelic languages of Irish and Scottish Gaelic. To differentiate between the two, the Irish language is typically just referred to as "Irish", or sometimes as "Gaeilge" (pronounced "gehl-guh"); Scottish Gaelic is referred to as "Gàidhlig" (commonly pronounced as "GAH-lick"). Gaelic music is also classified under "Celtic music".

Gaelic music is distinguished from Anglophone musical forms in a number of ways. For example, longer narratives such as murder ballads, and songs chronicling the many woes of the singer's life which were very common in England and lowland Scotland, and later in America, were seldom seen in Gaelic. Themes frequently found in Gaelic music include the great beauty and spiritual qualities of nature ("Chi Mi Na Mòrbheanna," "An Ataireachd Ard"), and laments for lost loved ones ("Fear a' Bhàta," "Ailein Duinn," "Griogal Cridhe"). Laments are nearly always sung from the female perspective, expressing deep grief if the male lover is dead or begging him to return if he is absent or missing. Another prominent theme is unrequited love, separated lovers, or songs from the point of view of an admirer, usually a male ("Bruach na Carraige Báine", "Moll Dubh a'Ghleanna," "Bheadh Buachaillín deas ag Síle").

In Scotland, long complex piobaireachd, or pibroch, compositions (originally on the Celtic harp, but then transposed to pipes or fiddle as these instruments came into vogue in the Highlands, in the 16th and 17th centuries), are also characteristic of Gaelic music, as is the highly ornamented style of sean-nós singing ("old-style singing") in Ireland. Other subgenres include puirt à beul (mouth-music) and waulking songs. In the Western Isles of Scotland, distinctive Gaelic psalm singing can be found in Presbyterian churches, though this is simply the Gaelic adaptation of an older English tradition that has become rare in the English-speaking world. This is one of the relatively few traditions that managed to spread from England to Gaelic-speaking areas, have otherwise tended to maintain their musical independence.

Dance music, such as reels, hornpipes and jigs, usually played on the fiddle (although other instruments have been introduced, such as accordion and tin whistle), were also common; for example, the strathspey, which likely developed in the Scottish region of the same name. These were usually considered to be "lower" forms of music in the Gaelic world, and as such, were often referred to as "ceol beag" ("little music") to distinguish them from the more elevated pibroch style ("ceol mór," or "great music").

Scottish Gaelic music could be found in pockets of the Cape Fear Valley, in North Carolina, until just after the Civil War. In Nova Scotia, particularly Cape Breton Island, many Scottish Highlanders arrived in the late eighteenth and nineteenth centuries, and there remains a thriving Gaelic music community. The northern side of the island is somewhat more Irish in its lineages and musical influences, and often referred to as "The Northside". Irish Gaelic music can also be found in Newfoundland.

Genres such as rap and metalcore are now found in Gaelic too; from artists such as Hammy Sgìth, Kneecap (band), and Gun Ghaol.

== Famous Gaelic songs ==
Gaelic song

- Amhrán na bhFiann ("The Soldier's Song")
- Óró Sé do Bheatha 'Bhaile ("Oh, Welcome Home")
- Ailein Duinn ("Dark-haired Alan")
- Chì mi na mòrbheanna ("I See the Great Mountains," also known in English as "The Mist-Covered Mountains of Home")
- Fear a' Bhàta ("The Boatman")
- An Ciarraioch Mallaithe ("The Cursed Kerryman")
