= Epitaphios (liturgical) =

Liturgical cloth depicting the dead body of Christ

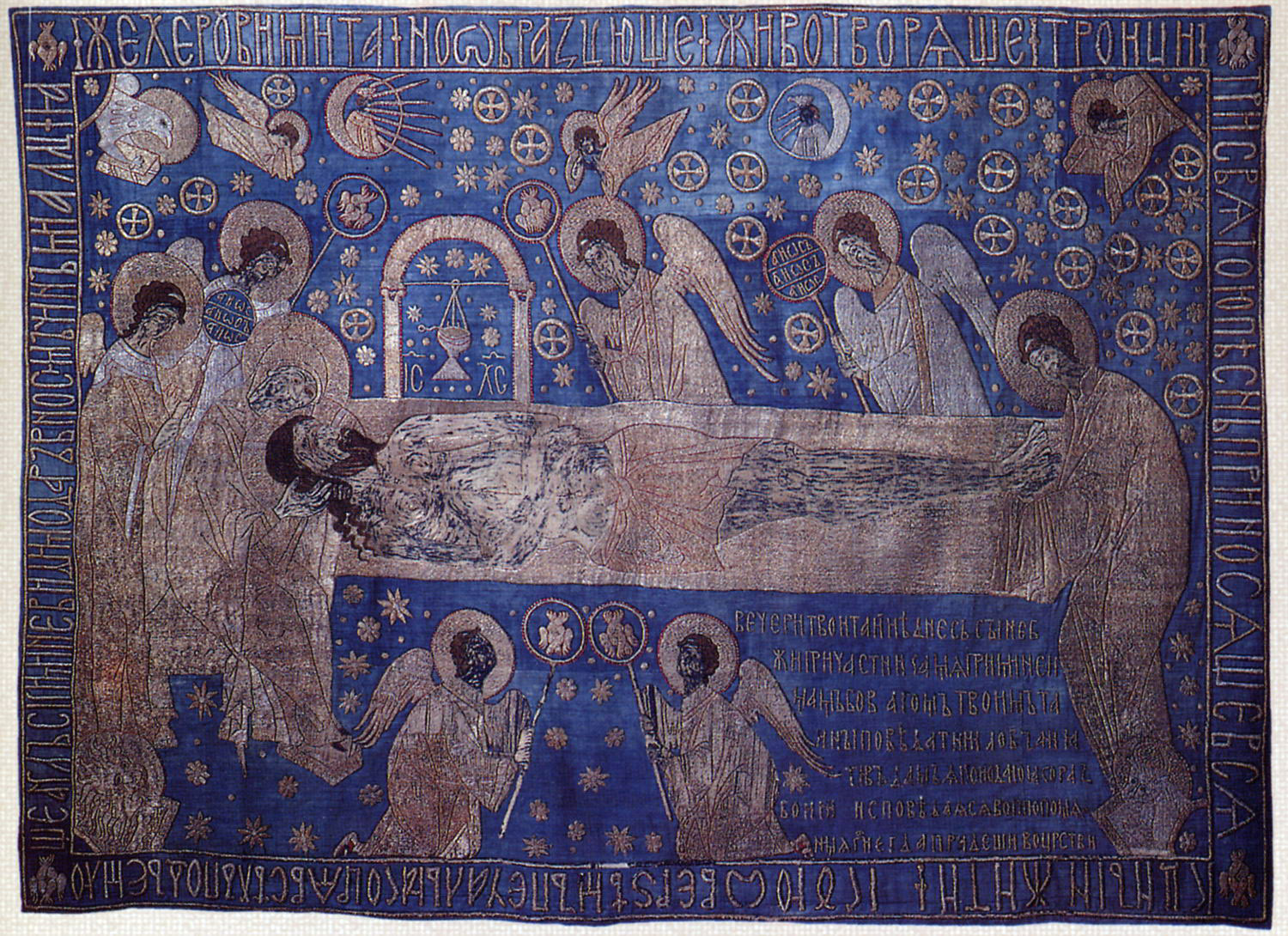
Epitaphios, Early 15th century, at Trinity Lavra of St. Sergius

The Epitaphios (Greek: Ἐπιτάφιος, epitáphios, or Ἐπιτάφιον, epitáphion, meaning "upon the tomb"; Slavonic: Плащаница, plashchanitsa; Arabic: نعش, naash) is a Christian religious icon, typically consisting of a large, embroidered and often richly adorned cloth, bearing an image of the dead body of Christ, often accompanied by his mother and other figures, following the Gospel account. It is used during the liturgical services of Holy Saturday in the Eastern Orthodox and Byzantine Catholic churches.

The Epitaphios is also a common short form of the Epitáphios Thrēnos, the "Lamentation upon the Grave" in Greek, which is a major part of the service of the Matins of Holy Saturday (now typically performed the evening of Good Friday).

Some Oriental Orthodox Churches (such as the Armenian Orthodox) also have the tradition of the epitaphios and their celebration on this day is called T'aghman Kark ("Rite of the Burial" in Armenian).

== Etymology ==
The word Epitáphios is composite, from the Greek ἐπί, epí, "on" or "upon", and τάφος, táphos, "grave" or "tomb". In Greek the word has, inter alia, the meaning of both the English epitaph and the liturgical one presented here, the latter having been acquired during the Christian period.

== Iconography ==
The icon depicts Christ after he has been removed from the cross, lying supine, as his body is being prepared for burial. The scene is taken from the Gospel of John. Shown around him, and mourning his death, may be his mother; John the beloved disciple; Joseph of Arimathea; and Mary Magdalene, as well as angels. Nicodemus and others may also be depicted. Often the Four Evangelists will be shown in the corners. Sometimes, the body of Christ appears alone, except for angels, as if lying in state. The oldest surviving embroidered icon, of about 1200 (Venice) is in this form. The equivalent subjects in the West are called the "Anointing of Christ's body", or Lamentation of Christ (with a group present), or the Pietà, with just Christ held by Mary.

The image may be embroidered or painted on fabric or some other substrate, which is then mounted in a wide cloth border (burgundy is the most common colour) often edged in gold fringe. Some cloths are missing the corners of the border, to allow them to sit neatly on the holy table. Usually, the troparion of Holy Saturday is embroidered in gold letters around the edges of the icon:

Noble Joseph, taking down Thy most pure Body from the Tree, and having wrapped It in clean linen and covered It with spices, laid It in a new tomb..

In the Late Byzantine period, the icon depicting the burial of Jesus was commonly painted below a Christ Pantocrator in the apse of the prothesis (the chapel where the Liturgy of Preparation was performed) in Orthodox churches, illustrating a liturgical hymn which celebrated Christ "On the throne above and in the tomb below". The icon, in particular a panel mosaic version taken to Rome, probably in the 12th century, developed in the West into the subject Man of Sorrows, which was enormously popular in the Late Middle Ages, though that image shows a living Christ, normally with eyes open.

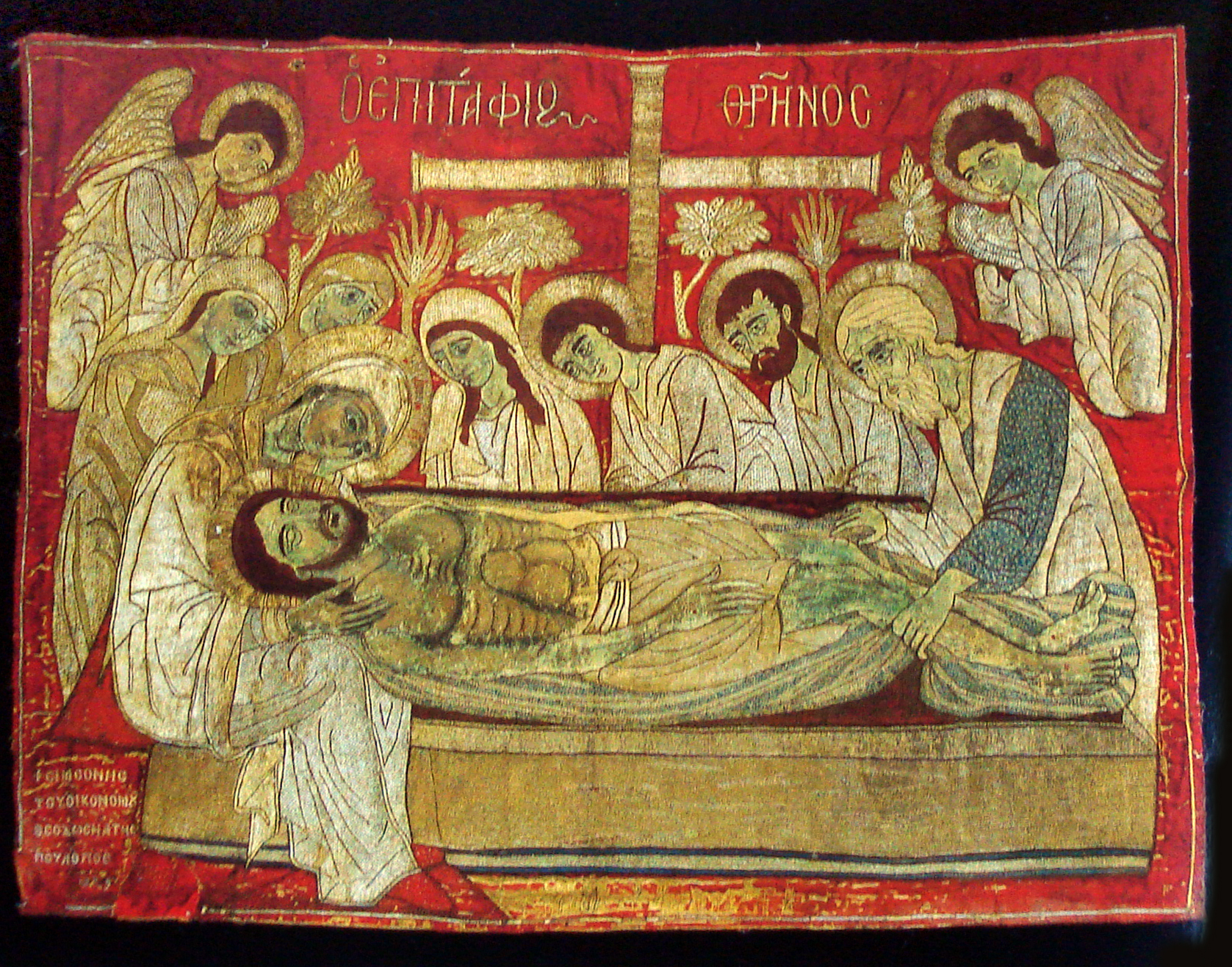
1599, Benaki Museum

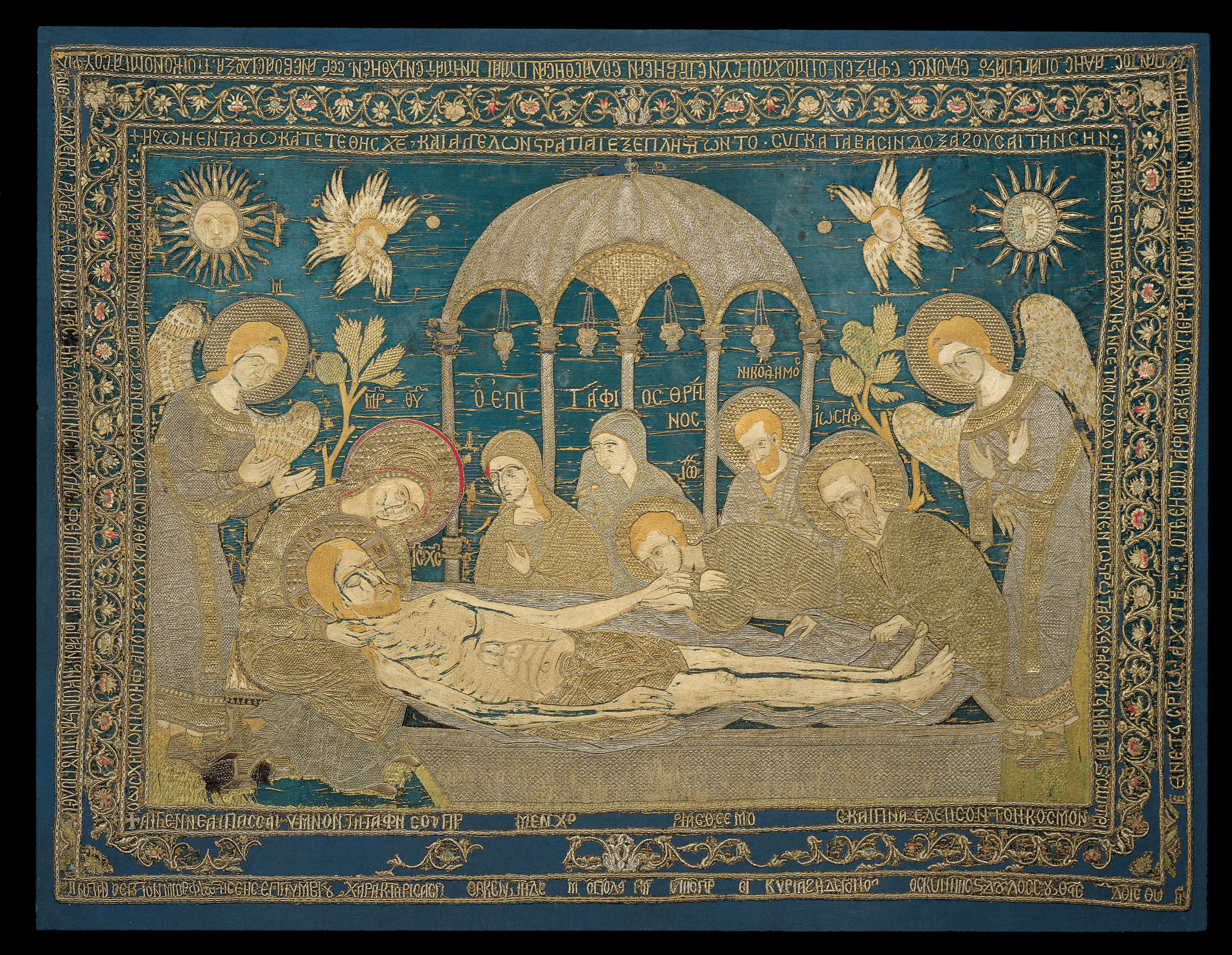
Ankara, 17th century, Benaki Museum)

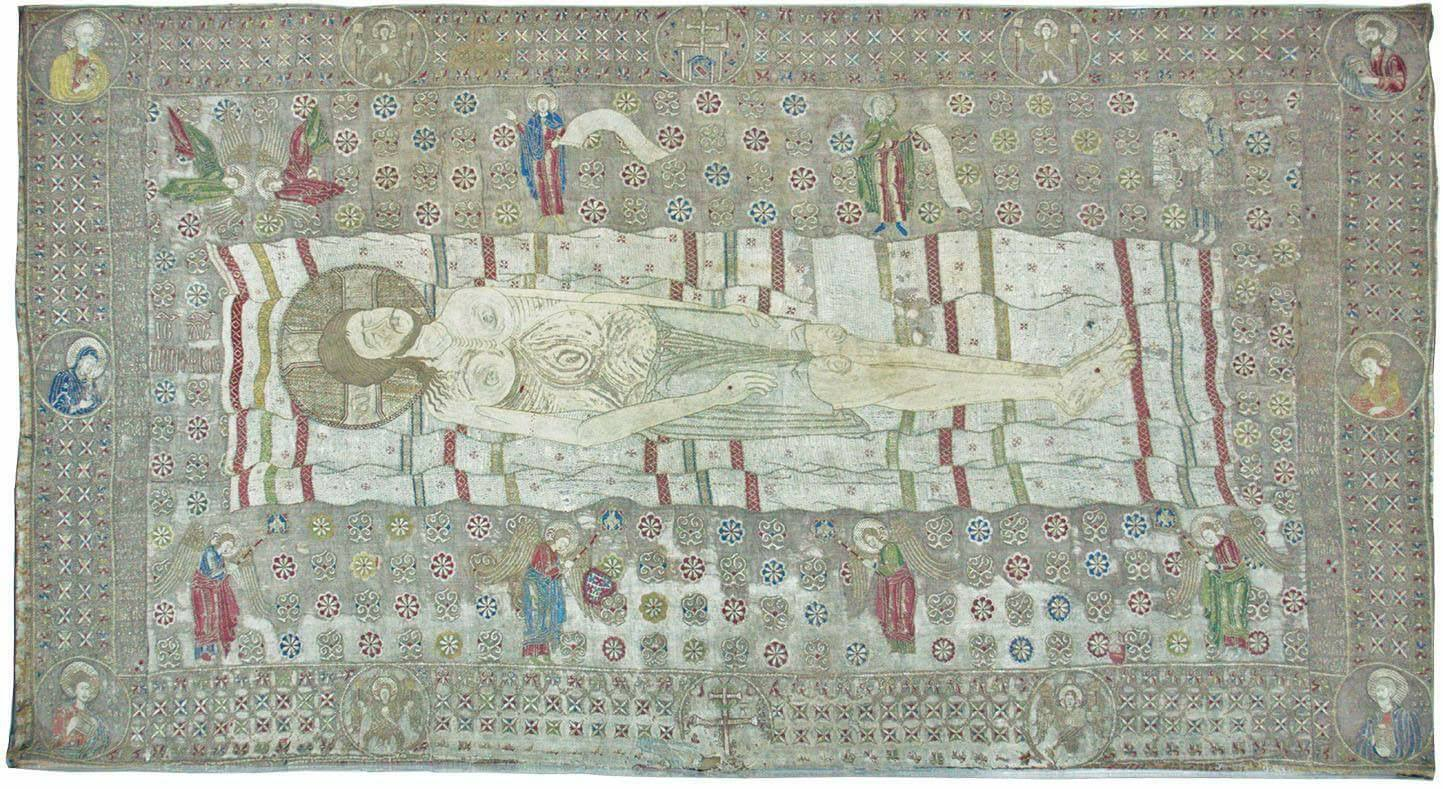
Epitaph of Gllavenica commissioned by Gjergj Arianiti, 1373

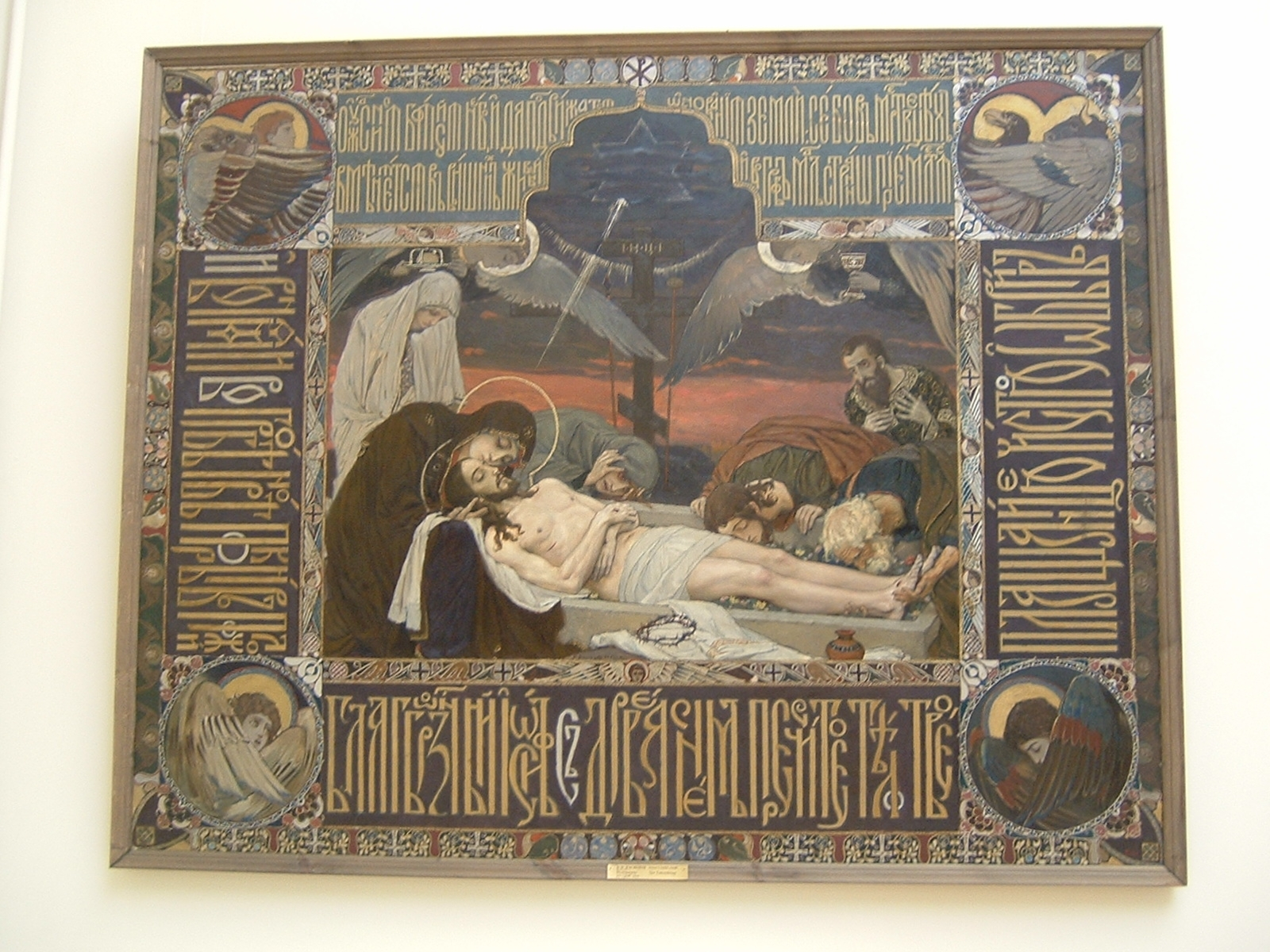
Viktor Vasnetsov, 1896

== Liturgical use ==
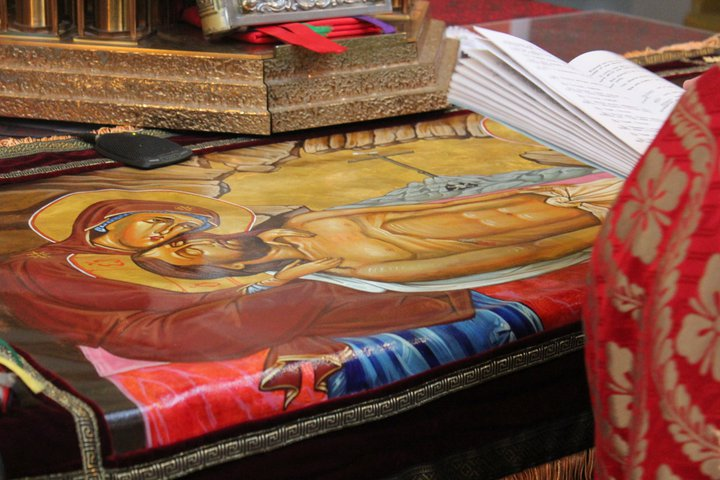
An Epitaphios placed on the Holy Table.

The Epitaphios is used on the last two days of Holy Week in the Byzantine rite, as part of the ceremonies marking the death and resurrection of Christ. It is then placed on the Holy Table (altar table), where it remains throughout the Paschal season.

=== Vespers on Great Friday ===
The Deposition from the Cross. Prior to the Apokathelosis, Vespers on the afternoon of Great Friday, the priest and deacon will place the Epitaphios on the Holy Table. The priest may also anoint the Epitaphios with perfumed oil. A chalice veil and the Gospel Book is placed on top of the Epitaphios. This may be either the large Gospel Book that otherwise lies on the Holy table, or it may be a small one.

During the reading of the Gospel lesson (a concatenation compiled from selections of all four Gospels) which recounts the death and burial of Christ, an icon depicting the soma (corpus) of Christ is taken down from a cross which has been set up in the middle of the church. The soma is wrapped in a white cloth and taken into the sanctuary.

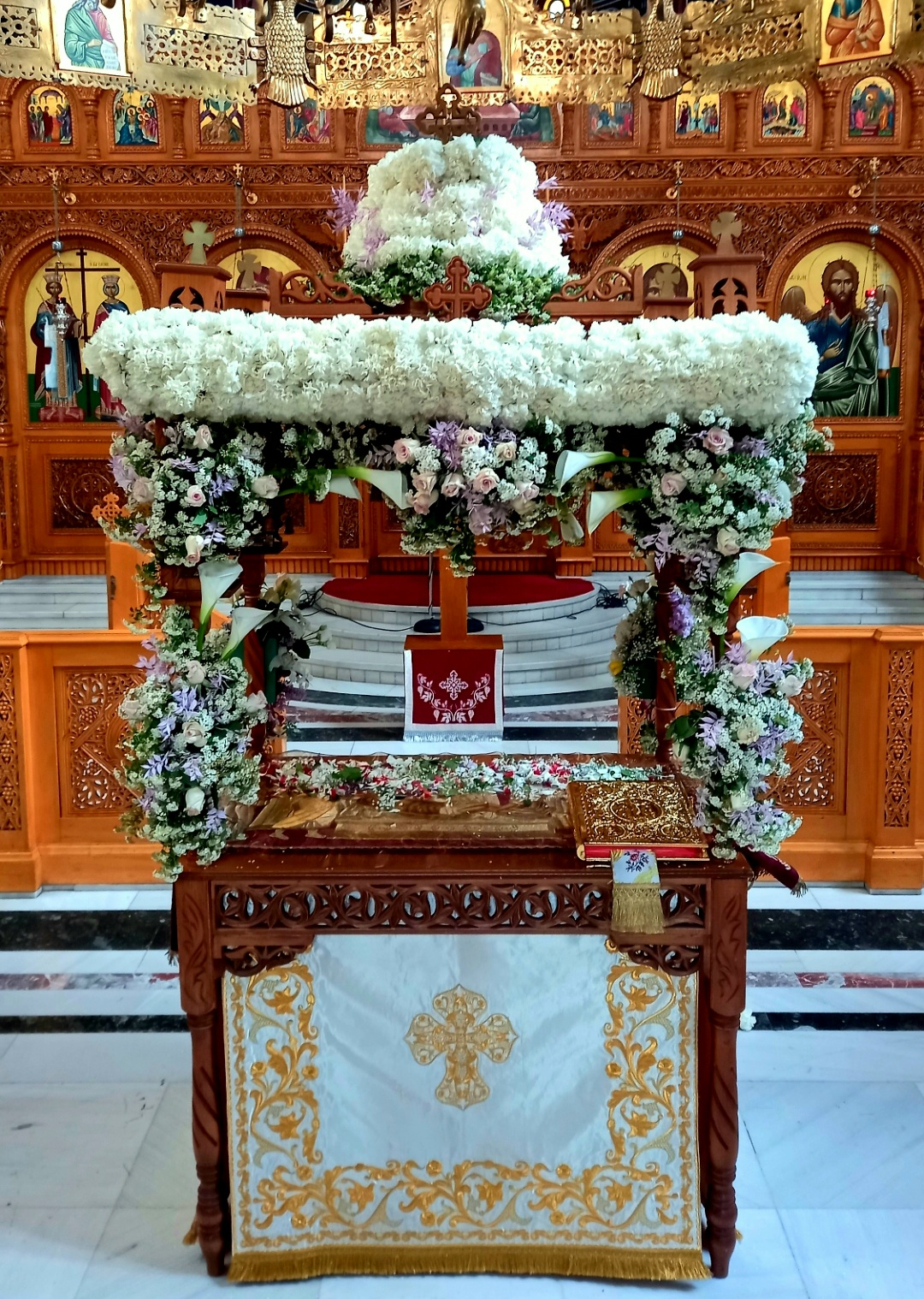
Epitaphios adorned for veneration.

Near the end of the service, the priest and deacon, accompanied by acolytes with candles and incense, bring the Epitaphios in procession from the Holy Table into the center of the church and place it on a table which is often richly decorated for that purpose. The Gospel Book is laid on top of the epitaphios. In some Greek churches, an elaborately carved canopy, called a kouvouklion, stands over the Epitaphios. This bier or catafalque represents the Tomb of Christ, and is made of wood, usually elaborately carved. On Good Friday morning, the bier is decorated with spring flowers, mostly white, red, and purple, until it is covered by the flowers in its entirety. The Tomb is often sprinkled with flower petals and rosewater, decorated with candles, and ceremonially censed as a mark of respect. The bells of the church are tolled, and in traditionally Orthodox countries, flags are lowered to half-mast. Then the priest and faithful venerate the Epitaphios as the choir chants hymns. In Slavic churches, the service of Compline will be served next, during which a special Canon will be chanted which recalls the lamentations of the Theotokos.

The faithful continue to visit the tomb and venerate the Epitaphios throughout the afternoon and evening, until Matins—which is usually served in the evening during Holy Week, so that the largest number of people can attend. The form which the veneration of the epitaphios takes will vary between ethnic traditions. Some will make three prostrations, then kiss the image of Christ on the Epitaphios and the Gospel Book, and then make three more prostrations. Sometimes, the faithful will crawl under the table on which the Epitaphios has been placed, as though entering into death with Christ. Others may simply light a candle and/or say a short prayer with bowed head. In Ukrainian Catholic churches and others of the Ruthenian tradition, the laity will often sing vernacular hymns at this point. One such hymn is stradal'na maty (страдальна мати), the contents of which approximate the Stabat Mater, and may be heard here:

The priest may hear confessions at the Epitaphios, and he may anoint people who were not able to be present for the Unction service earlier in the week. The Acolouthia of the Holy and Great Saturday and hence the Epitaphios procession (see below), started according to ancient customs during the Saturday Matins (Orthros), but nowadays, it frequently begins a bit earlier, at the night of Holy and Great Friday.

=== Matins on Great Saturday ===
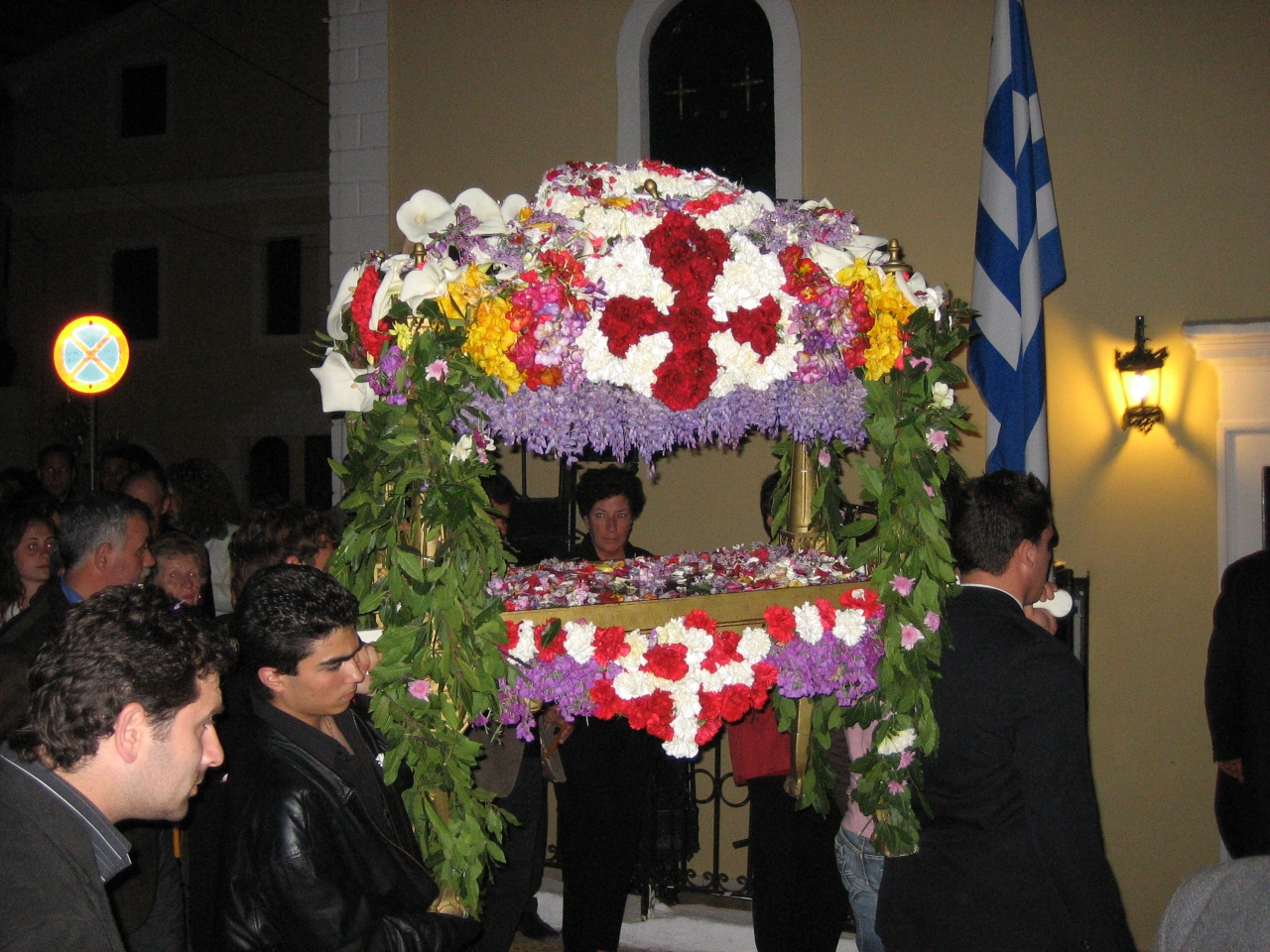
The Epitaphios is placed on a decorated bier, and carried in procession.

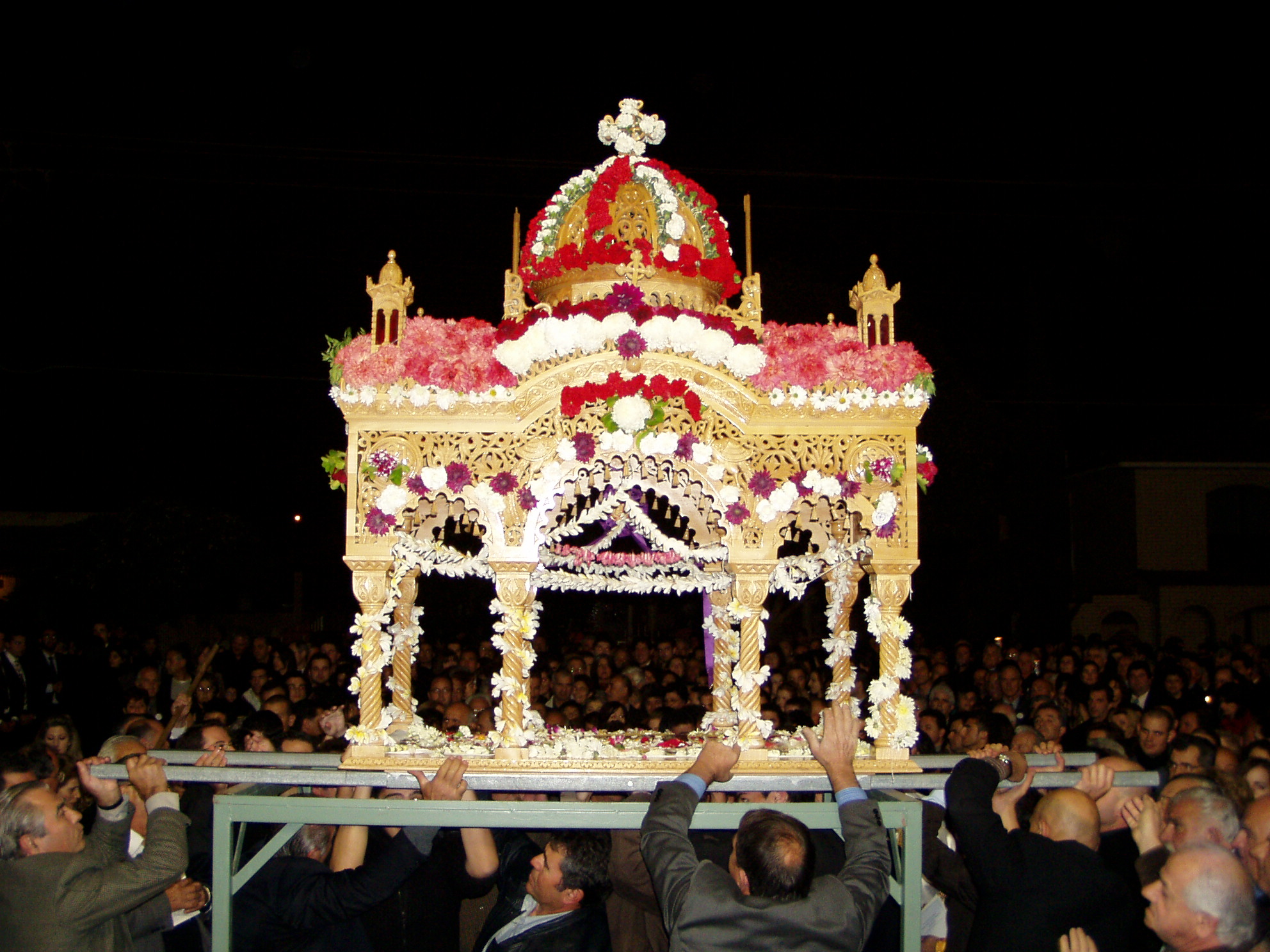
The Epitaphios mounted upon return of procession.

The Burial of Christ. During Matins, the Epitafios Thrinos or Lamentations (Greek: Ἐπιτάφιος Θρῆνος, Epitaphios Thrēnos, "Epitaphic Lamentation"; or Ἐγκώμια, Enkōmia, "praises") are sung before the Epitaphios as at the tomb of Christ, while all hold lighted candles. The verses of these Lamentations are interspersed between the verses of Psalm 118 (the chanting of this psalm forms a major part of the Orthodox funeral service as well as being a usual part of Saturday Matins).

Near the end of Matins, during the Great Doxology, a solemn procession with the Epitaphios is held, with bells ringing the funeral toll, commemorating the burial procession of Christ. In Slavic churches, the Epitaphios alone is carried in procession with candles and incense. It may be carried by hand or raised up on poles like a canopy. Many Greek churches, however, will carry the entire bier, with its carved canopy attached. In societies where Byzantine Christianity is traditional, the processions may take extremely long routes through the streets, with processions from different parishes joining in a central location. Where this is not possible, the procession goes three times around the outside of the church building. The procession is accompanied by the singing of the Trisagion, typically in a melodic form used at funerals. Those unable to attend the church service will often come out to balconies and sidewalks where the procession passes, holding lit candles and sometimes hand-held censers. In many Greek villages, the Epitaphios is also paraded in the cemetery, among the graves, as a covenant of eternal life to those who have died.

In many towns where more than one parishes exist, the processions often converge to a single spot, e.g. a square, where they temporarily stop and a common Triságion is sung before they resume their routes. This is notably done on the island of Hydra, where the Epitaphios from the Kamíni parish is brought into the sea until the bier bearers are waist-high in the water, as a special blessing for those who have perished at sea. In larger towns the procession is led by a local marching band playing funeral marches; in some cities the Epitaphios is escorted by military detachments, their arms in the mourning (muzzle towards the ground) position.

At the end of the procession, the Epitaphios is brought back to the church. Sometimes, after the clergy carry the Epitaphios in, they will stop just inside the entrance to the church, and hold the Epitaphios above the door, so that all who enter the church will pass under it (symbolically entering into the grave with Christ) and then kiss the Gospel Book. In Greek churches, the Epitaphios is then brought directly to the sanctuary, where it remains on the Holy Table until Ascension Thursday. In Slavic churches, it is brought back to the catafalque in the middle of the church (and may be honoured further with more petals, rosewater and incense), where it remains until the Midnight Office at the Paschal Vigil on Great Saturday night. Where the Epitaphios remains in the centre of the church, the faithful will continue to venerate it throughout Great Saturday.

=== Liturgy on Holy Saturday ===
The Little Hours on Holy Saturday are read near the Epitaphios, rather than the kliros; and certain portions of the Divine Liturgy that would normally be performed at the ambo in front of the Holy Doors (Ektenias, reading the Gospel, the Great Entrance, etc.) are instead performed in front of the Epitaphios. Only the Communion of the Faithful and the dismissal take place at the ambo.

In some places, the entire Liturgy takes place around the Epitaphios, with it serving as the Holy Table (altar), and the clergy standing around it instead of behind the iconostasis.

=== Midnight Office of Pascha ===
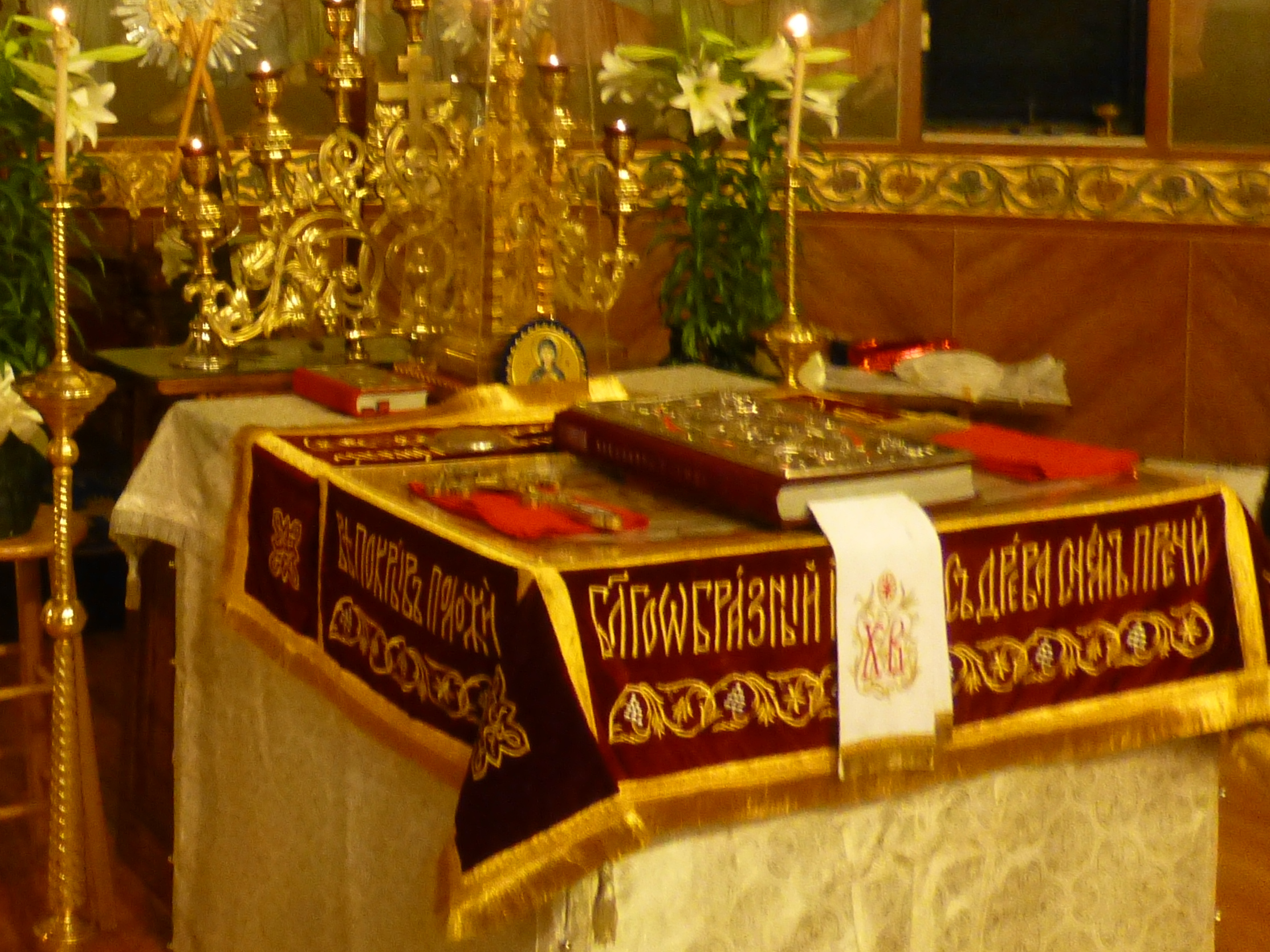
Epitaphios on the Holy Table on Pascha

During the Midnight Office, after the Usual Beginning and Psalm 50, the Canon of Great Saturday, repeated from the preceding Matins as a reflection upon the meaning of Christ's death and his Harrowing of Hell. During the last Ode of the Canon, at the words, "weep not for me, O Mother, for I shall arise...", the priest and deacon dramatically lift the Epitaphios (which represents the dead body of Christ) from the bier and carry it through the Holy Doors into the sanctuary, laying it upon the Holy Table (altar), so that its border hangs down in front of the Holy Table and is visible through the open Holy Doors. There it will remain throughout the Paschal season as a reminder of the burial cloth left in the empty tomb (John 20:5).

=== Paschal season ===
During Bright Week (Easter Week), the Holy Doors of the sanctuary remain open as a symbol of the empty tomb of Christ. The Epitaphios is clearly visible through the open doors, and thus symbolizes the winding sheet left in the tomb after the resurrection.

At the end of Bright Week, the Holy Doors are closed, but the Epitaphios remains on the Holy Table for 40 days, as a reminder of Jesus' physical appearances to his disciples from the time of his Resurrection until his Ascension into heaven.

== Epitaphios of the Theotokos ==
An Epitaphios of the Theotokos also exists. This too is a richly embroidered cloth icon, but depicting instead the body of the Theotokos lying in state. This is used on the feast of the Dormition of the Theotokos on 15 August, known in the West as the Assumption of Mary. The Epitaphios of the Theotokos is used with corresponding hymns of lamentation, placed on a bier, and carried in procession in the same way as the Epitaphios of Christ, although it is never placed on the Holy Table.

The Rite of the "Burial of the Theotokos" began in Jerusalem, and from there it was carried to Russia, where it was used in the Uspensky (Dormition) cathedral in Moscow. Its use has slowly spread among the Russian Orthodox, though it is not by any means a standard service in all parishes, or even most cathedrals or monasteries. In Jerusalem, the service is chanted during the All-Night Vigil of the Dormition. In some Russian churches and monasteries, it is served on the third day after Dormition.

== See also ==
- Eulogy
- Jesus is Laid in the Tomb (14th Station of the Cross)
- Santo Entierro, a sculpted version used in the Philippines
