= Fear a' Bhàta =

Scots Gaelic song

Fear a' Bhàta (translated The boatman) is a Scots Gaelic song from the late 18th century, written by an unknown author pining for her beloved, a fisherman at sea. The song captures the emotions that she endured.

== Lyrics ==
There are many versions of the lyrics and of the melody:

Gaelic verses

Séist:
Fhir a' bhàta, na hóro eile
Fhir a' bhàta, na hóro eile
Fhir a' bhàta, na hóro eile
Mo shoraidh slàn leat 's gach àit' an téid thu

'S tric mi sealltainn on chnoc as àirde
Dh'fheuch am faic mi fear a' bhàta
An tig thu 'n-diugh na 'n tig thu màireach
'S mar tig thu idir gur truagh a ta mi

Tha mo chridhe-sa briste brùite
'S tric na deòir a ruith o m' shùilean
An tig thu nochd na 'm bi mo dhùil riut
Na 'n dùin mi 'n doras le osna thùrsaich?

'S tric mi faighneachd de luchd nam bàta
Am fac' iad thu na 'm bheil thu sàbhailt
Ach 's ann a tha gach aon dhiubh 'g ràitinn
Gur gòrach mise ma thug mi gràdh dhut

Gheall mo leannan dhomh gùn dhen t-sìoda
Gheall e siud agus breacan rìomhach
Fàinn' òir anns am faicinn ìomhaigh
Ach 's eagal leam gun dèan e dìochuimhn'

Cha'n eil baile beag sam bi thu
Nach tamh thu greis ann a chuir do sgios diot
Bheir thu lamh air do leabhar riamhach
Ghabhail dhuanag, 's a bhuaireadh nianag

Ged a thuirt iad gun robh thu aotrom
Cha do lughdaich siud mo ghaol ort
Bidh tu m' aisling anns an oidhche
Is anns a' mhadainn bidh mi 'gad fhaighneachd

Thug mi gaol dhut 's chan fhaod mi àicheadh
Cha ghaol bliadhna 's cha ghaol ràithe
Ach gaol a thòisich nuair bha mi 'm phàiste
'S nach searg a chaoidh gus an claoidh am bàs mi

Tha mo chàirdean gu tric ag innseadh
Gum feum mi d' aogas a leig' air dìochuimhn'
Ach tha 'n comhairle dhomh cho dìomhain
'S bi tilleadh mara 's i toirt lìonaidh

Tha mo chriosan air dol an airde
Cha'n ann o fhidhlair, na o chlarsair
Ach o stiuireadair a bhata
'S mur tig thu dhathigh, s' truagh mar tha mi

Bidh mi tuille tùrsach deurach
Mar eala bhàn 's i an dèidh a reubadh
Guileag bàis aic' air lochan feurach
Is càch gu lèir an dèidh a trèigeadh

Translation:

English translation

Chorus (after each verse):
O Boatman, no one else
O Boatman, no one else
O Boatman, no one else
My farewell to you wherever you go

I often look from the highest hill
That I might see my boatman
Will you come tonight, or will you come tomorrow
Oh sorry will I be if you do not come at all

My heart is broken, bruised
Often tears are running down from my eyes
Will you come tonight, or will I wait up for you
Or close the door with a sad sigh?

I often ask of the boatmen
If they have seen you, if you are safe
But they all tell me
That I was foolish if I gave you love.

My darling promised me a gown of silk
That and a fine tartan
A golden ring in which I'd see a likeness
But I fear that he shall forget.

[Translation unknown]

Although they said you were flighty
That did not lessen my love for you
You are in my dreams at night
And in the morning I ask for you.

I gave you love and cannot deny
It's not love that lasts a year or a season
But a love that began when I was a child
And that will not wither until death do take me.

My friends say often
That I must forget your image
But their counsel is as unfathomable to me
As is the returning tide.

[Translation unknown]

I am all too sad and tearful
Like a white swan that has been torn
Sounding her death-call on a small grassy loch
Having been forsaken by all.

== Analysis ==
According to legend, the poem was written by Sìne NicFhionnlaigh (Jean Finlayson) of Tong who was courting a young fisherman from Uig, Dòmhnall MacRath. In some versions of the legend they were married not long after she composed the song. Contemporary scholars and 19th century sources describe the author of the poem as unknown.

== See also ==
- Ailein duinn
- Chì mi na mòrbheanna
- Gaelic music
