= Smile In Your Sleep =

Song
- Language: Scottish English or Scots
- Published: 1968
- Genre: Lament
- Composer: John Cameron ("Chi Mi Na Mòrbheanna")
- Lyricist: Jim McLean

"Smile In Your Sleep", sometimes known as "Hush, Hush, Time To Be Sleeping" (Scots: "Hush, Hush, Time Tae Be Sleepin") is a Scottish folk song and lament written by Jim McLean and set to the tune of the Gaelic air, "Chi Mi Na Mòrbheanna" (literally "I will see the great mountains", or "Mist Covered Mountains"). It follows the experiences of crofters during the Highland Clearances through eviction and emigration.

== Notes ==
See "Chi Mi Na Mòrbheanna" for the source references.
