= Epitaphios Thrinos =

Traditional orthodox lament for the commemoration of the death of Christ on Holy Saturday

- Epitaphios Thrinos; Εγκώμια επιταφίου (Greek)
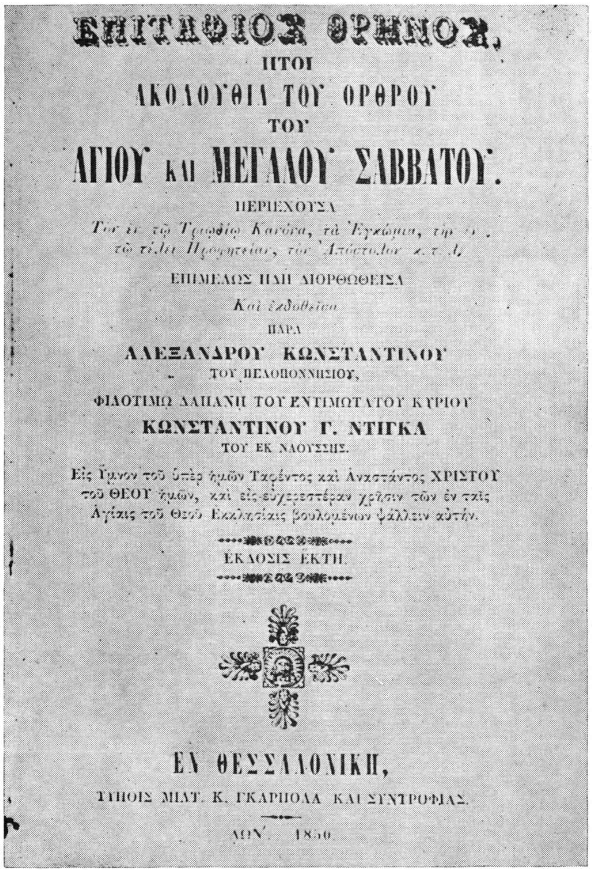

Lament of Christ
- Released: 1522
- No. of Hymns: up to 185
- Psalms: 118

The Epitaphios Thrinos (Greek: Επιτάφιος Θρήνος, lit. 'Threnody on the Tomb') also known as Encomia Epitafiou (Εγκώμια Επιταφίου) is a Christian liturgical hymn sung on Holy Friday in the Orthodox churches. Full of strong emotional feelings, it is one of "the most beloved hymns of the Orthodox".

Known in English as the "Threnody at the Tomb", its other Greek name, Encomia Epitafiou (Greek: Εγκώμια επιταφίου), "Praises of the Tomb", could assimilate it with a form of encomium or praise rather than lament. The pagan encomium is the source of the Christian panegyric, and the Epitaphios Thrinos was therefore a form of panegyric for Christ.

== History ==
The early manuscripts for the liturgy of Holy Saturday do not seem to mention the Encomia. The first reference to encomia is found in manuscripts of the thirteenth century in connection with Psalm 118, known as the Amomos. Their number, however was undefined, and it appears that the collection grew gradually to its present form, resulting in many variations among the collections.

The repertoire of the Encomia lamentations first appeared as such in the 1522 edition of the service book of the Orthodox Church Triodion, printed in Venice. Subsequent editions have relied heavily on this source.

According to the Lenten Triodion as well as the 1906 edition of the Patriarchal Text, there are 185 verses in the Epitaphios Thrinos divided into three stasis or sections. However, the Triodion and the Patriarchal text do not concur as to the placement of the Epitaphios: in all the editions of the Triodion the Encomia appear before the Canon in the order of the Orthros of Great Saturday while the same Encomia appear after the Canon for the Patriarchal Text of Great Week.

== Liturgy ==
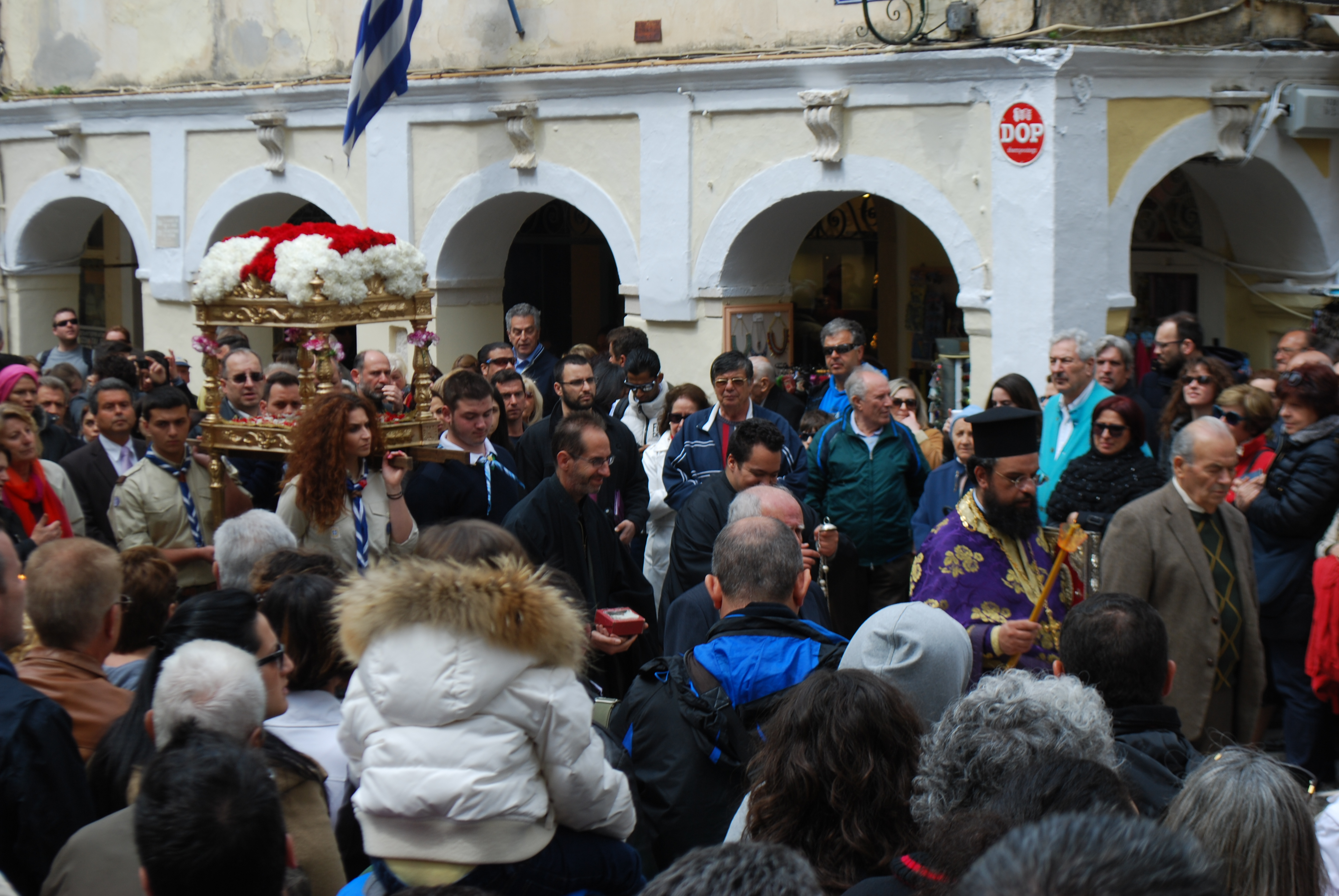
Procession of the Epitaphion after chanting the Epitaphios Thrinos in Corfu in 2014.

The verses of these Lamentations are interspersed between the verses of Psalm 118 (the chanting of this psalm forms a major part of the Orthodox funeral service as well as being a usual part of Saturday Matins). The Lamentations are divided into three sections called stáses, which commemorate the Passion, Death and Entombment of Christ. Each statis is commonly known by its first phrase; in Greek these are:

- First stasis: Ἡ ζωὴ ἐν τάφῳ, He zoe en taphoi, "Life in (the) tomb" or "Life in (the) grave".
- Second stasis: Ἄξιον ἐστί, Axion esti, "Worthy, it is" or "It is Truly Meet".
- Third stasis: Αἱ γενεαὶ πᾶσαι, Hai geneai pasai, "All the generations" or "Every generation".

At the beginning of each stasis, the priest or deacon performs a censing of the epitaphios. In the Greek tradition, at the third and final stasis, the priest will sprinkle rosewater on the epitaphios and the congregation, symbolising the anointing of Christ's body with spices.

All three of stasis end with the same eulogy they begin while the officiating priest or high priest incenses the epitaph on all four sides.

== Lyrics ==
While some musical settings have famous authors or interpreters, the author of the Encomia remains unknown. Famous hymnographers of the Holy Week hymns, including Andrew of Crete, Cosmas of Maiuma, John of Damascus, Theophanes the Confessor, Theodore the Studite, Joseph the Hymnographer, and Mark the Monk could be associated with the Encomia but no strong evidence for any of the above has been given to confirm their authorship. The lyrics of the Encomia would be particularly long to quote in full, but the emotions they convey can be seen from this short abstract of the third stasis on the entombment of Christ:

Greek original	English translation
Ω γλυκύ μου έαρ, γλυκύτατόν μου Τέκνον, πού έδυ σου το κάλλος; Υιέ Θεού παντάναξ, Θεέ μου πλαστουργέ μου, πώς πάθος κατεδέξω; Έρραναν τον τάφον αι Μυροφόροι μύρα, λίαν πρωί ελθούσαι. Ω Τριάς Θεέ μου, Πατήρ Υιός και Πνεύμα, ελέησον τον κόσμον. Ιδείν την του Υιού σου, Ανάστασιν, Παρθένε, αξίωσον τους δούλους σου.	O my sweet spring, my sweetest Son, where is thy beauty? Son of God almighty, my God my Creator, how can I accept passion? Myrrh-bearers flowed over the grave, early in the morning you came. O Triune God of mine, Father, Son and Spirit, have mercy on the world. See that your Son, Once Risen, O Virgin, may make his servants worthy.

These lyrics served as models for the creation of similar ones for the Dormition of the Virgin, for Saint Nicholas and others.

== Performance ==
In addition to the cantors of Byzantine music, the eulogies have been performed and recorded by various contemporary Greek and international artists, such as Maria Farantouri, Glykeria, Haris Alexiou, Petros Gaitanos, Fairuz and others.

== Bibliography ==
- Alexiou, Margaret (2002-04-03). The Ritual Lament in Greek Tradition. Rowman & Littlefield Publishers. ISBN 978-1-4616-4548-1.

== Related articles ==
- Gorzkie żale, Polish lament of Jesus Christ
- Ngắm Mùa Chay, Vietnamese lament of Jesus Christ
