= Bier =

Stand or frame to move bodies or coffins

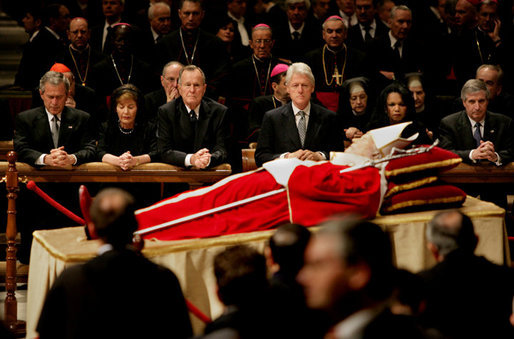
Pope John Paul II lying in state on his funeral bier at St. Peter's Basilica in Rome

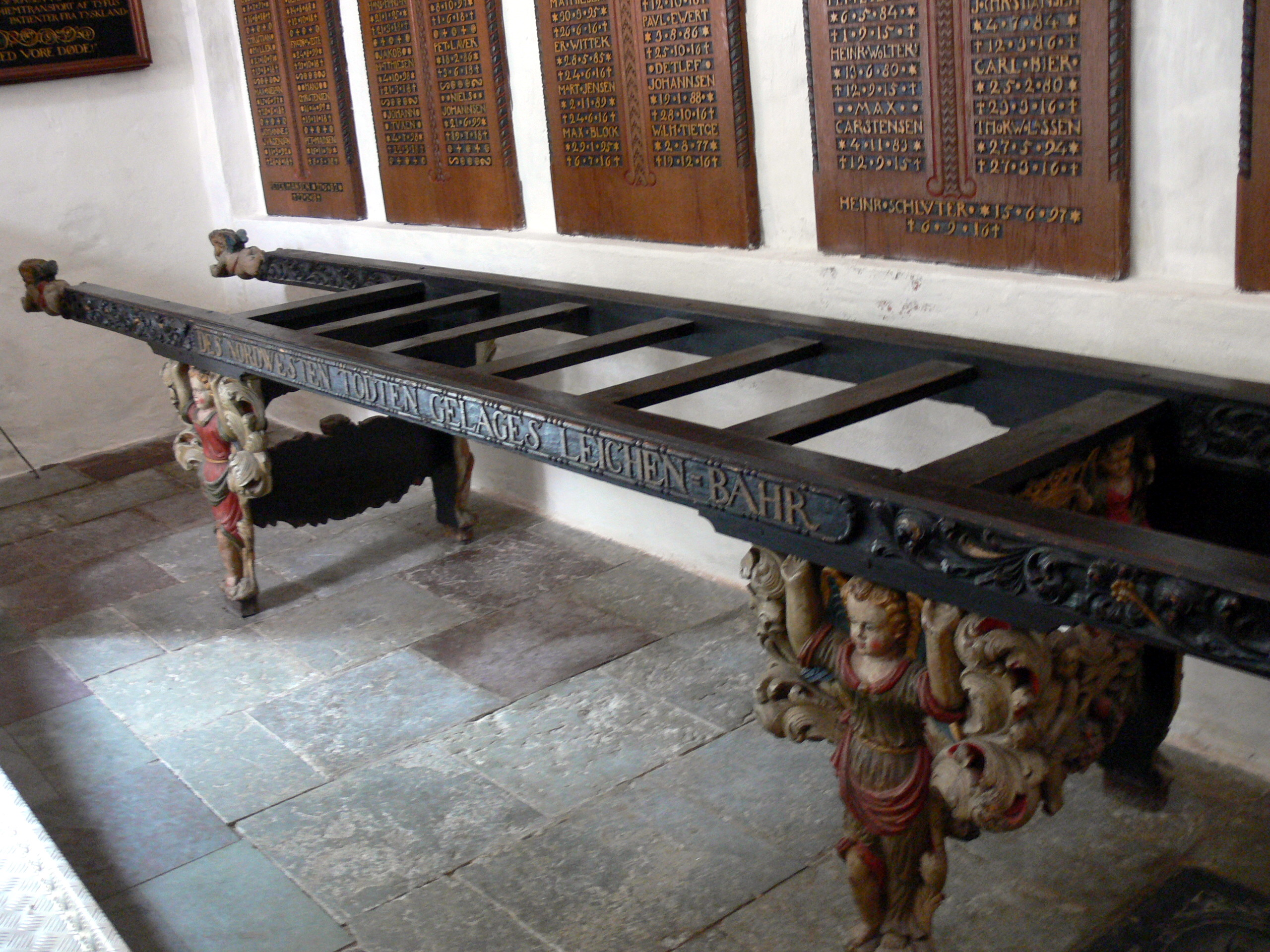
A bier from Tønder, Denmark

A bier is a stand on which a corpse, coffin, or casket containing a corpse is placed to lie in state or to be carried to its final disposition.

In Christian burial, the bier is often placed in the centre of the nave with candles surrounding it, and remains in place during the funeral.

The bier is a flat frame, traditionally wooden but sometimes of other materials. In antiquity it was often a wooden board on which the dead were placed, covered with a shroud. In modern times, the corpse is rarely carried on the bier without being first placed in a coffin or casket, though the coffin or casket is sometimes kept open.

A bier is often draped with cloth to lend dignity to the funeral service. The modern funeral industry uses a collapsible aluminium bier on wheels, known as a "church truck" to move the coffin to and from the church or funeral home for services.

Biers are generally smaller than the coffin or casket they support for reasons of appearance. As a result, they are not particularly stable, and can tip over unless well-centered and undisturbed.

The Carmelite Priory at Mdina, Malta, has a colorful bier on display that was used to carry the monks or friars before they were buried without a coffin.

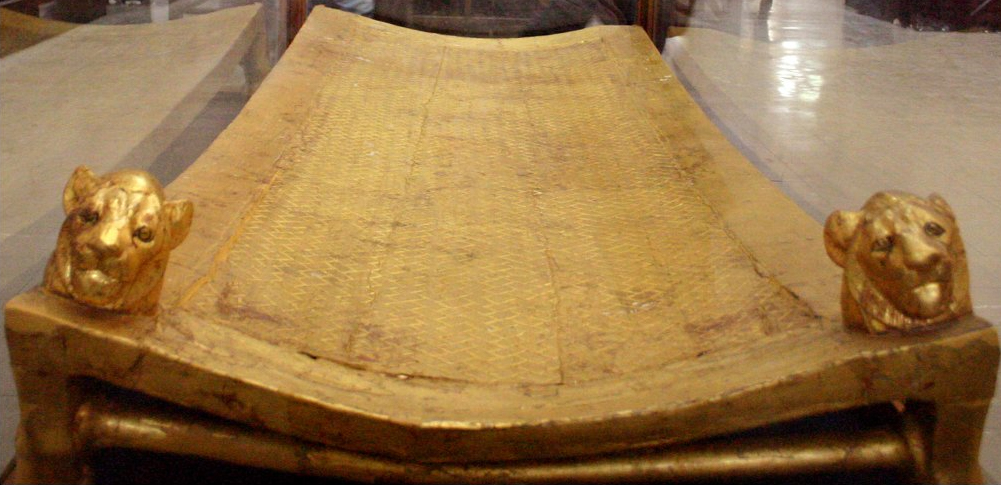
Gilded bier fashioned to resemble the goddess Sekhmet, the fierce lioness who was the protector of the kings in life and death, from the tomb of Tutankhamun, Cairo Museum

Ancient Egyptians depicted biers used in their embalming practices and to bear royal coffins in the tomb. They were fashioned to resemble the goddess Sekhmet, the fierce lioness who was the protector of the kings, displaying her head, feet, and often, her distinctive tail that in graphics is shown arching over the bier.

== See also ==
- Caisson
- Catafalque
- Epitaphios
- Funeral home
- Hearse
