= An Ciarraíoch Mallaithe =

Traditional Irish song

An Ciarraíoch Mallaithe is a traditional Irish song. A slow air romantic ballad, it means "The Cursed Kerryman".
